= Ramon Airbase =

Israeli Air Force base near Mitzpe Ramon

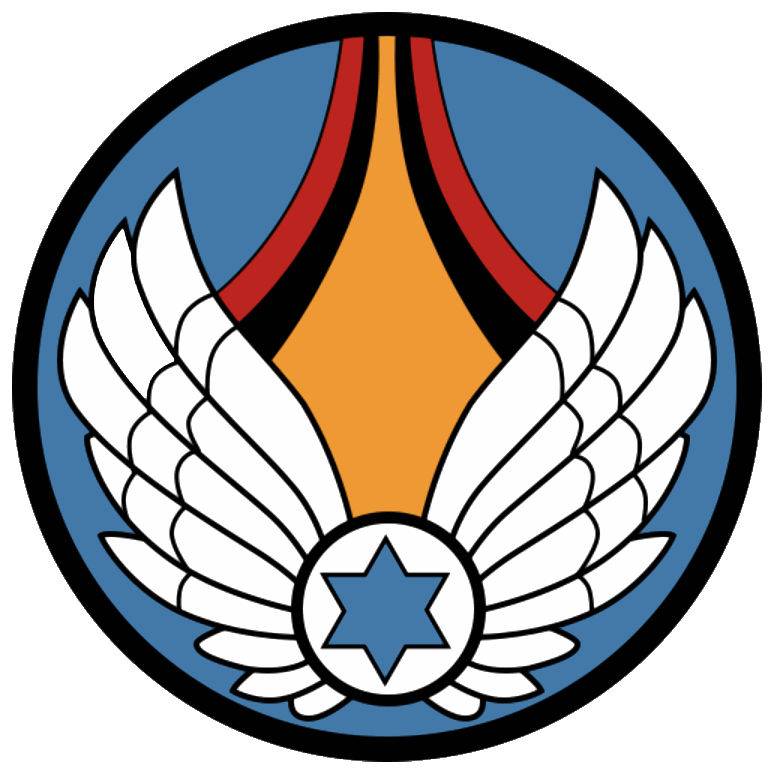
Ramon Israeli Air Force Base Air Wing 25
- בסיס חיל-האוויר רמון
- Mitzpe Ramon, Southern District in Israel
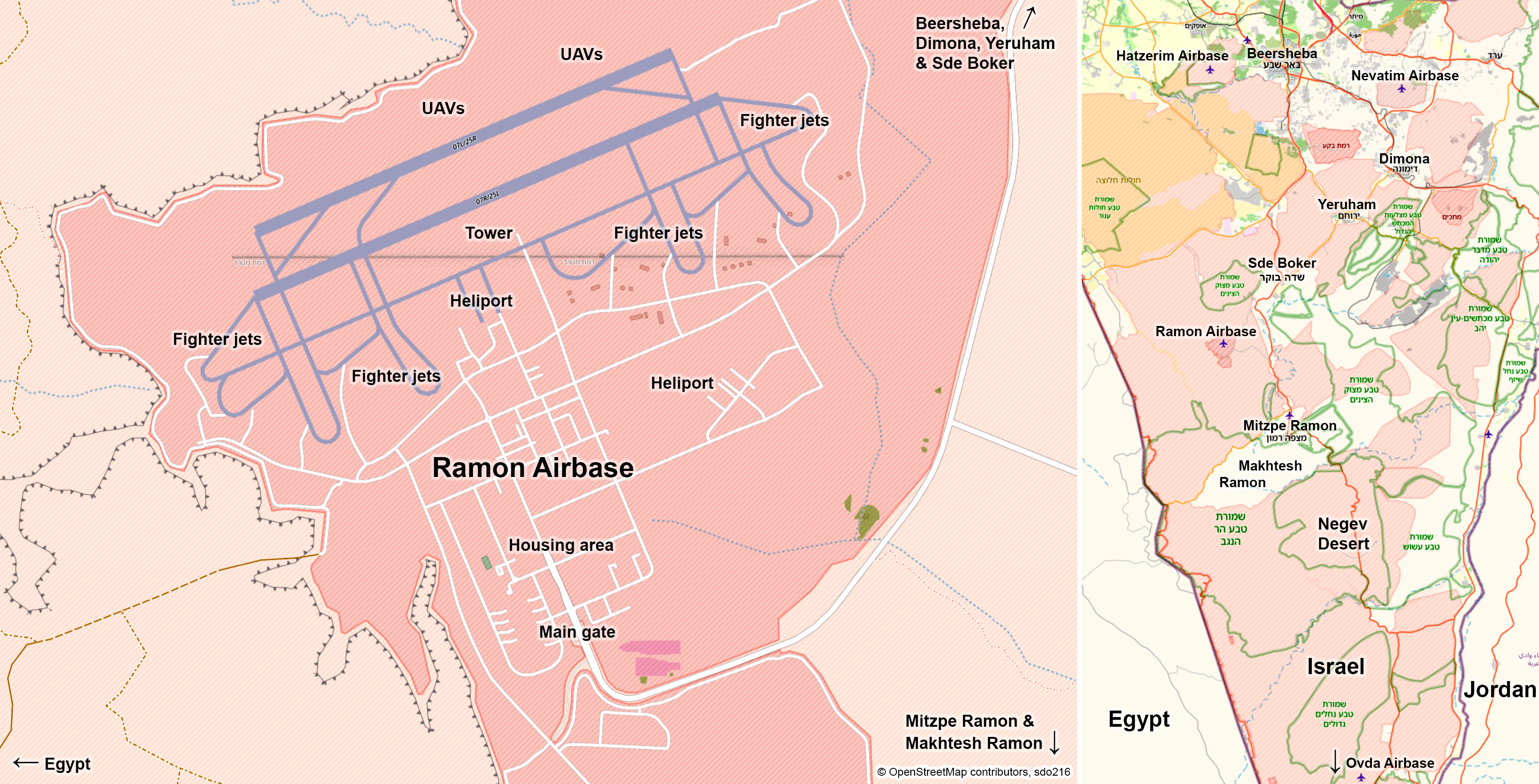

Site information
- Type: Airbase
- Owner: Israel Defense Forces
- Operator: Israeli Air Force

Location
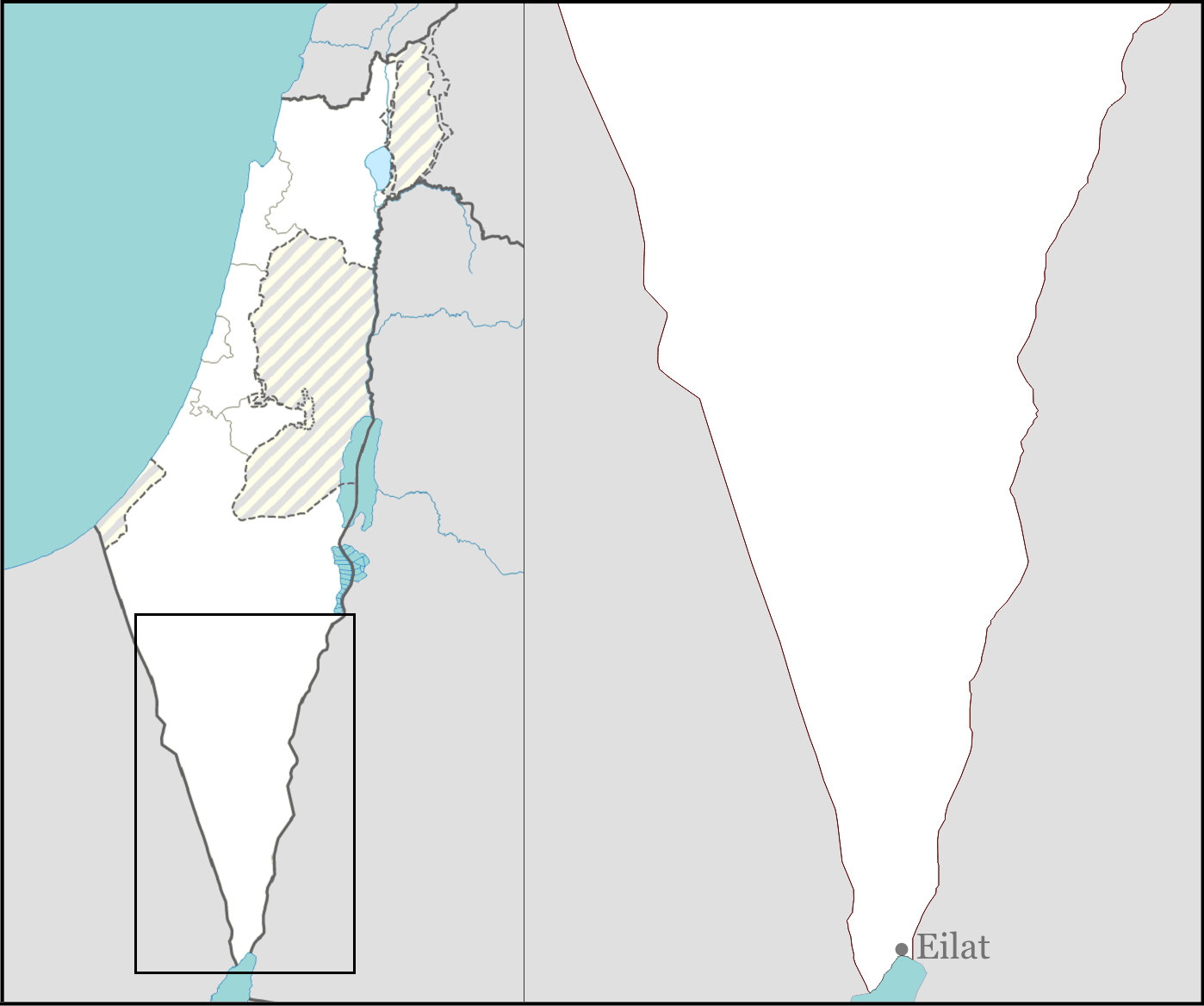
- Shown within Israel Ramon Airbase (Israel)
- Coordinates: 30°46′29″N 034°40′04″E

Site history
- Built: 1979-82
- Built by: US companies
- In use: 1982 - present

Airfield information
- Identifiers: ICAO: LLRM
- Elevation: 648 metres (2,126 ft) AMSL
Runways
Direction	Length and surface
07R/25L	3,010 metres (9,875 ft) Asphalt
07L/25R	2,700 metres (8,858 ft) Asphalt

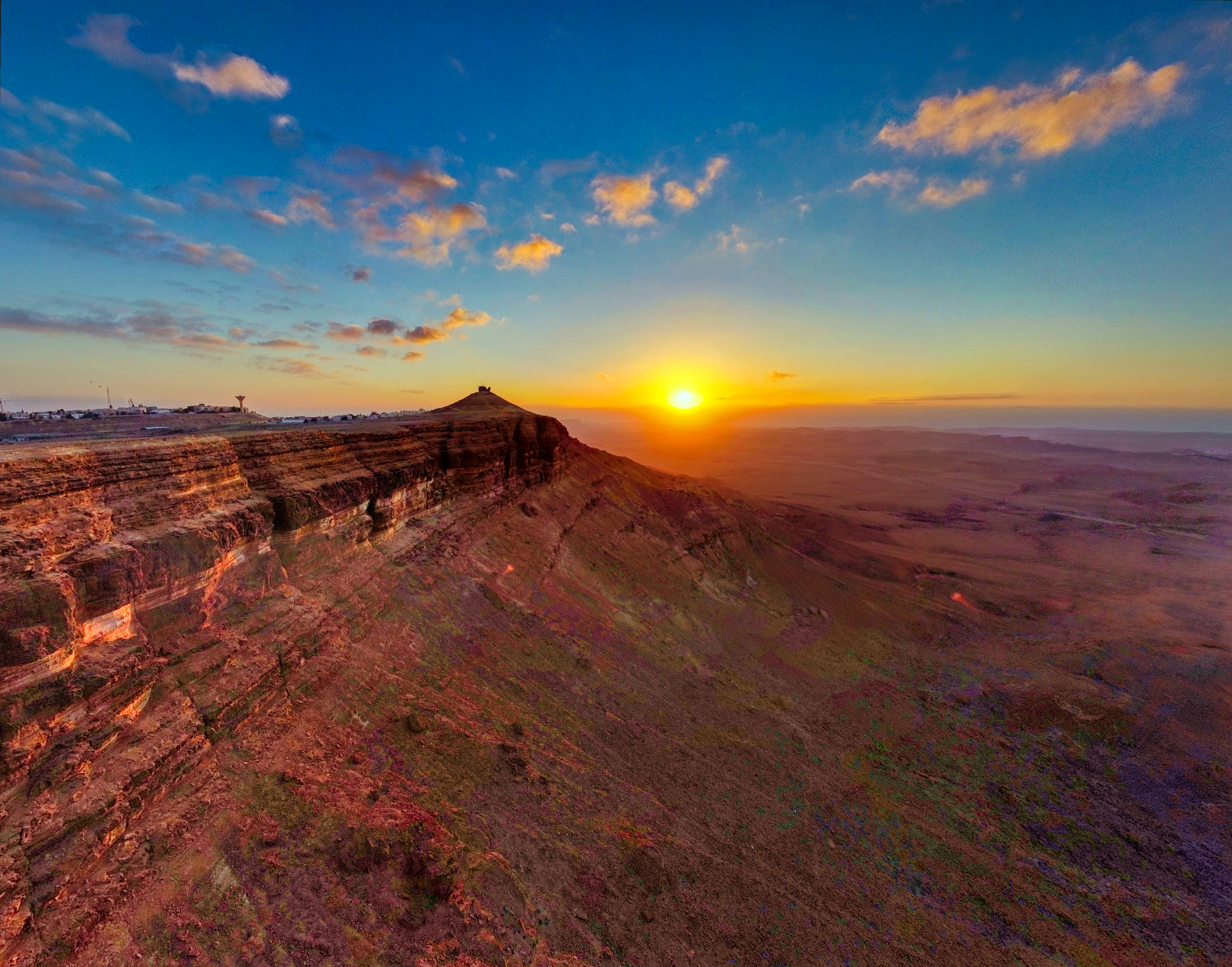
Village Mitzpe Ramon (left) and the huge "erosion crater" Makhtesh Ramon south of the airbase

Ramon Airbase (Hebrew: בסיס חיל-האוויר רמון (ICAO: LLRM), Basis Hayil-HaAvir Ramon, lit. Ramon Air Force Base) is an Israeli Air Force (IAF) base on the highland of the Negev desert, 50 km south of Beersheba, 20 km northwest of the town Mitzpe Ramon and 17 km away from the Egyptian border to the west. The base and the town got their names from the huge "erosion crater" Makhtesh Ramon south of it. The base is also titled the Negev Airbase or Kanaf 25 (Hebrew: כנף 25, lit. Wing 25), it was formerly known as Matred after a mostly dry stream on it. It is home to several squadrons of fighter jets and attack helicopters, and has two runways measuring 2,700 and 3,010 meters in length.

== History ==
=== Camp David Accords ===
The Ramon Airbase was built between 1979 and 1982, together with Nevatim and Ovda Airbase, mainly by US companies in southern Israel – as a replacement for the four Israeli bases on the Sinai Peninsula in Egypt that were abandoned after the Camp David Accords in September 1978 (see the map below also).

Abandoned Israeli Air Force (IAF) bases on the Sinai Peninsula:

- Eitam Airbase (today: El Gora Airport)
- Etzion Airbase (today: Taba International Airport)
- Ophira Airbase (today: Sharm El Sheikh International Airport)
- Rephidim Airbase (today: Bardawil International Airport at El Hassana)
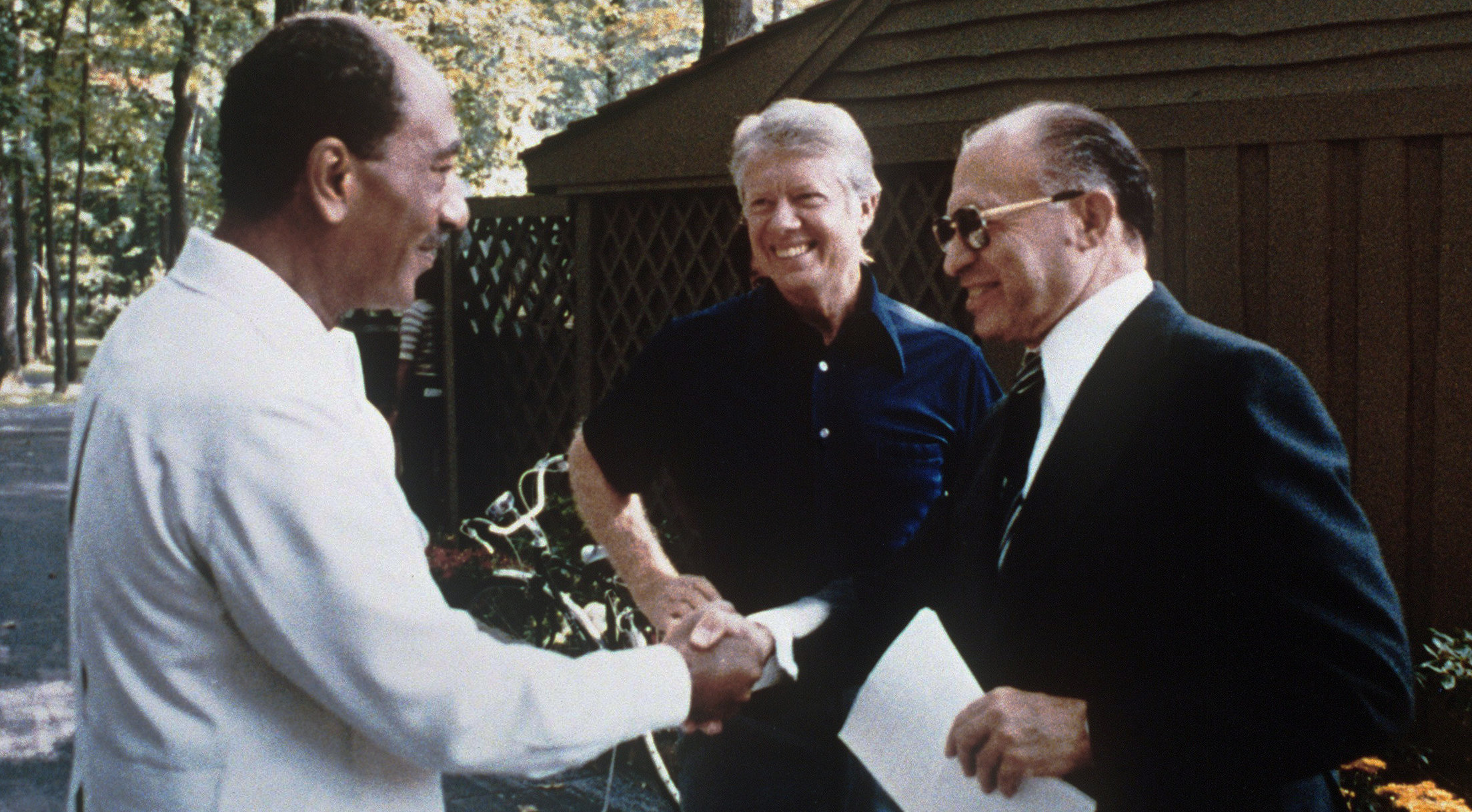
The then presidents Anwar Sadat, Jimmy Carter and Prime Minister Menachem Begin (left to right) at Camp David (USA) in September 1978

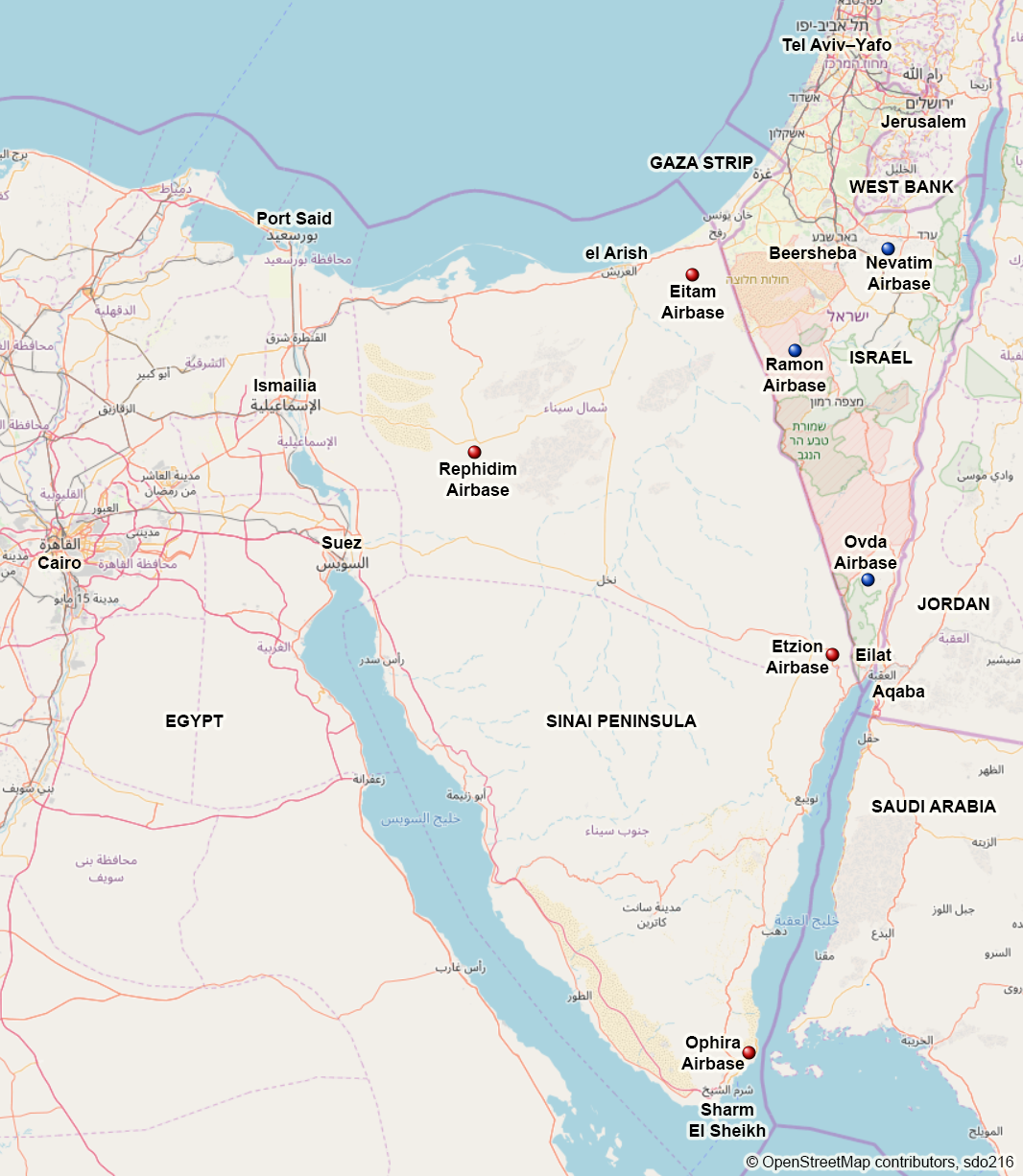
Abandoned Israeli Air Force (IAF) bases on the Sinai Peninsula (red) and newly established bases in southern Israel (blue)

The area for the airbase contained Iron Age sites and a former army firing range, both of which required further investigation before construction began, because of archaeological artifacts and unexploded bombs. The Ramon and Ovda airbases are very similar in their structure and construction.

=== Fighter jets ===
Even before its completion in 1982, Ramon took over some of the aircraft stationed at the former four Sinai bases, on the one hand A-4H/N Skyhawk Ayit light strike fighters and on the other hand F-16A/B Netz fighter jets:

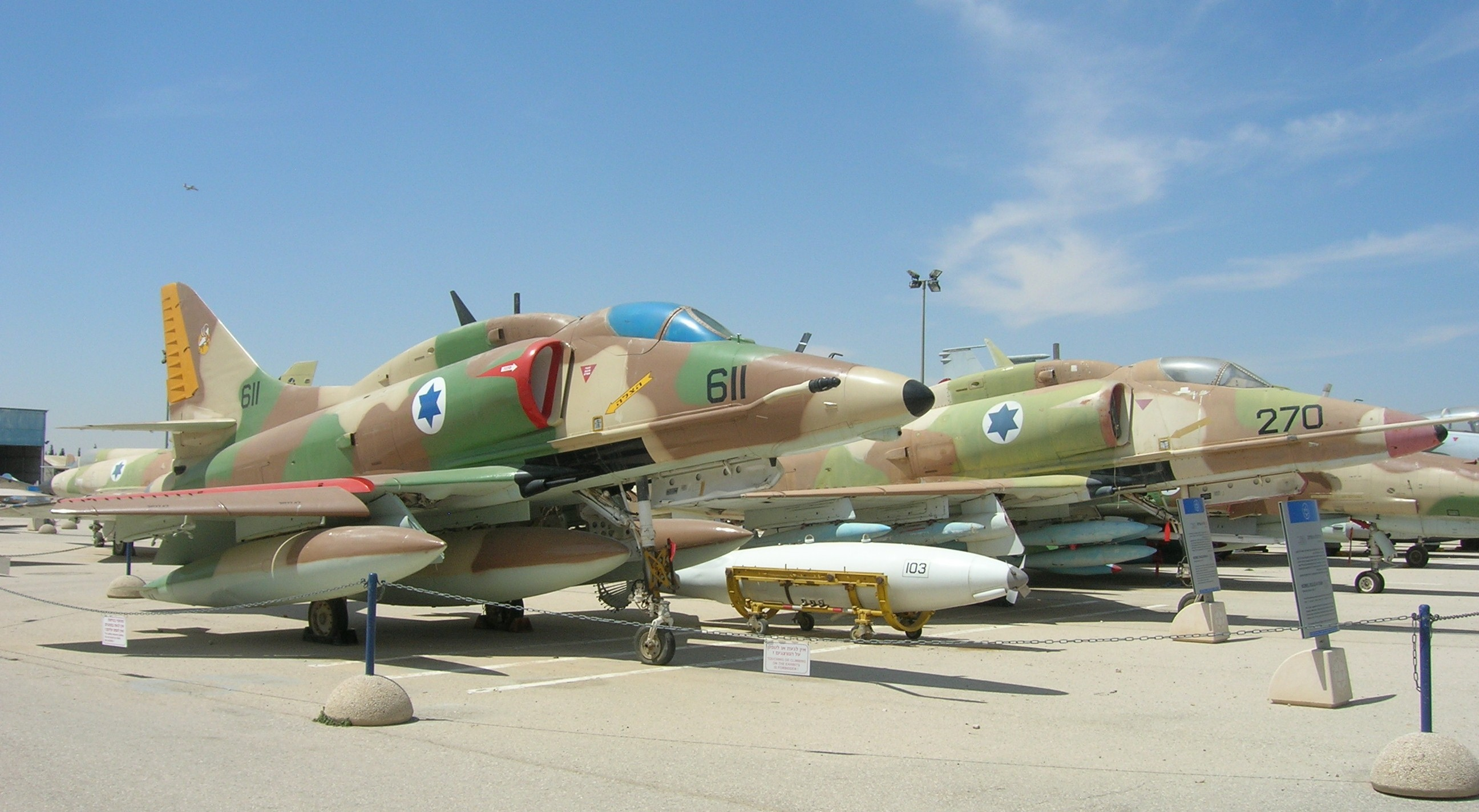
Two A-4 Skyhawk Ayit, A-4N and A-4H (left to right), 147 Squadron "Goring Ram", the A-4 was initially based on Ramon

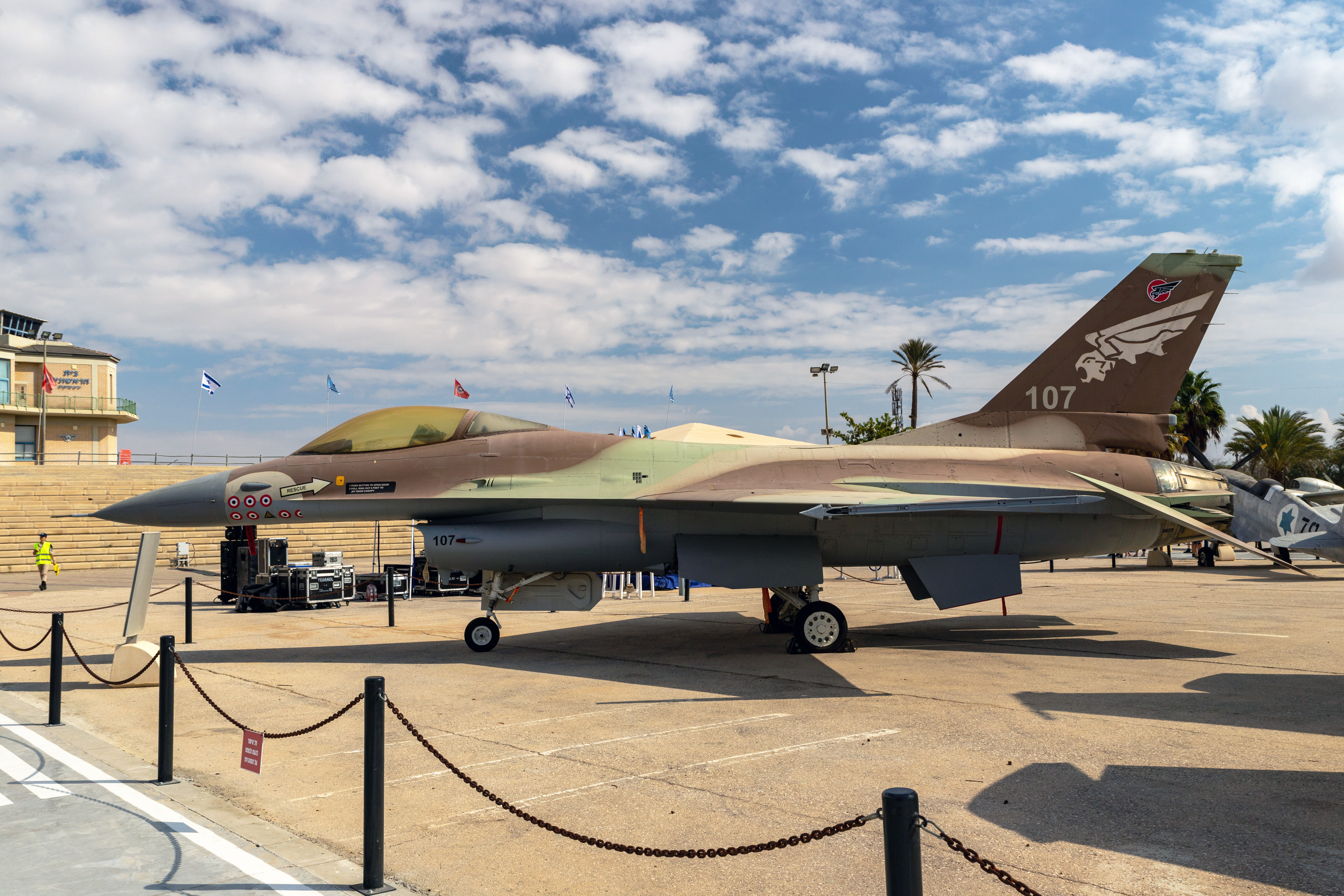
An F-16A Netz of 116 Squadron "Defenders Of The South", initially based on Ramon also

From the beginning, the airbase offered space for three squadrons of 25 fighter jets each, which are currently based there:

==== 119 Squadron "Bat" ====
The 119 Squadron "Bat" was established in 1956 at Ramat David Airbase and relocated to Tel Nof Airbase in 1957. It was primarily intended for night missions (hence the name "Bat") and initially flew the British-made Gloster Meteor NF.13 (Night Fighter) and the French-made Sud SO-4050 Vautour.

In the 1960s, the Dassault Mirage IIICJ Shahak followed, in the 1970s, the US-made F-4E Phantom II Kurnass, and from 1989 onwards, the Kurnass 2000, further developed in cooperation with Israeli companies. Another variant was the RF-4E Phantom II, introduced in 1971 (see photo in the gallery below) – a reconnaissance version of the F-4. The IAF gave it the name "Orev," which means "raven."

In 2004, all F-4Es were decommissioned and the 119 Squadron at Tel Nof Airbase was closed. In January 2005, the "Bat" squadron was reopened at Ramon Airbase and received the new F-16I Sufa jet, adapted to Israeli needs and based on the two-seat F-16D (Block 50/52 Plus) of the USAF.

Since its founding, the 119 Squadron "Bat" has been considered one of the elite squadrons of the Israeli Air Force, always equipped with the latest and most powerful fighter aircraft of its time, such as the F-16I Sufa.

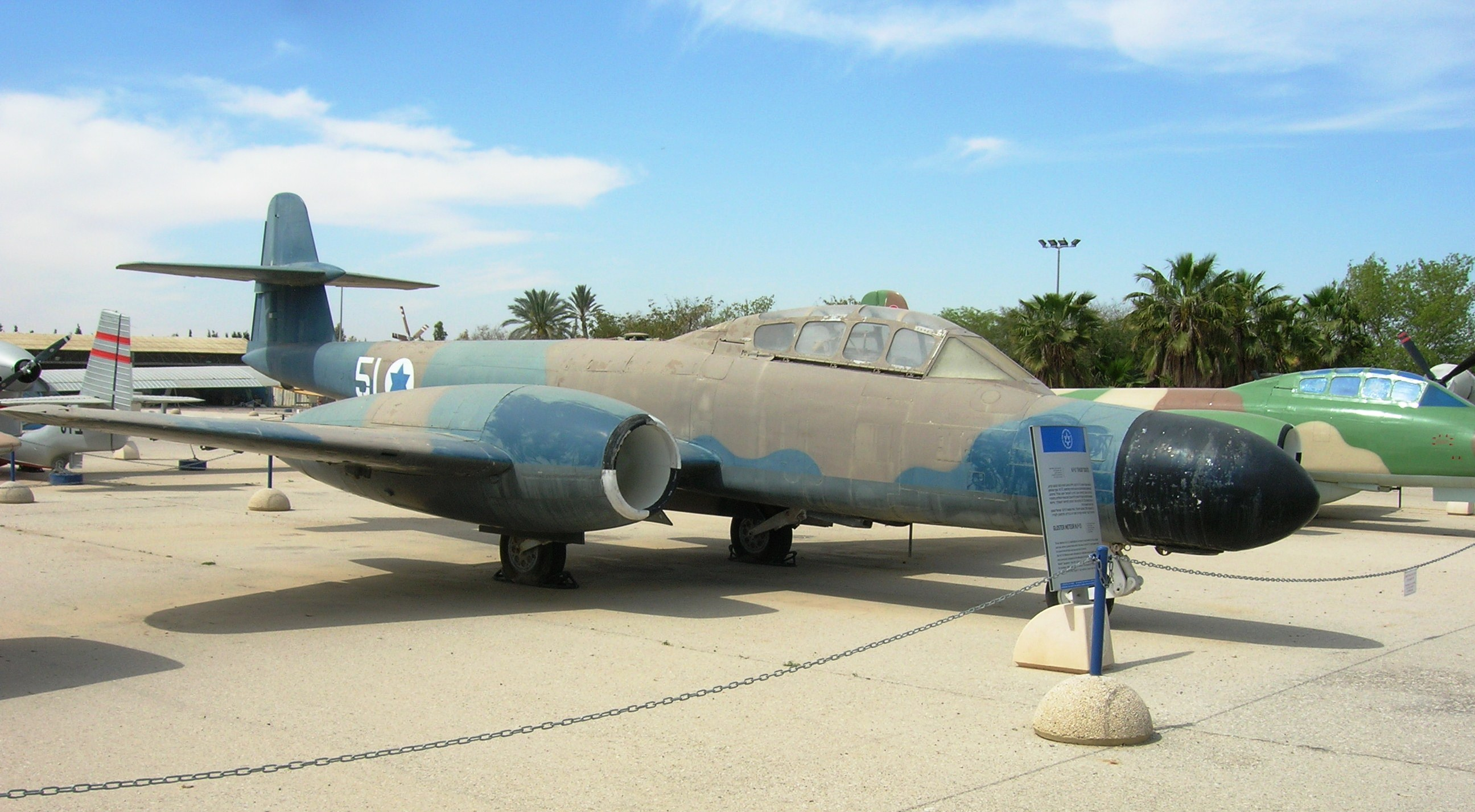
Two Gloster Meteor NF.13 – NF for night fighter – of 119 Squadron "Bat" from the 1950s at the IAF Museum near Hatzerim Airbase

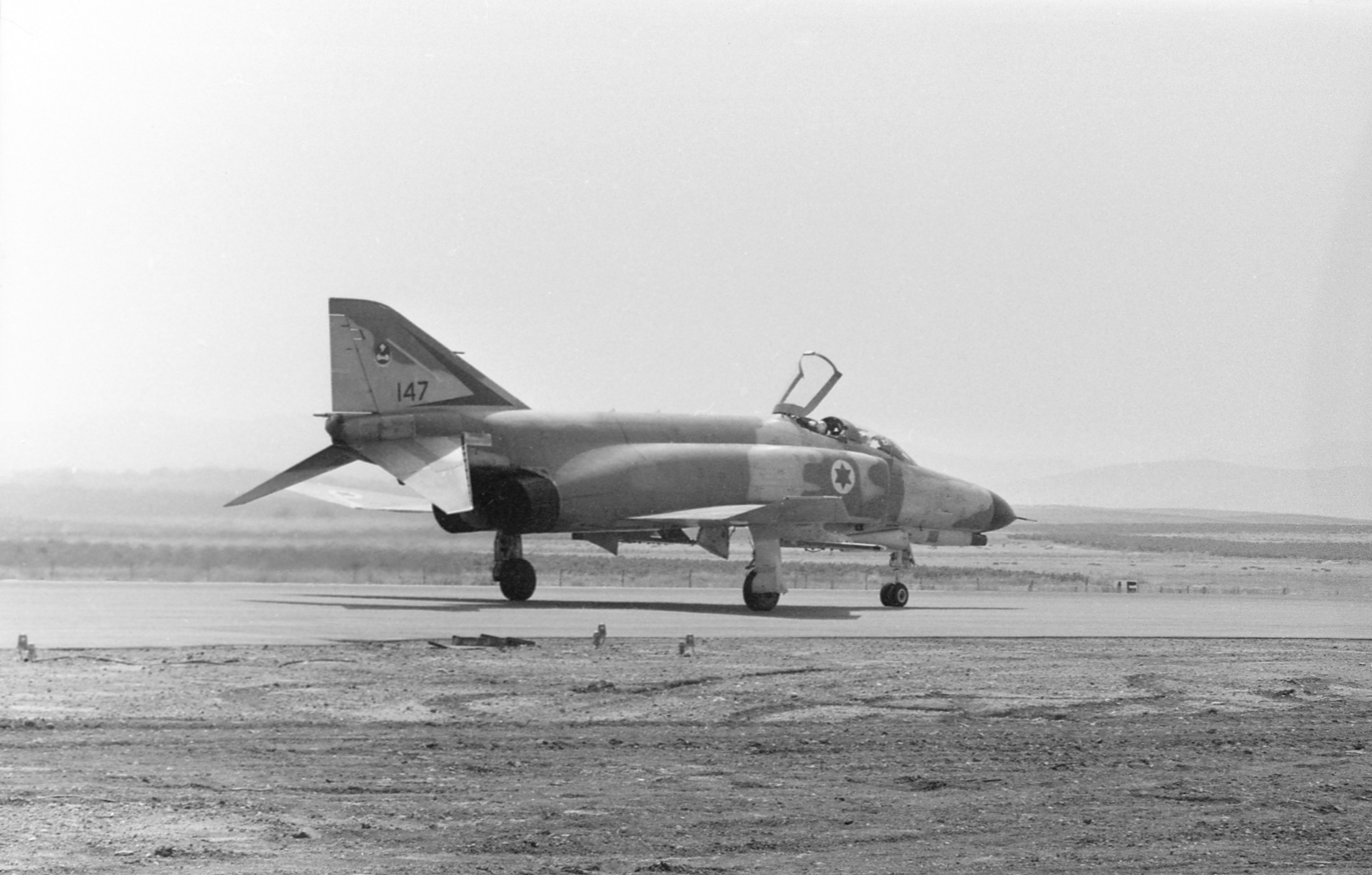
An RF-4E Phantom II Orev – R for reconnaissance – of 119 Squadron "Bat" just after the Yom Kippur War at Tel Nof Airbase in 1974

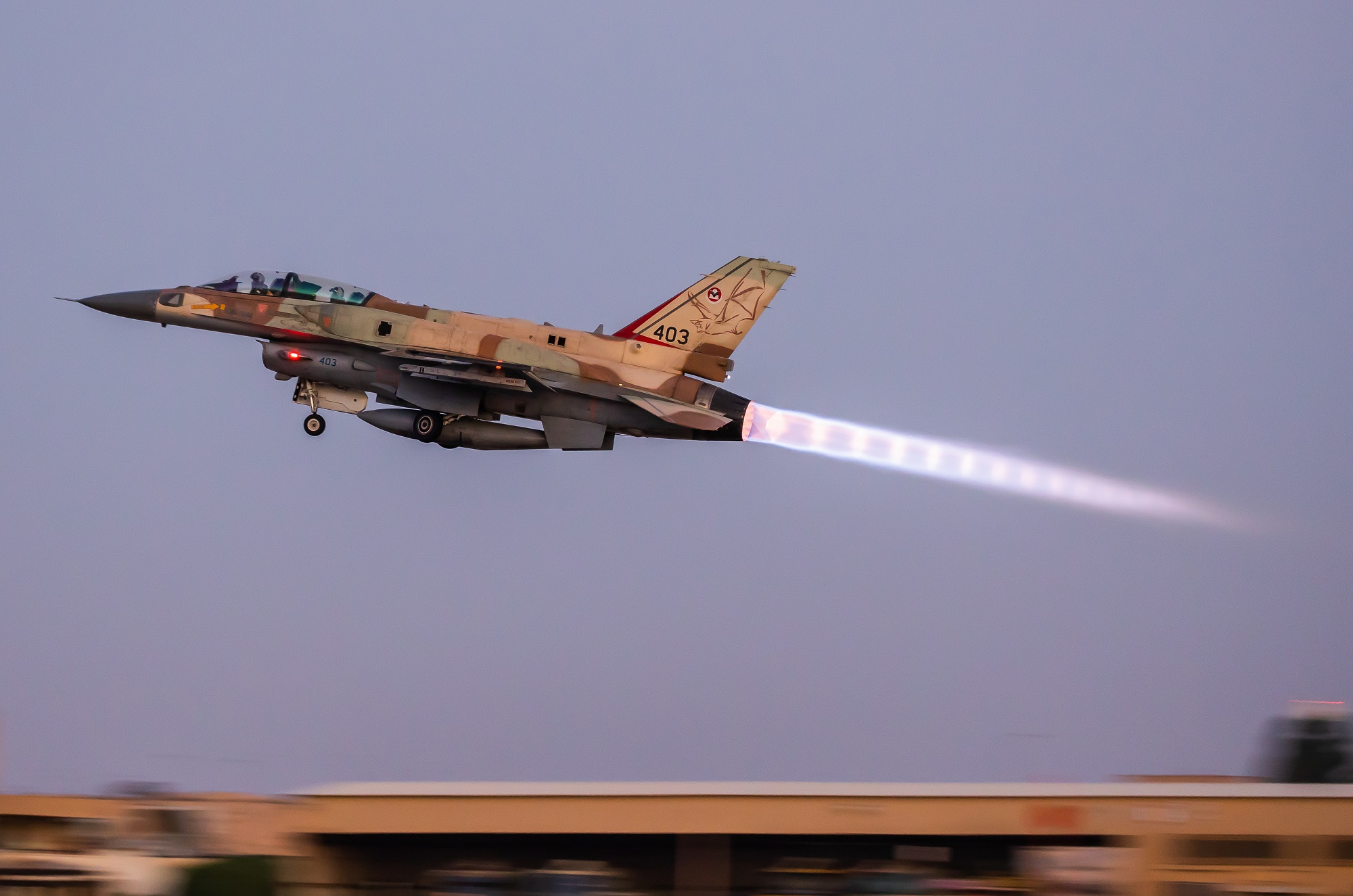
An F-16I Sufa of 119 Squadron "Bat" starts with full afterburner during an international exercise in November 2020

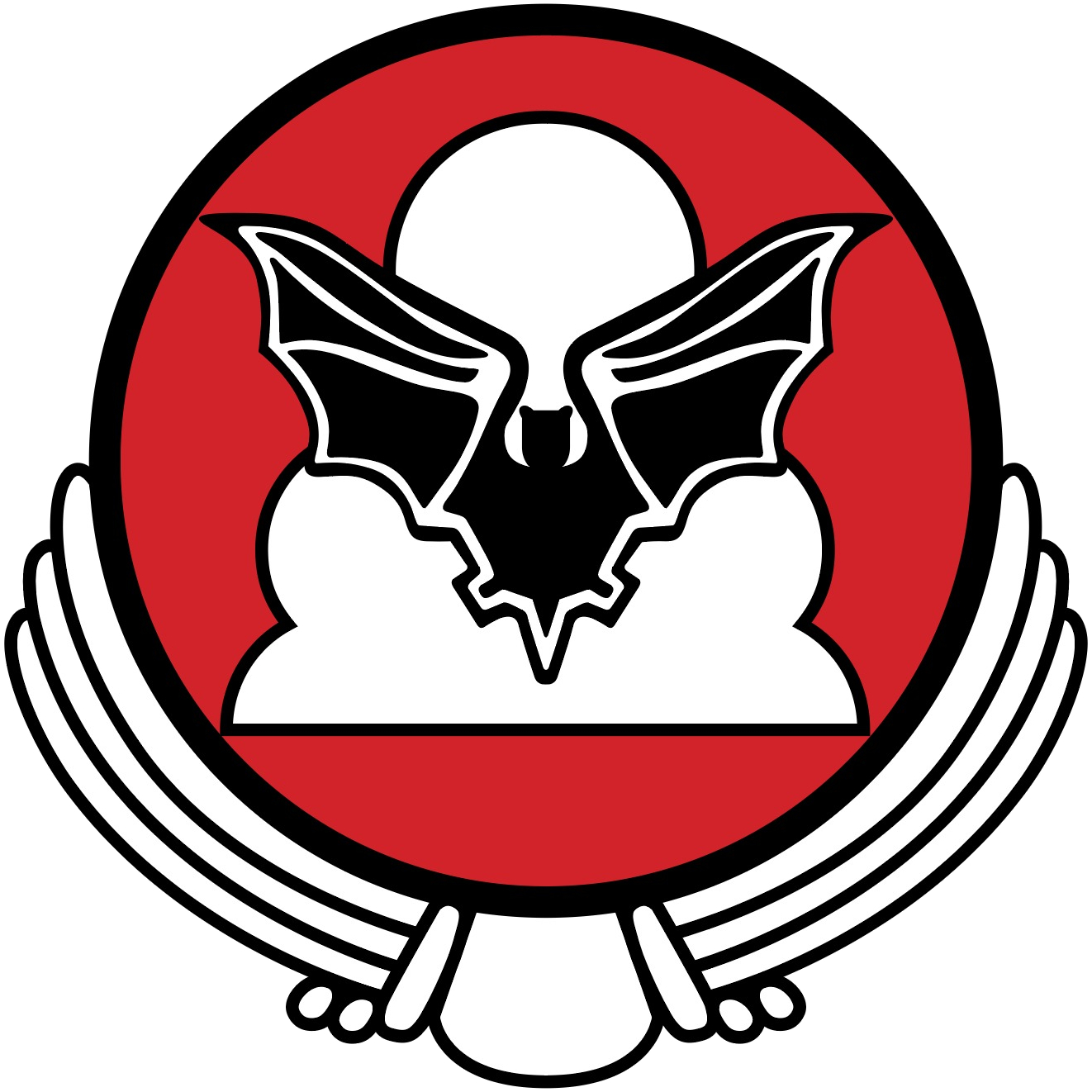
Current emblem of 119 Squadron "Bat"

==== 201 Squadron "The One" ====
The 201 Squadron "The One" was established in 1956 during the Suez Crisis at Lod Airbase (now Ben Gurion Airport) and initially flew the French-made Dassault Mystère IV A. In September 1969 – at the height of the War of Attrition with Egypt – it was the first Israeli squadron to receive the US-made F-4E Phantom II Kurnass at Hatzor Airbase. In 1988, the squadron moved to Tel Nof Airbase and received the improved Kurnass 2000 from 1989.

After all F-4Es were decommissioned in 2004, the squadron at Tel Nof was temporarily closed. In July 2008, "The One" squadron was reopened at Ramon Airbase and became the fourth and last of the Israeli Air Force to receive its F-16I Sufa jets. In addition to the three squadrons at Ramon, there is also the 107 Squadron "Knights Of The Orange Tail" at Hatzerim Airbase with these jets.

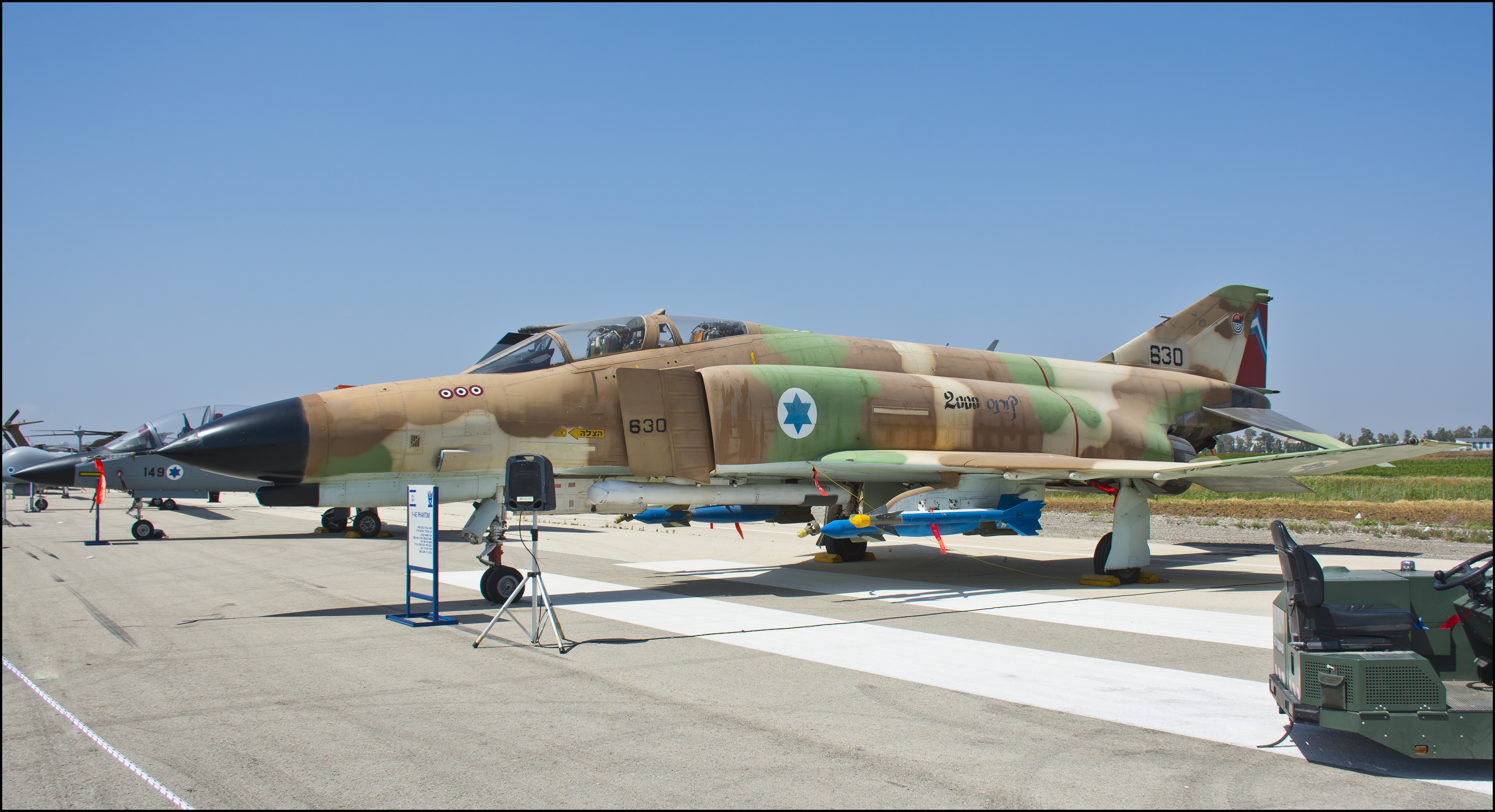
A decommissioned F-4E Phantom II Kurnass 2000 of 201 Squadron "The One" at an exhibition on Independence Day 2017 in Israel

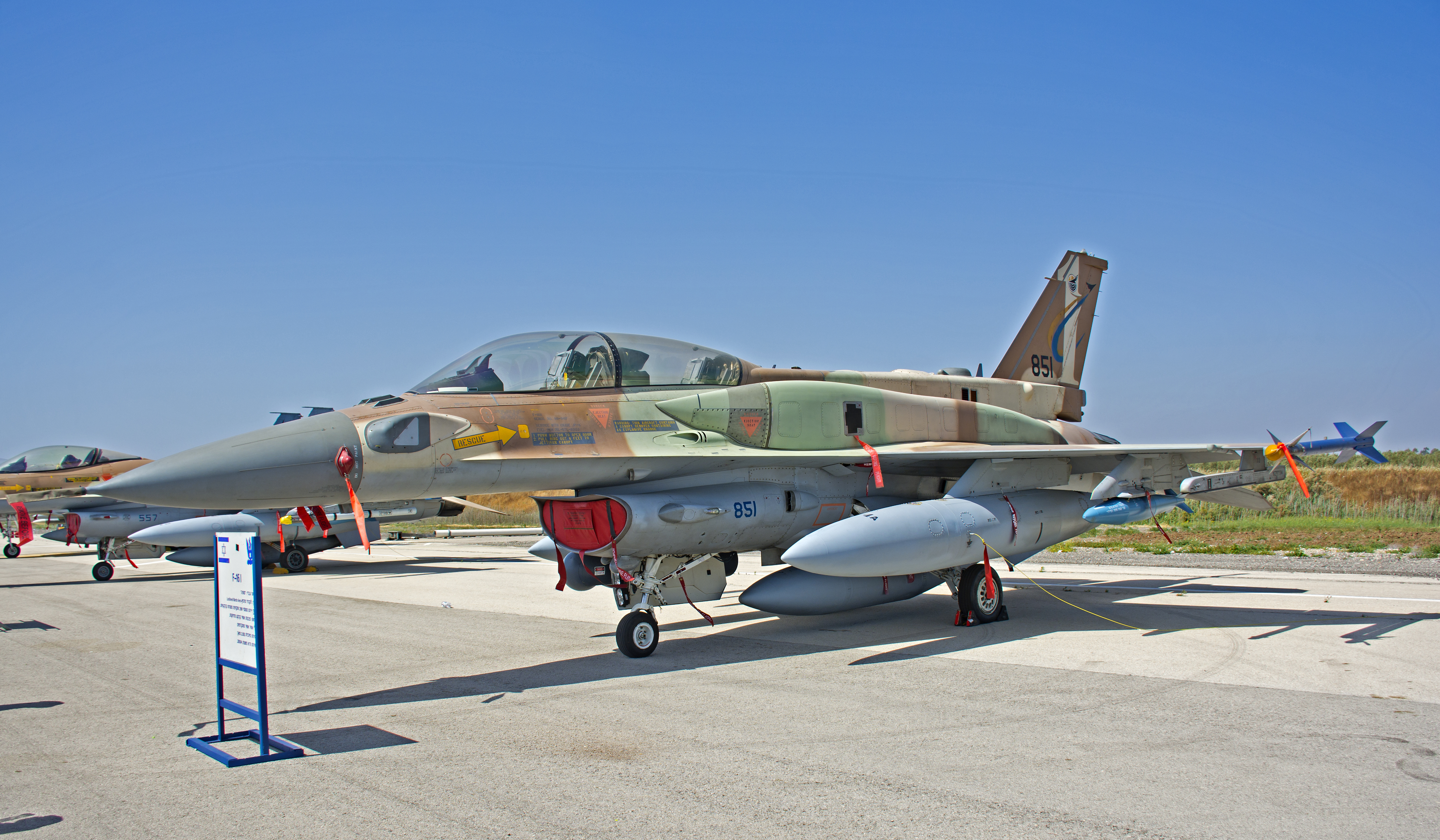
An F-16I Sufa of 201 Squadron "The One" during the same exhibition on Independence Day in spring 2017

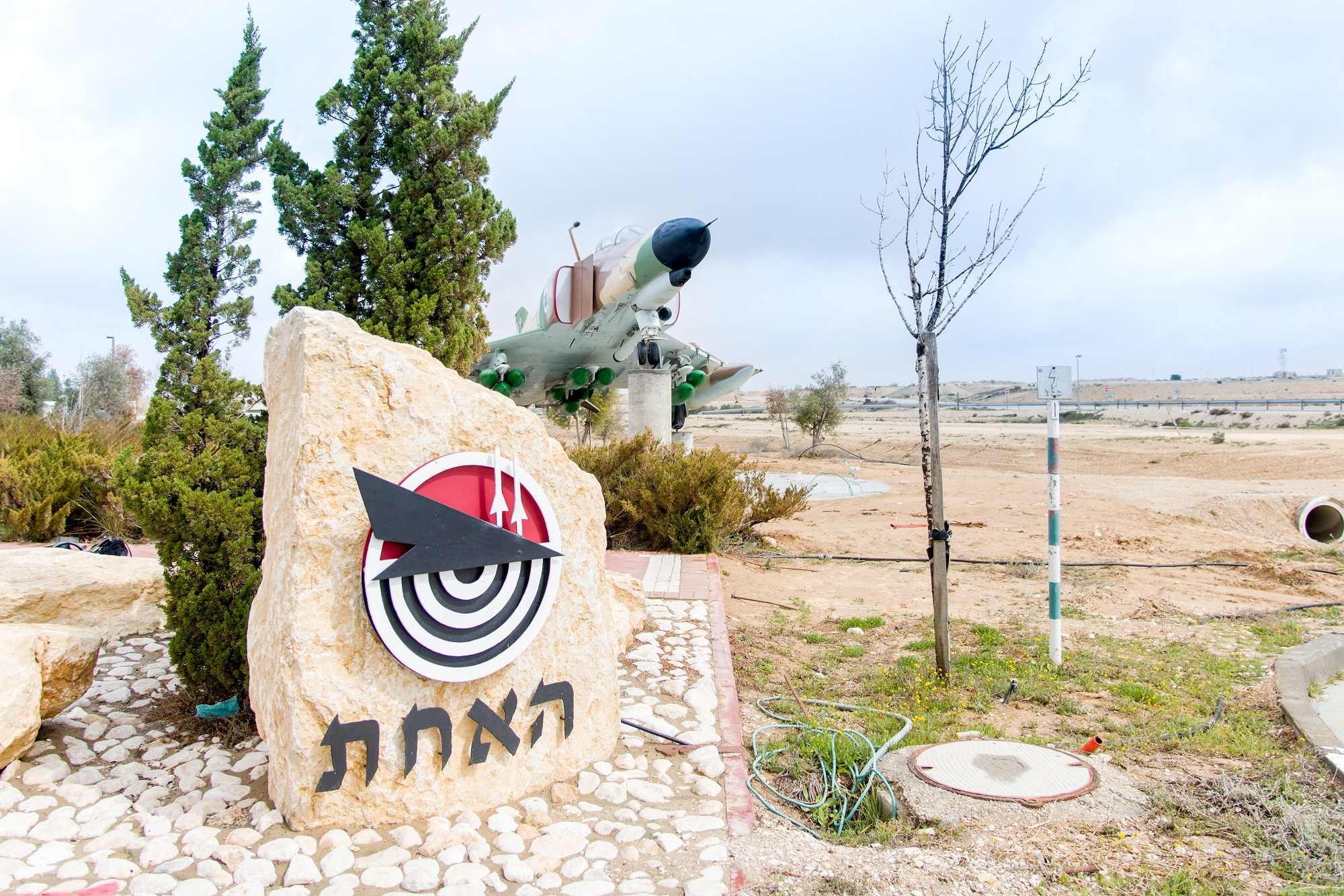
The 201 Squadron memorial with a restored F-4E Phantom II Kurnass at the gates of Ramon Airbase from February 2020

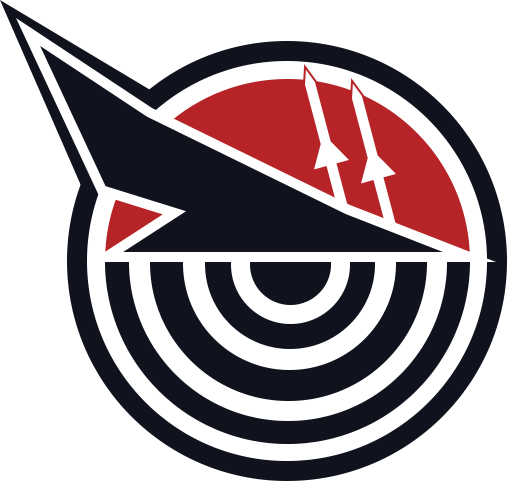
Current emblem of 201 Squadron "The One"

In April 2020, a memorial to the 201 Squadron "The One", featuring a restored F-4E Phantom II Kurnass, was opened outside the gates of the airbase. This specifically jet had flown for the squadron during the Yom Kippur War and spent many decades in the storeroom of the IAF Museum near Hatzerim Airbase. After a lengthy renovation process, the Kurnass was finally transported here from Hatzerim.

==== 253 Squadron "Negev" ====
The 253 Squadron "Negev" was established in 1976 at Hatzor Airbase and subsequently relocated to Eitam Airbase in northern Sinai, then under Israeli control. At this time, it flew the Israeli-built IAI Nesher and, from 1980, the Dassault Mirage IIICJ Shahak, which were taken over from other squadrons. In 1981, it moved to the newly built Ramon Airbase and soon received F-16A/B Netz jets.

In 2003, the squadron at Ramon was temporarily disbanded and its remaining F-16A/B jets were transferred to the 116 Squadron "Defenders of the South" at Nevatim Airbase. In February 2004, it became the first of four squadrons of the Israeli Air Force to receive the new F-16I Sufa, adapted to Israeli needs. Each squadron received 25 of these jets.

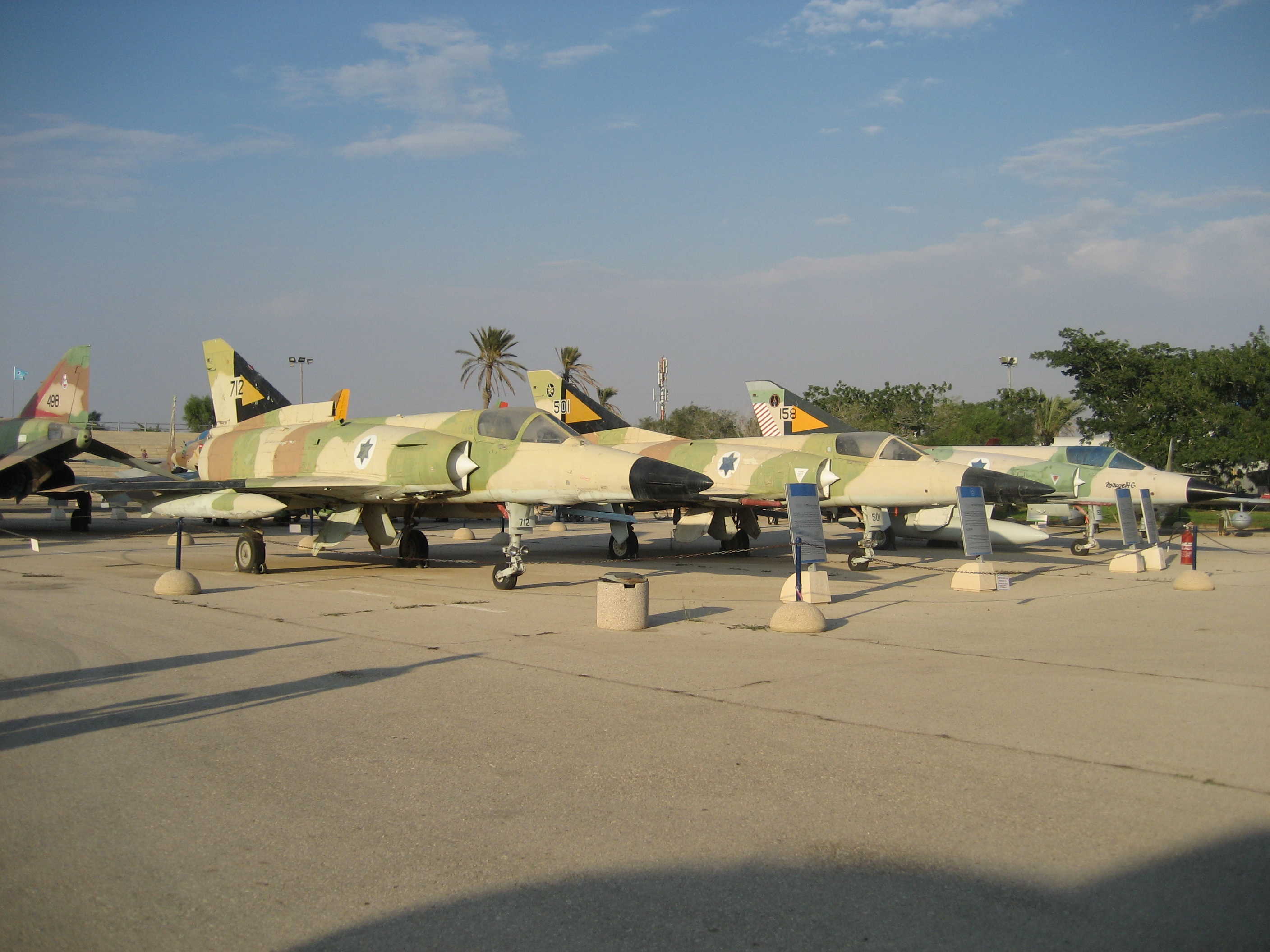
From left: IAI Kfir, IAI Nesher and Mirage IIICJ Shahak, the latter two were also in the 253 Squadron "Negev", IAF Museum at Hatzerim

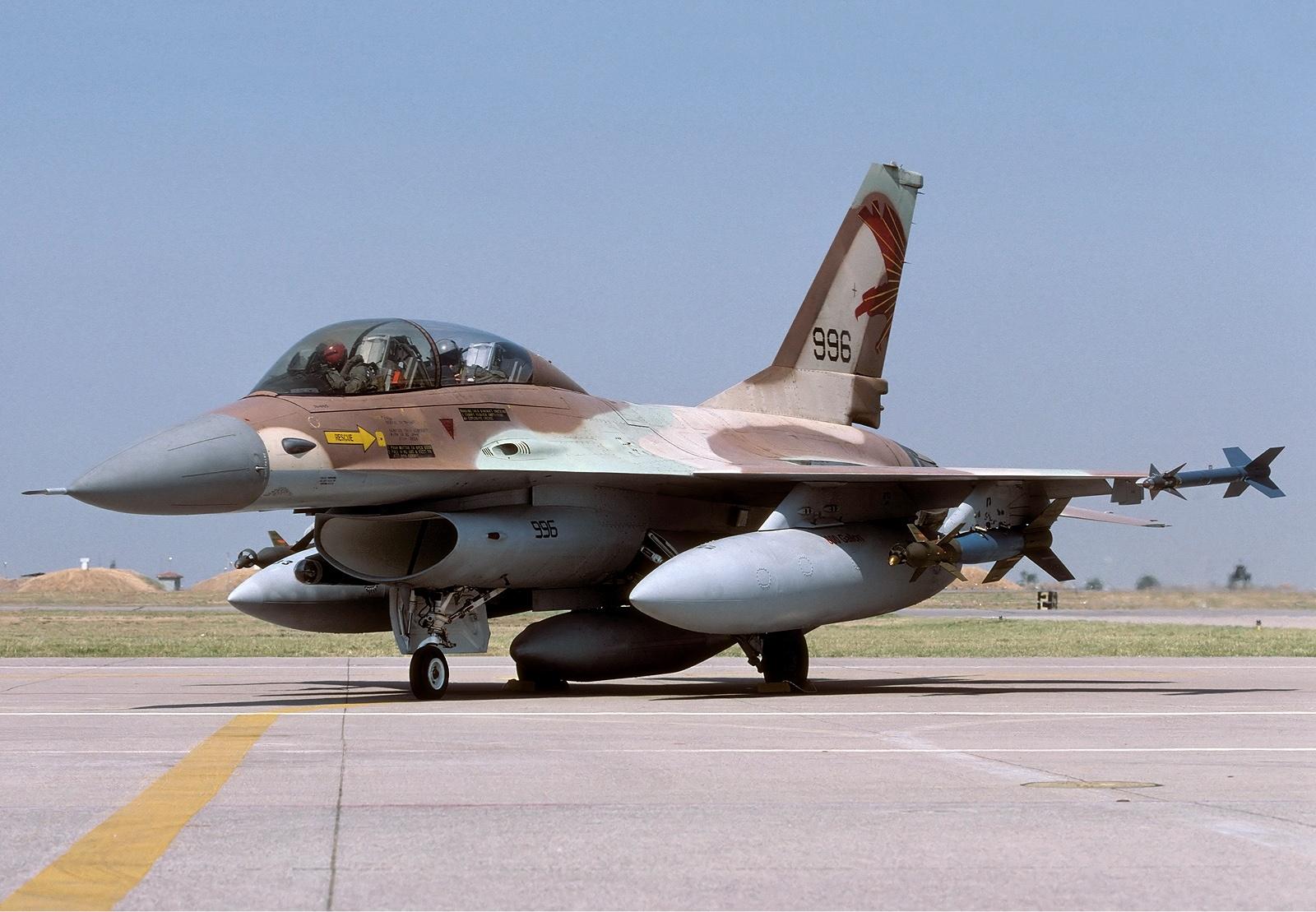
A two-seater F-16B Netz of 144 Squadron "Phoenix" (of "Negev" also) with three external fuel tanks during an exercise in 2001

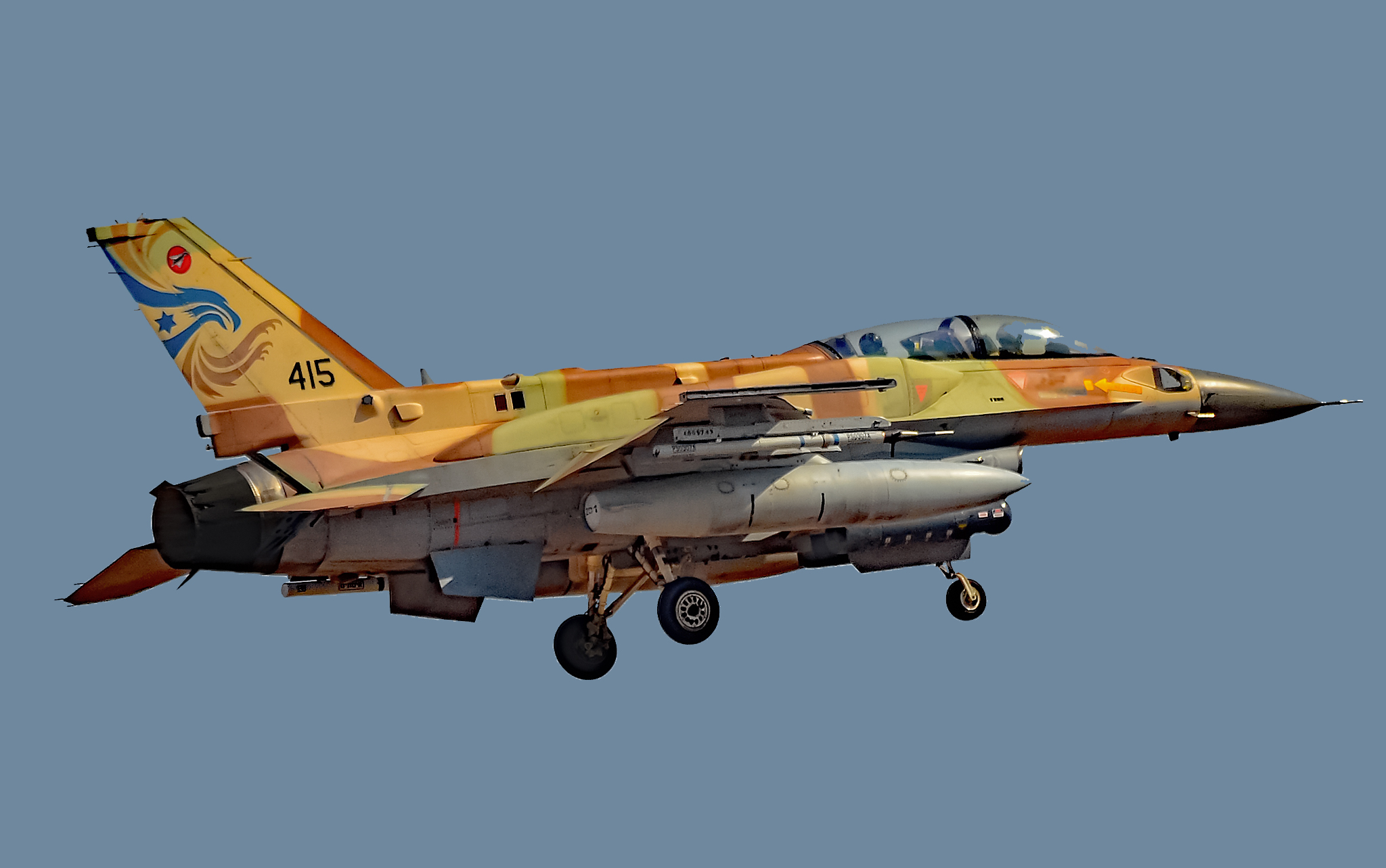
An F-16I Sufa of 253 Squadron "Negev" during Exercise Red Flag at Nellis Air Force Base near Las Vegas in August 2016

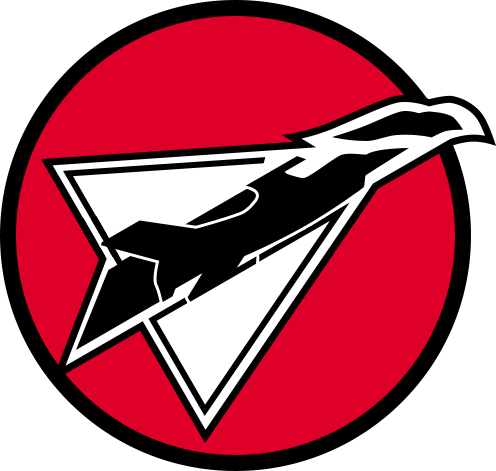
Current emblem of 253 Squadron "Negev"

On 6 September 2007, two F-16I Sufa jets of the "Negev" squadron took part in Operation Outside the Box, the attacking and destroying of an almost completed nuclear reactor in Syria. See also here.

=== Attack helicopters ===
After the Ramon Airbase had been a pure jet fighter base in the first years after its completion, it was expanded towards the end of the 1980s by the construction of a heliport to accommodate attack helicopters, which began arriving from the US in 1990.

==== 113 Squadron "Hornet" ====
The 113 Squadron "Hornet" or "Wasp" was founded in 1955 as a jet fighter squadron at Hatzor Airbase and equipped with French-made Dassault Ouragan jets. In 1973, these were replaced by Israeli-built IAI Nesher and then in 1976 by improved IAI Kfir jets. The squadron was closed in 1986, but reopened in September 1990 at Ramon Airbase with AH-64A Apache Peten attack helicopters from the USA. From 2005 onwards, these were replaced by improved AH-64D Apache Longbow Saraf, and their AH-64As were passed on to the 190 Squadron at Ramon.

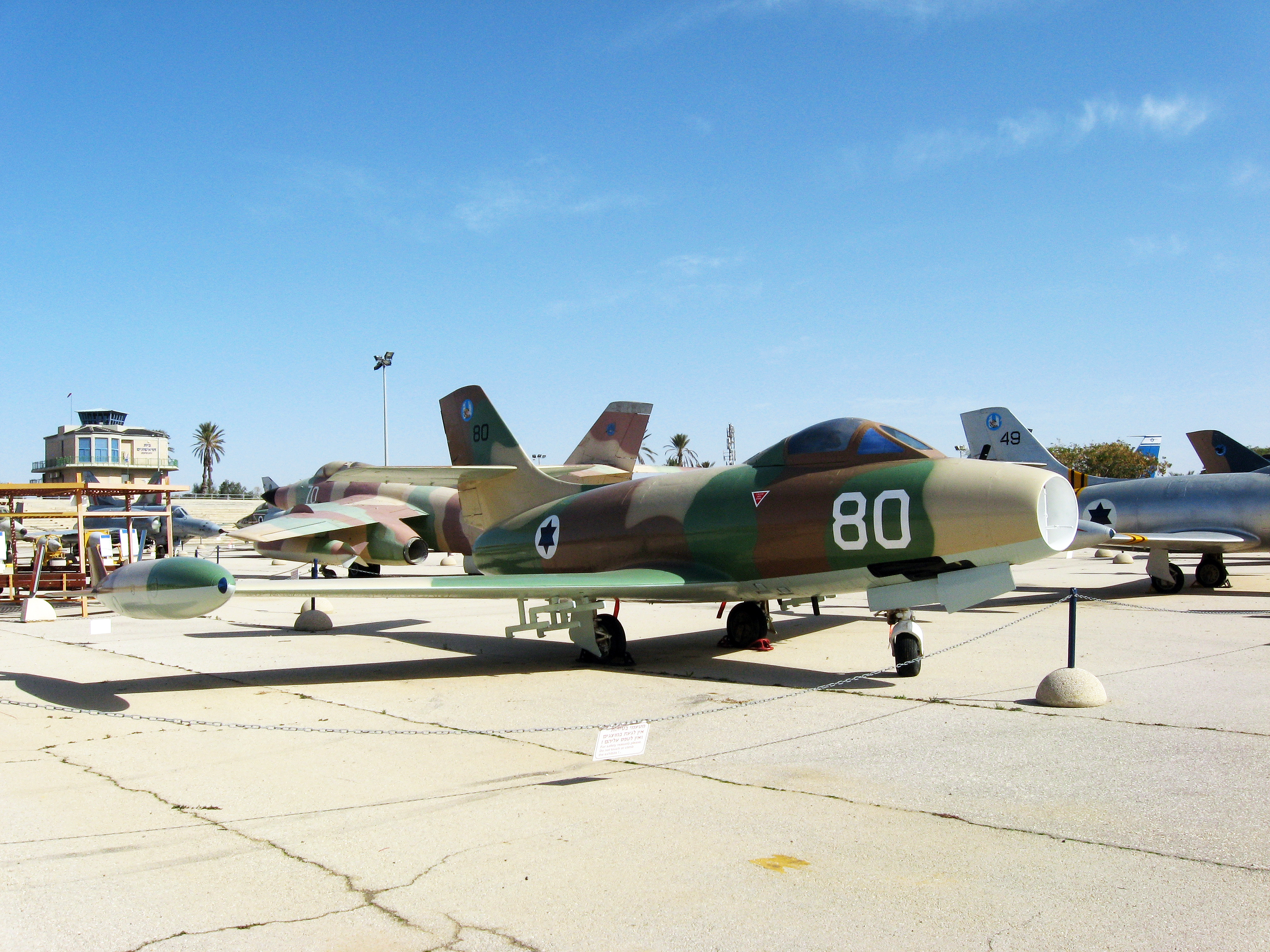
A Dassault Ouragan of 107 Squadron "Lion's Head" at the IAF Museum near Hatzerim Airbase in 2010

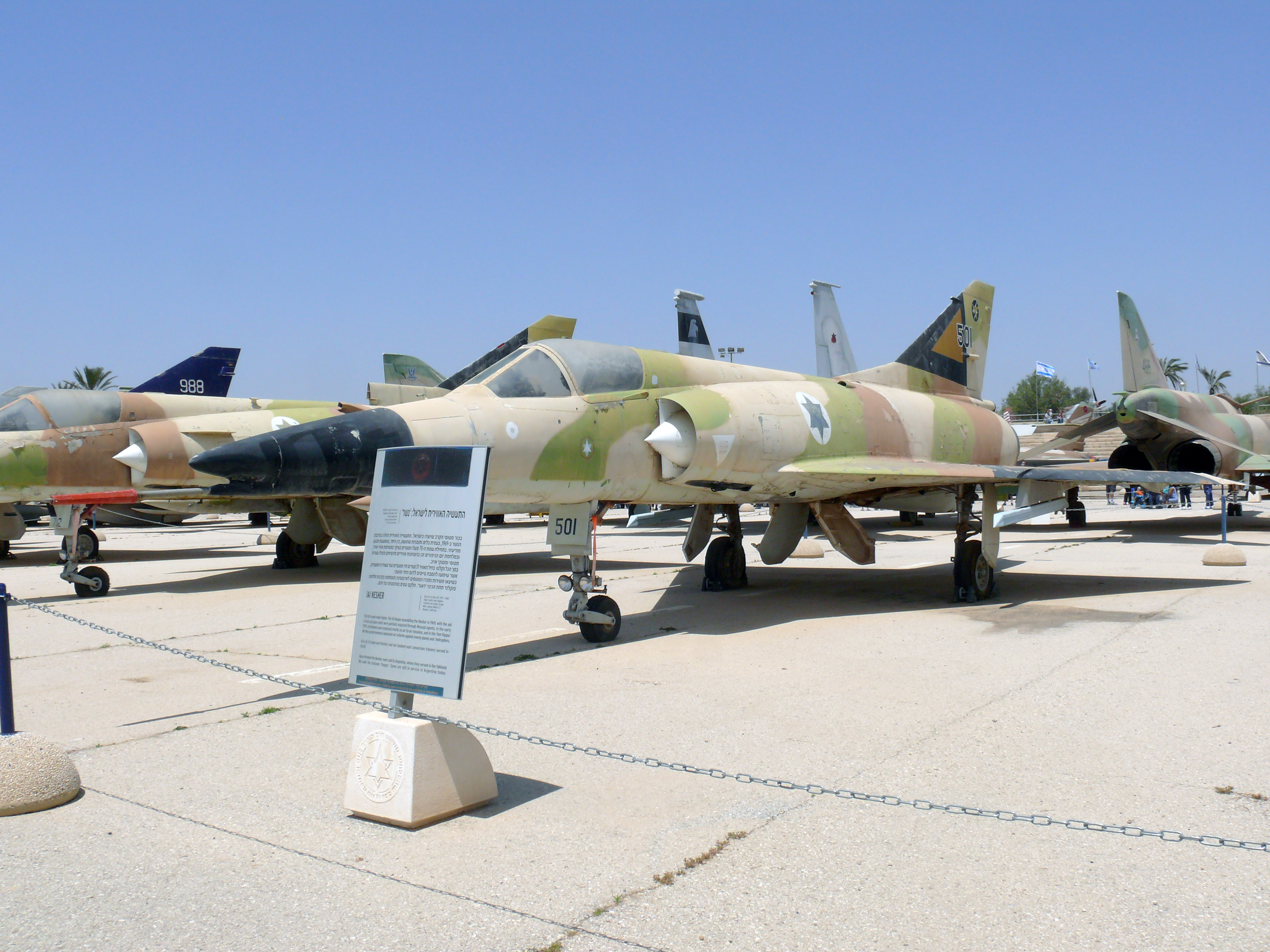
An IAI Nesher of 113 Squadron "Hornet" at the IAF Museum near Hatzerim Airbase in 2014

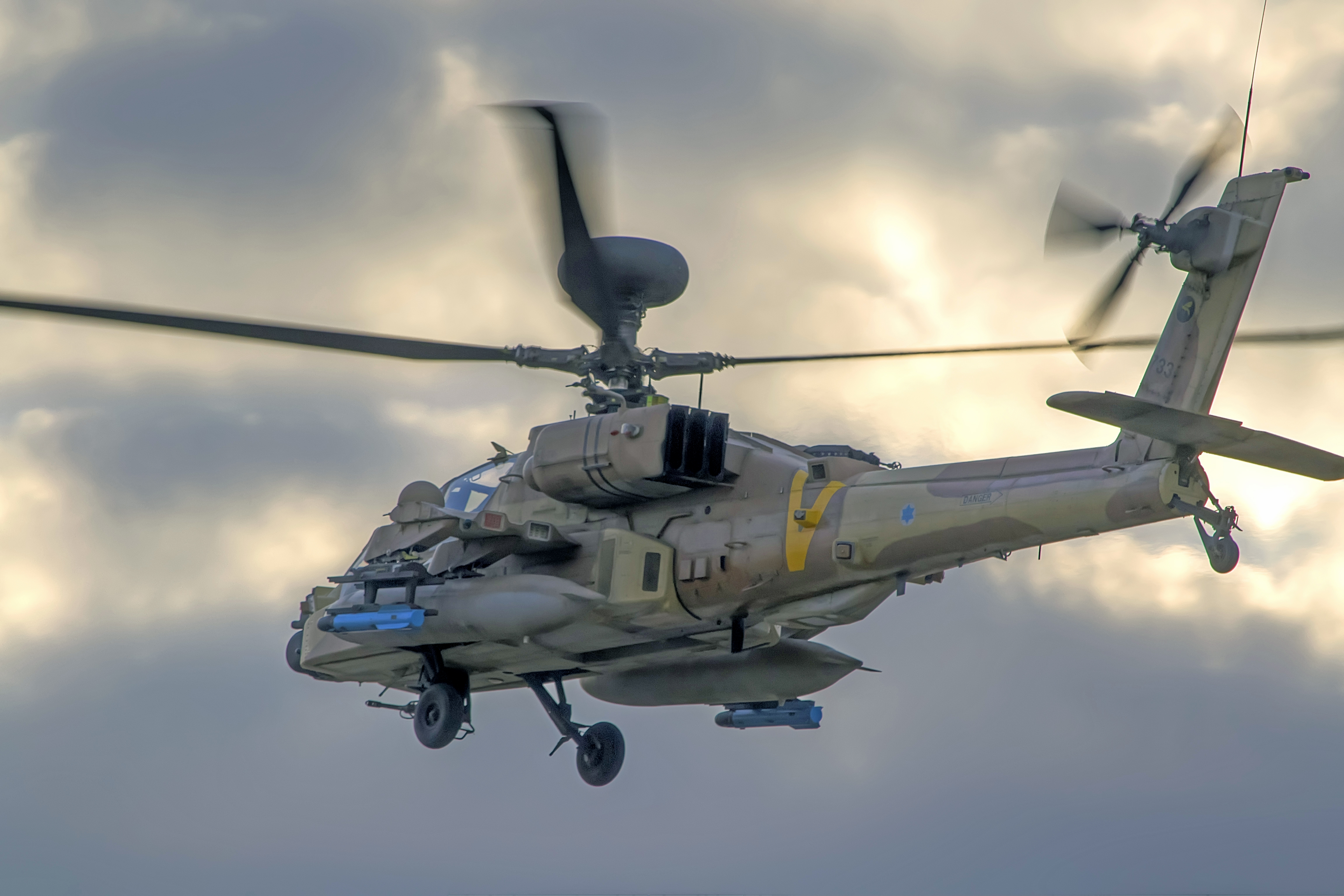
An AH-64D Apache Longbow Saraf attack helicopter of 113 Squadron "Hornet" during an exercise in 2012

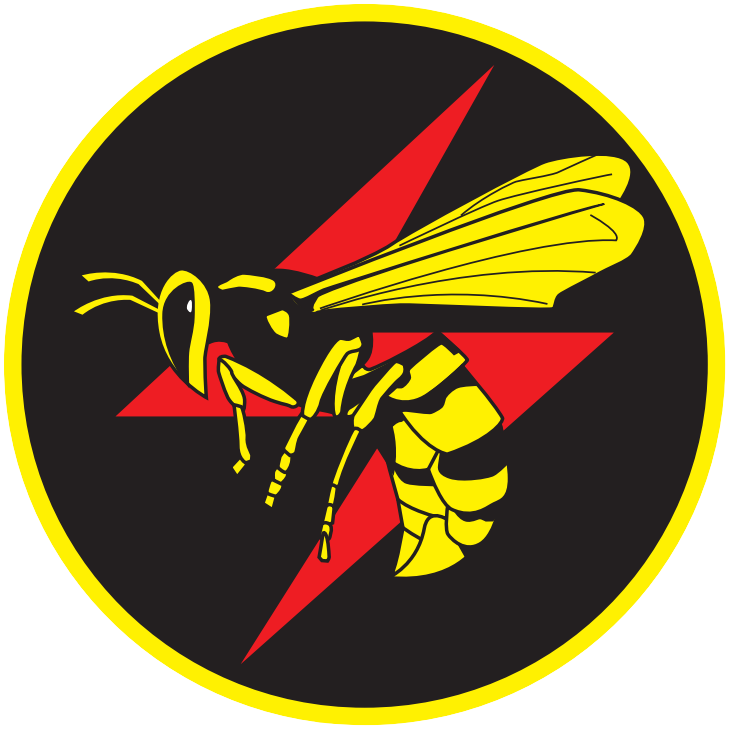
Current emblem of 113 Squadron "Hornet"

==== 190 Squadron "Magic Touch" ====
The 190 Squadron "Magic Touch" was established in 1980 at Palmachim Airbase with MD 500 Defender multi-role helicopters. In 1995, it relocated to Ramon Airbase and became the second attack helicopter squadron in the Israeli Air Force to receive the AH-64A Apache Peten. In 2005, it also received all AH-64As from the 113 Squadron, which converted to the advanced AH-64D Apache Longbow Saraf.

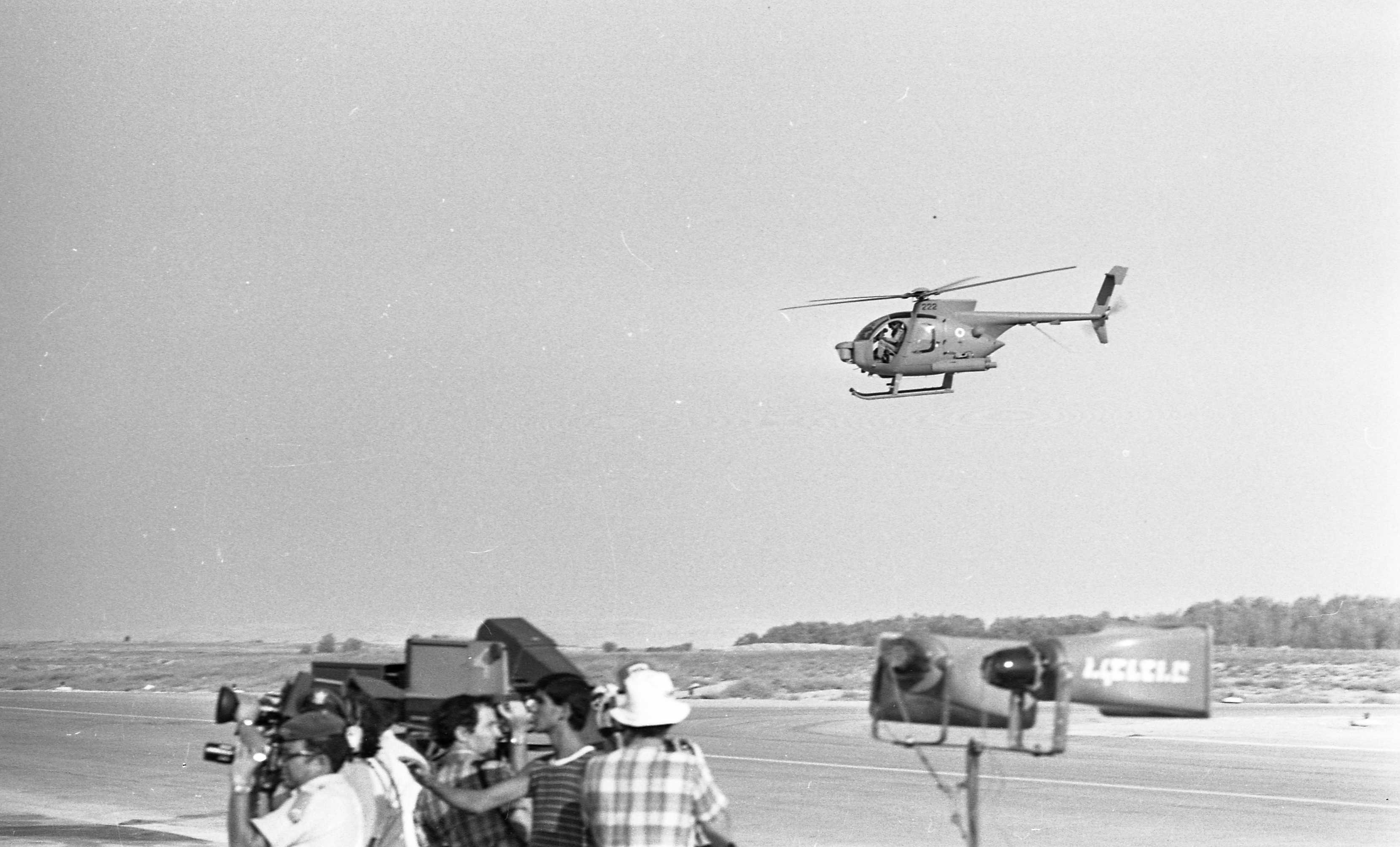
An MD 500 Defender multi-role helicopter of 190 Squadron "Magic Touch" during an air show in 1981

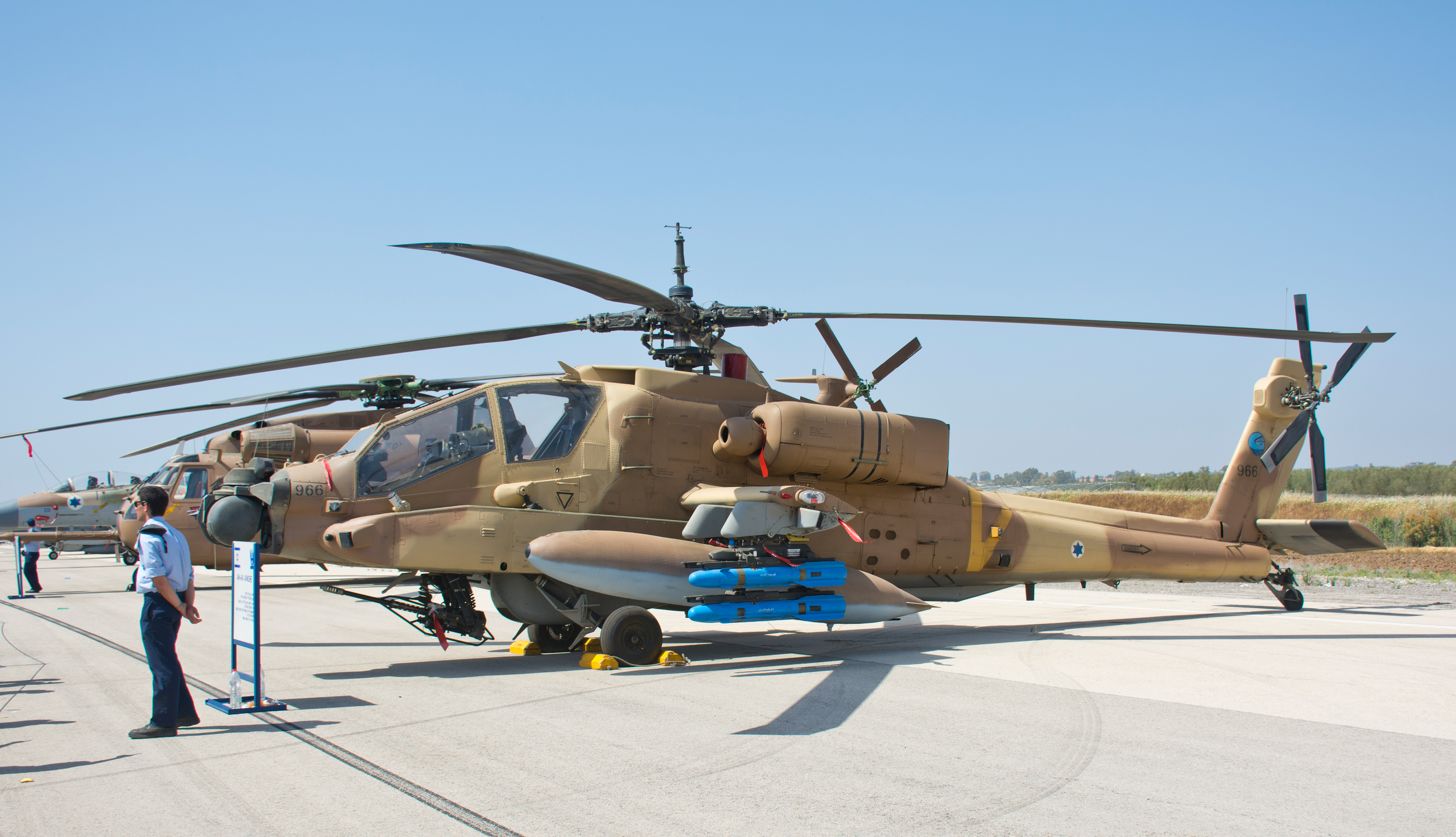
An AH-64A Apache Peten attack helicopter of 190 Squadron "Magic Touch" at an exhibition in 2017

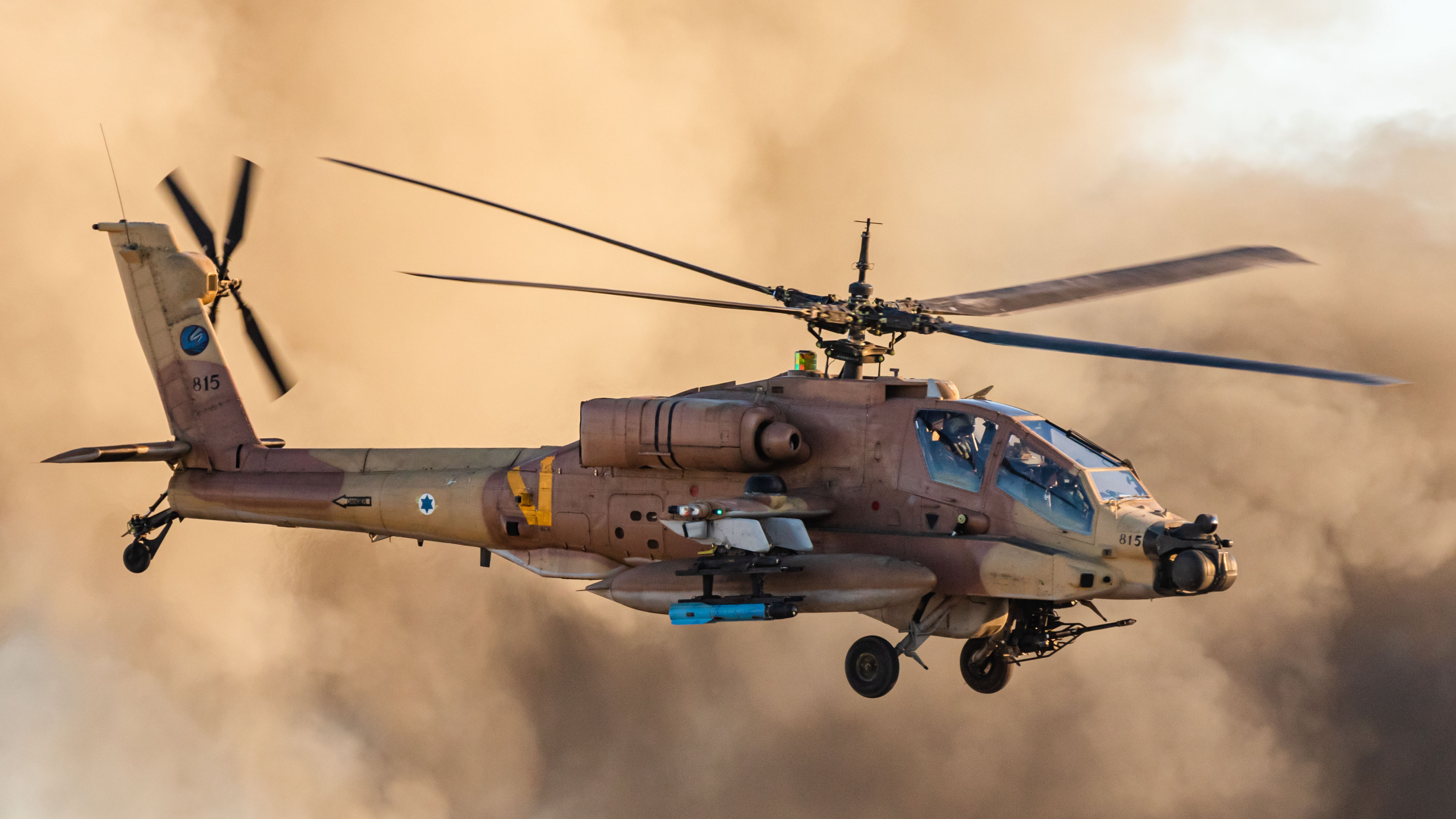
An AH-64A Apache Peten of 190 Squadron "Magic Touch" during an exercise in December 2019

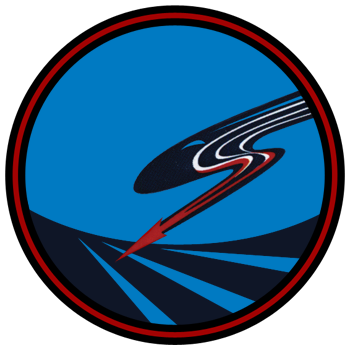
Current emblem of 190 Squadron "Magic Touch"

=== Operation Outside the Box ===
On 6 September 2007, in Operation Outside the Box, four F-16I Sufa jets from Ramon – two of the "Bat" and two of the "Negev" squadron – and four F-15I Ra'am of the "Hammers" squadron from Hatzerim Airbase attacked an almost completed nuclear reactor in Syria and destroyed it in order to prevent Syria from building its own nuclear bombs. More than ten years later, on 21 March 2018, Israel officially admitted the attack.

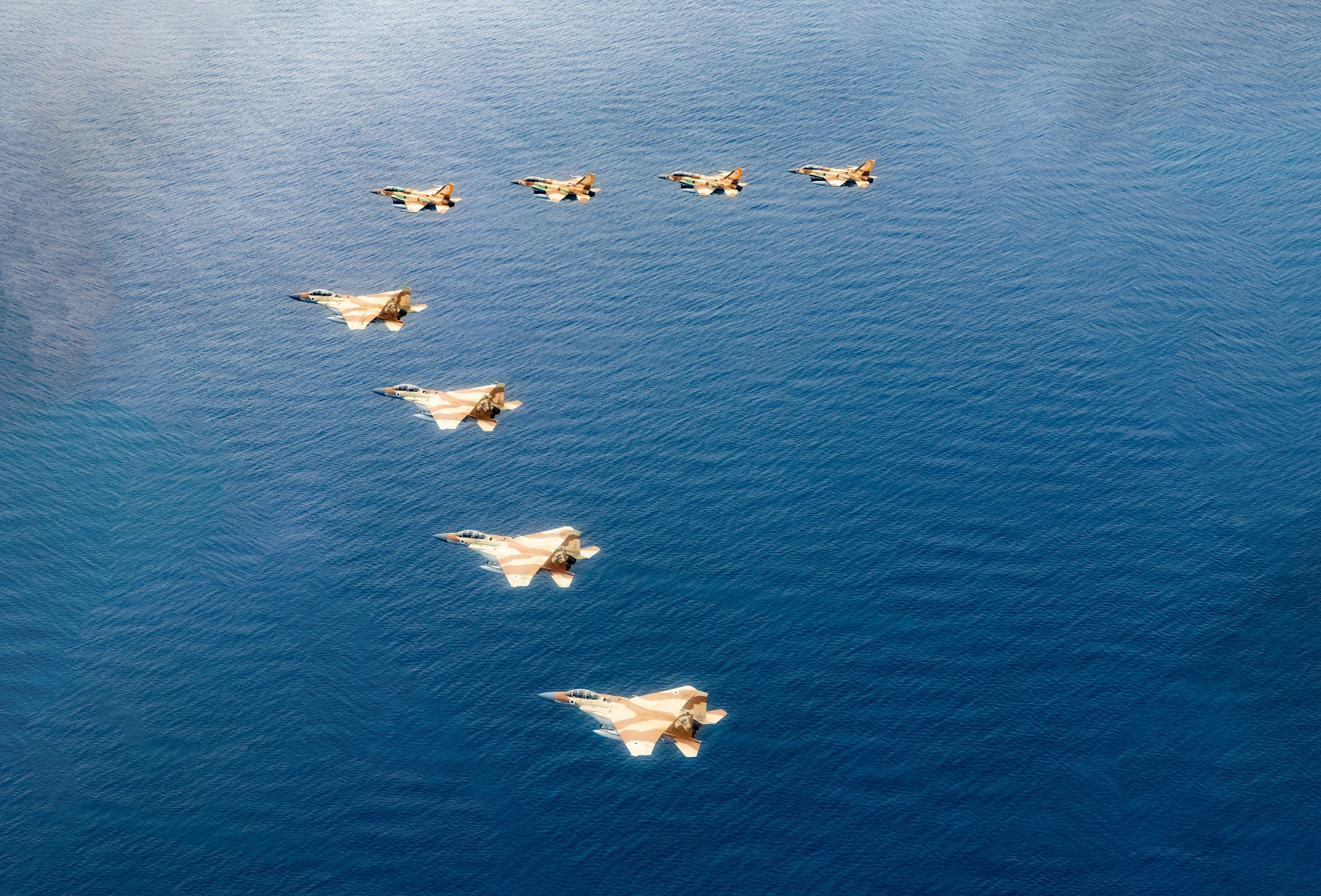
Four F-15I (front) and four F-16I, like the ones which carried out the attack, during an exercise in April 2021

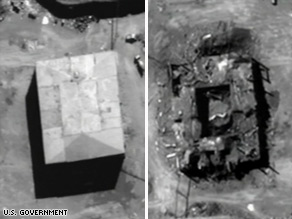
The Syrian nuclear reactor before and after destruction by Operation Outside the Box in 2007

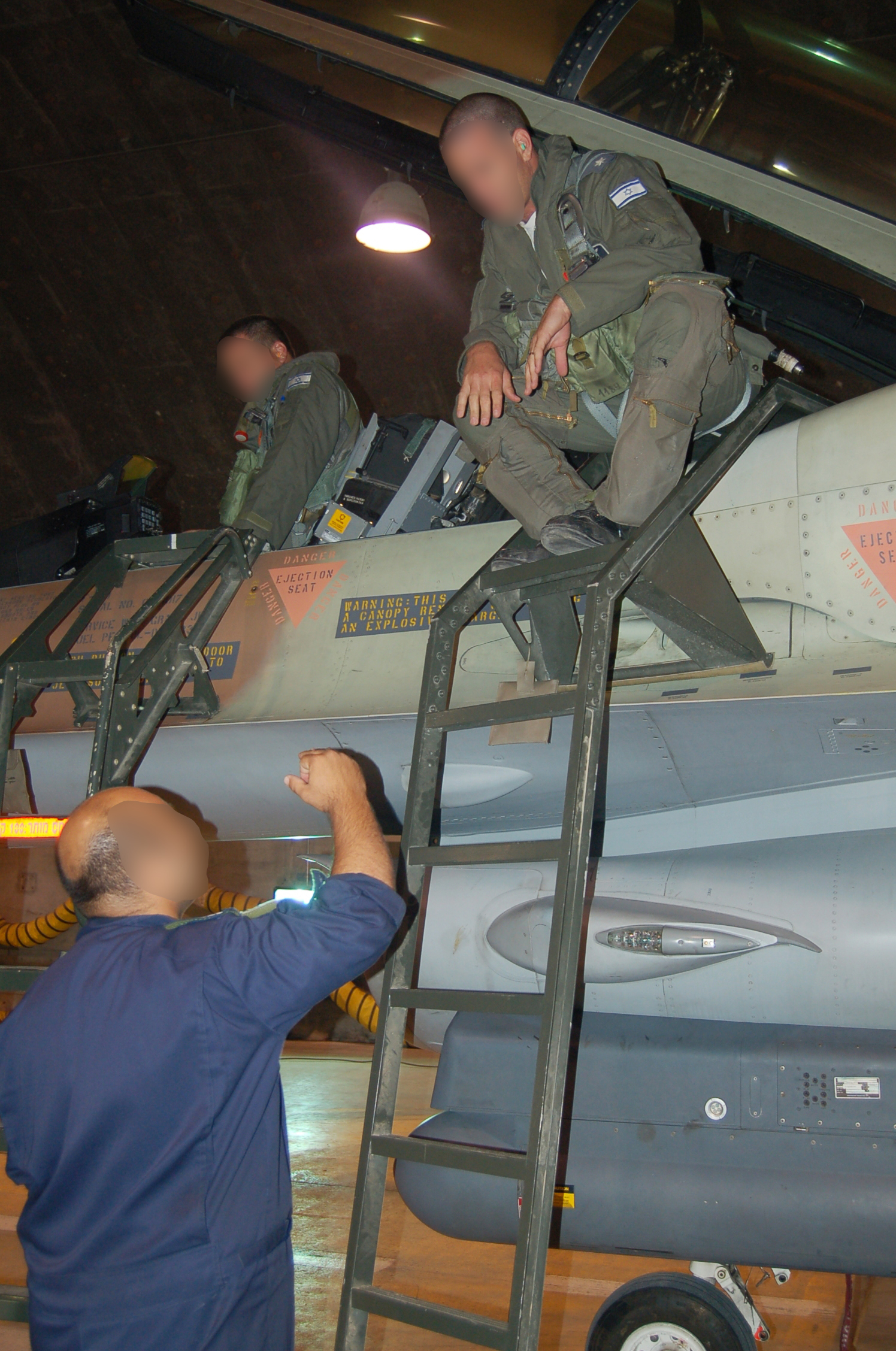
Pilot and navigator (WSO) are getting out of their F-16I at Ramon Airbase after the operation in 2007

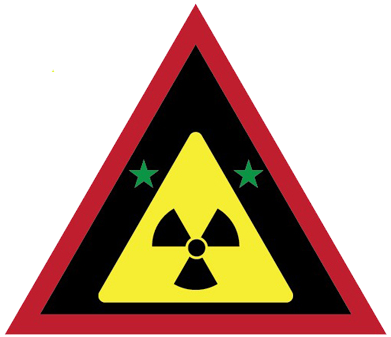
The badge of Operation Outside the Box, which was subsequently attached to the jets involved

== Today ==
In the heart of the Negev desert lies one of the most active and powerful bases of the IAF. Equipped with three squadrons of F-16I Sufa fighter jets and two squadrons of AH-64A/D Apache (Longbow) Peten/Saraf attack helicopters, the Ramon Airbase is able to respond to and combat threats of all kinds around the clock. The weapons systems used are always ready for use and kept up to date.

To ensure the success of missions, constant training is essential, both day and night. The extensive areas of the Negev desert in the vicinity of the airbase offer the best conditions for this, e.g. in and around the huge erosion crater Makhtesh Ramon, which begins a few kilometers to the south (see photo in the gallery below). International partners with their fighter jets are regularly invited to take part in exercises, e.g. in the Blue Flag exercise that takes place every two years at the Ovda Airbase about 90 kilometers to the south, which itself was only home to one aggressor training squadron.

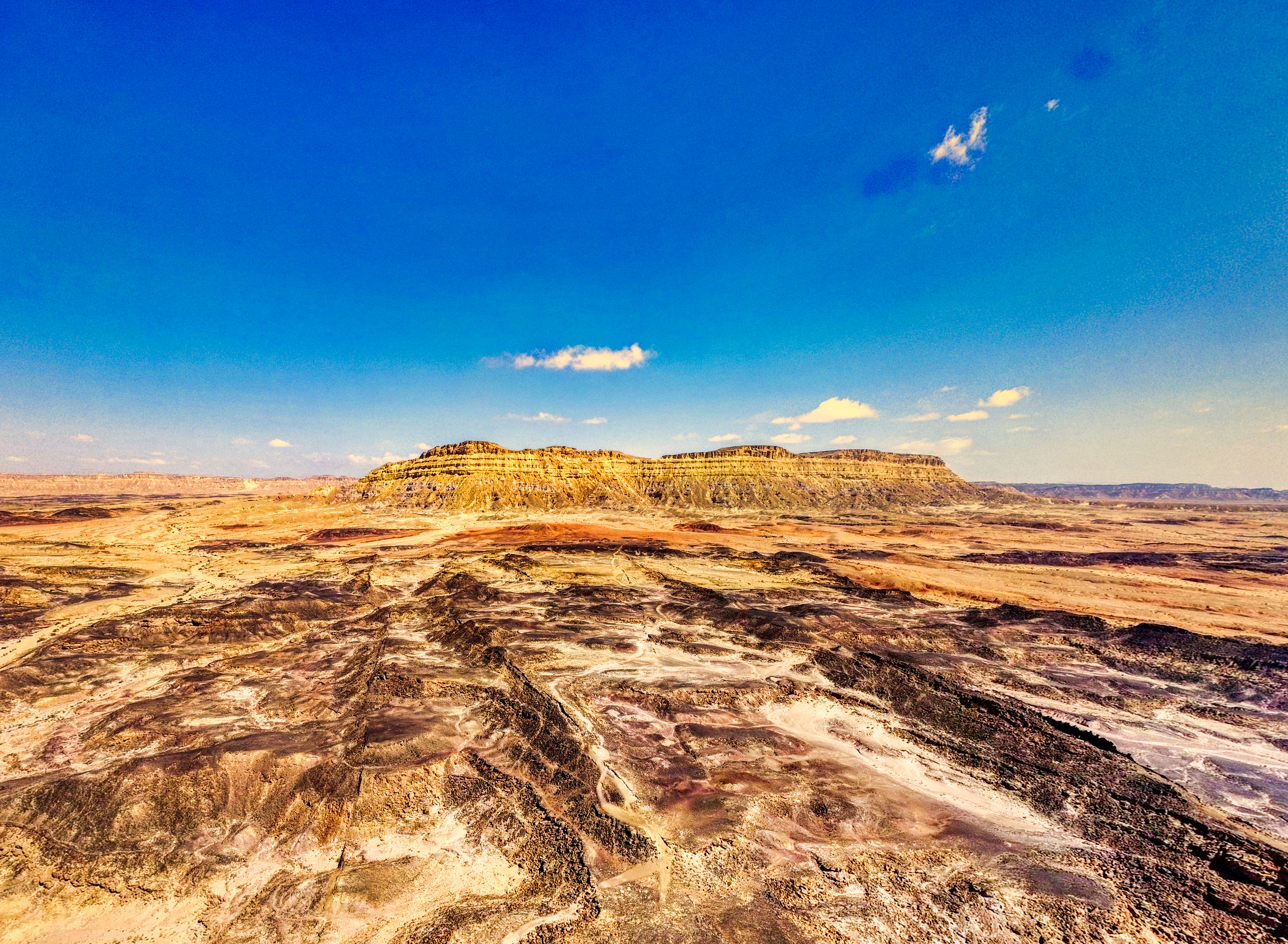
Mount Ardon in the middle of the Makhtesh Ramon, ideal training area for IAF jets and helicopters

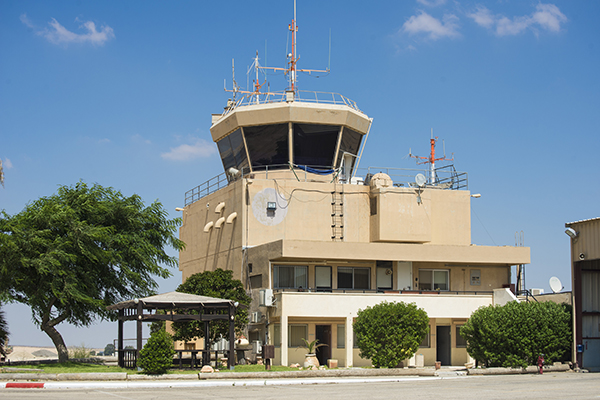
ATC Tower at Ramon Airbase in 2018

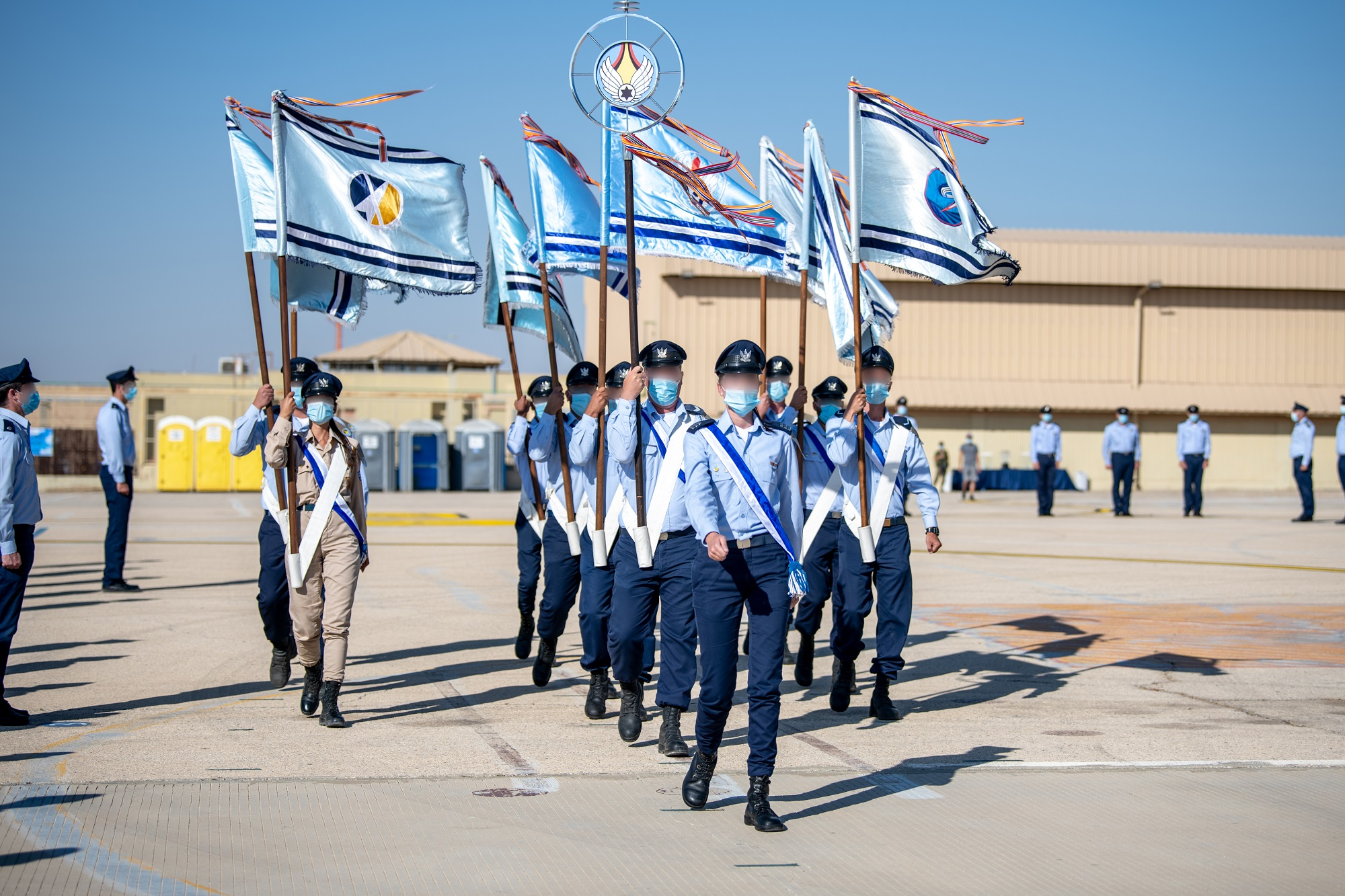
Change of command ceremony at Ramon Airbase in June 2020

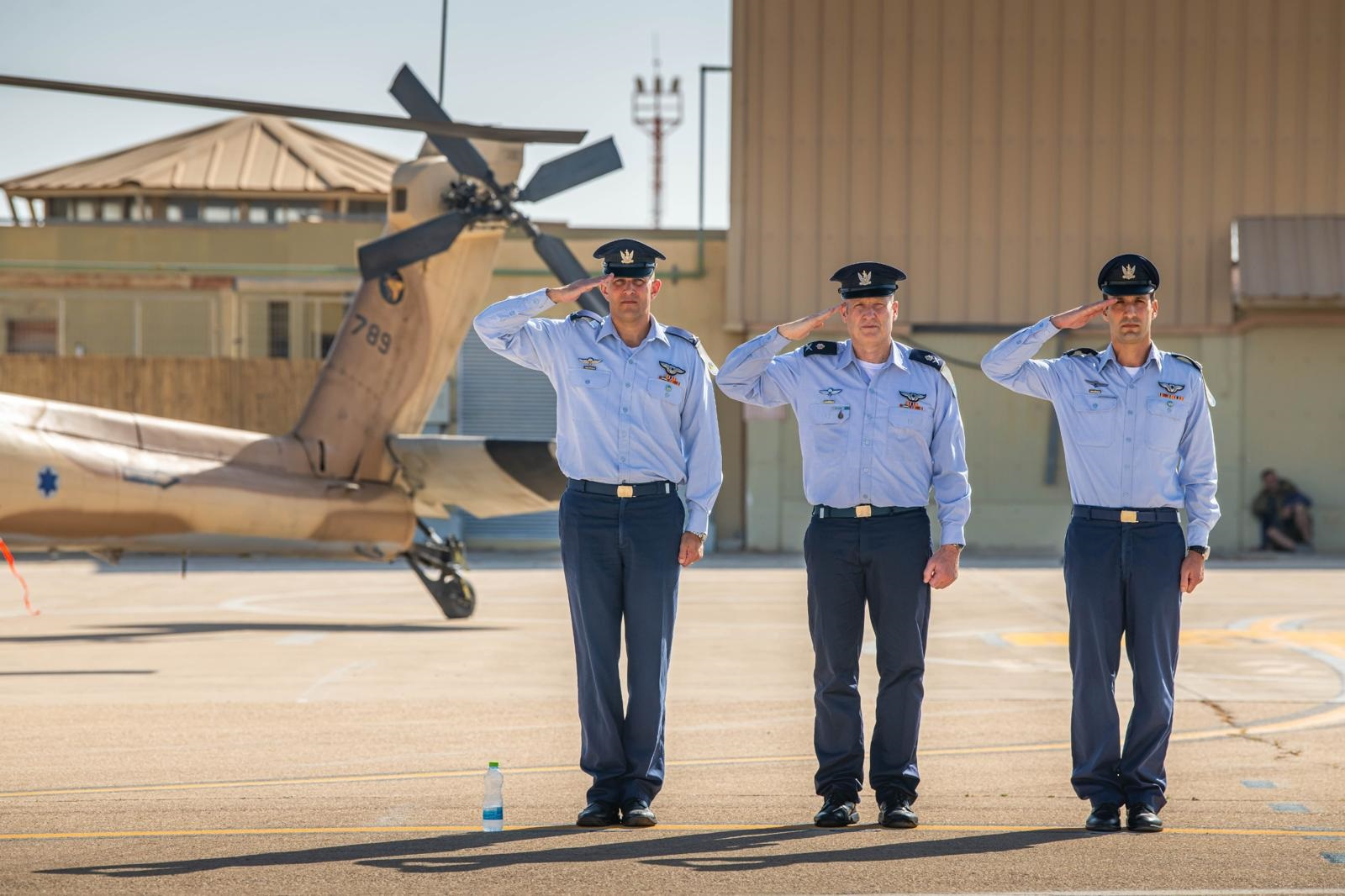
Then IAF commander Tomer Bar (centre) inducts new Ramon commander Nadav Bar (left), Aug. 2024

=== New attack helicopters ===
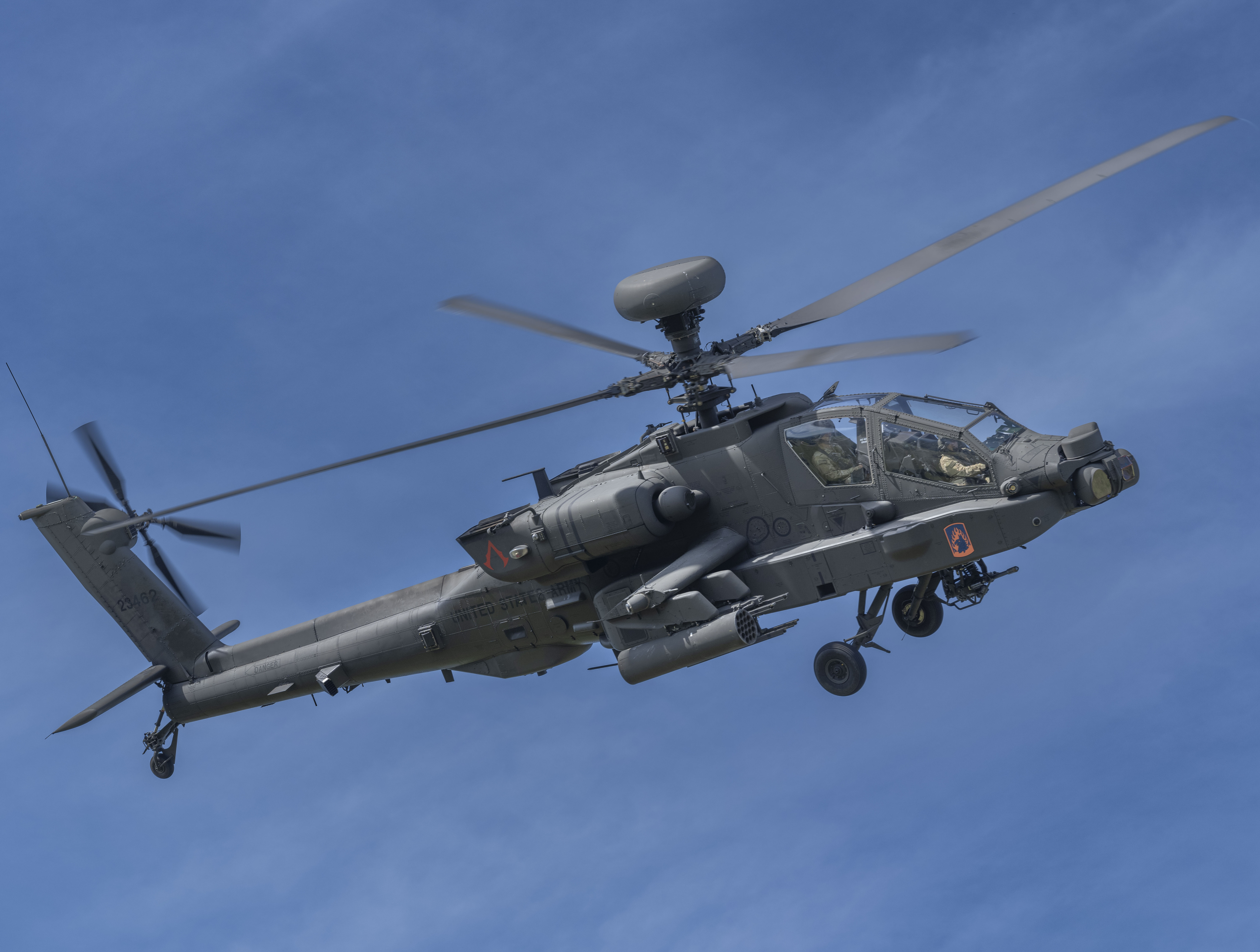
An AH-64E Apache Guardian of the US Army above Germany in August 2024

For many years there have been considerations of purchasing new AH-64E Apache Guardian helicopters from Boeing, but this has so far failed due to the costs. At the same time, the IAF's UAVs have been constantly developed and improved, as are those stationed at the Palmachim Airbase, among others. These UAVs have major advantages over helicopters when they do not have to be used for transport: they are much cheaper to purchase and maintain, have a greater range and endurance and the lives of pilots are not put at risk. In other countries, too, there are now considerable doubts as to whether attack helicopters are still effective and state of the art.

On 20 September 2025, it was surprisingly announced that Israel would purchase an additional 30 new AH-64E Apache Guardian attack helicopters, which would nearly double their number. This $3.8 billion share is part of a $6 billion arms deal with the United States, for which the Trump administration has already signaled its approval to the US Congress. However, the weapons would not be delivered for at least two to three years. It has not been announced whether the new attack helicopters will also be stationed on Ramon, which would have to be expanded. Another possible location would be Hatzerim Airbase, 50 kilometers further north. It already has a heliport and a squadron of UH-60 Black Hawk Yanshuf transport helicopters was stationed there until it relocated to Palmachim Airbase in 2015.

In mid-October 2026, it was announced that Israel and the U.S. government have signed a deal for the procurement of the first 12 new Apache attack helicopters. However, they will not be delivered until the early 2030s. More are expected to follow.

=== Secret long-range reconnaissance UAV ===
In mid-October 2024, leaked documents revealed the existence of a top-secret Israeli long-range reconnaissance UAV. The documents had emerged in connection with preparations for a military counterattack on Iran. The secret stealth UAVs are said to be stationed at the Ramon Airbase and to be able to reach Iran undetected from there. For some time now, satellite images of Ramon had shown two newly constructed secured areas next to the northern runway that could be suitable for this (30°46′54″N 34°40′18″E). There are several hangars and various smaller buildings in these, which indicate that aircraft of an unknown type are housed there.

At the end of October 2024, a video was released showing a mysterious stealth UAV off the coast of South Lebanon. The presumably Israeli aircraft, dubbed "RA-01" by military experts, bears a resemblance to the secret US UAV RQ-180, of which exist only a few snapshots also. Israel's classified UAVs are officially stationed in two squadrons at Ramat David Airbase southeast of Haifa.

=== More UAV hangars ===
During 2025, the latest satellite imagery of Ramon revealed another facility under construction north of the runways, which could soon house even more UAVs (see satellite view on Google Maps: 30°46′47″N 34°39′52″E). This is further evidence that the IAF will rely primarily on UAVs in the future, at the expense of attack helicopters.

== Units ==
- 113 Squadron "Hornet" – operating AH-64D Apache Longbow Saraf
- 119 Squadron "Bat" – operating F-16I Sufa
- 190 Squadron "Magic Touch" – operating AH-64A Apache Peten
- 201 Squadron "The One" – operating F-16I Sufa
- 253 Squadron "Negev" – operating F-16I Sufa
- Special units of the IDF: Sky Rider Unit, Meitar Unit and David's Sling Brigade
- Secret stealth UAV squadron with hangars north of the runways
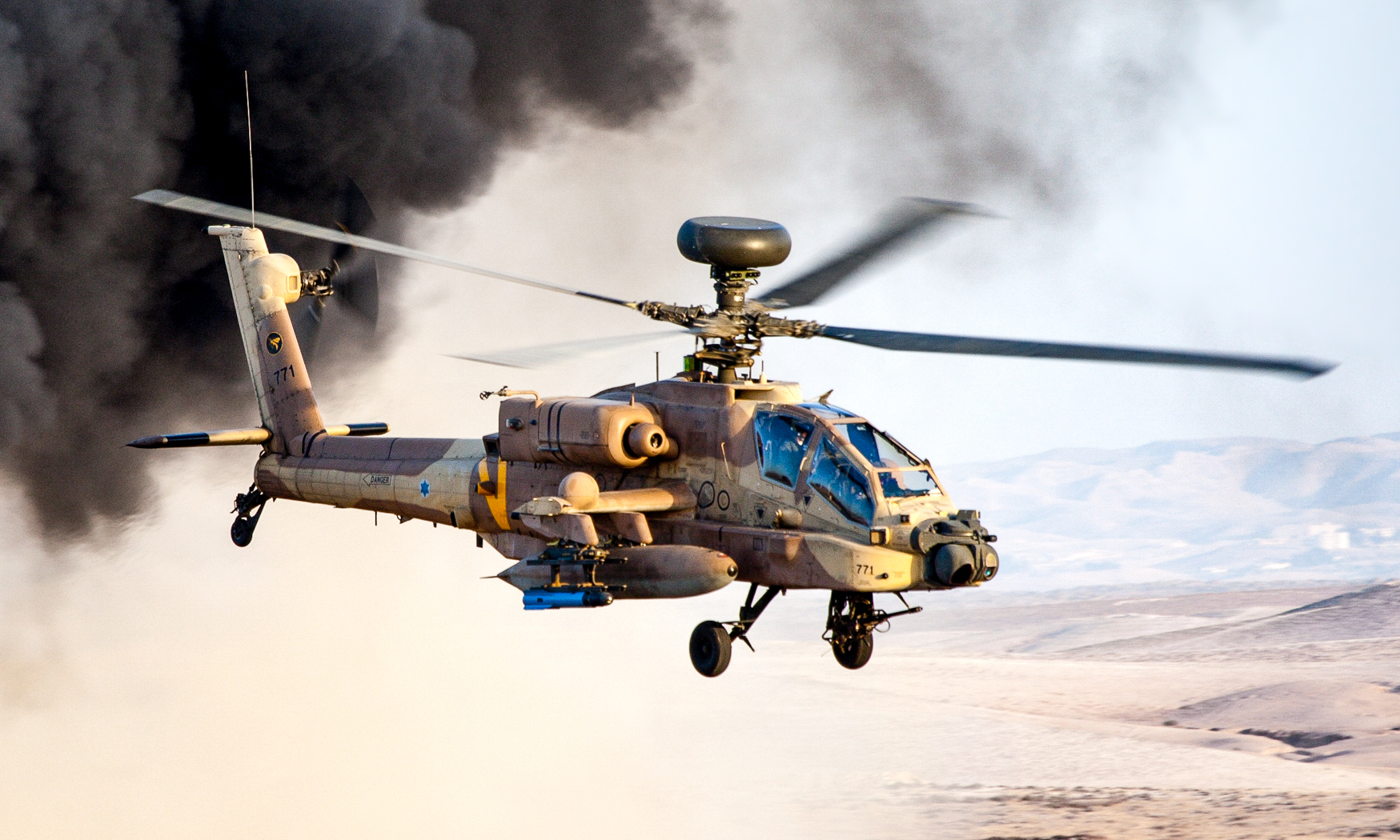
An AH-64D Apache Longbow Saraf of 113 Squadron "Hornet" during an exercise in 2010

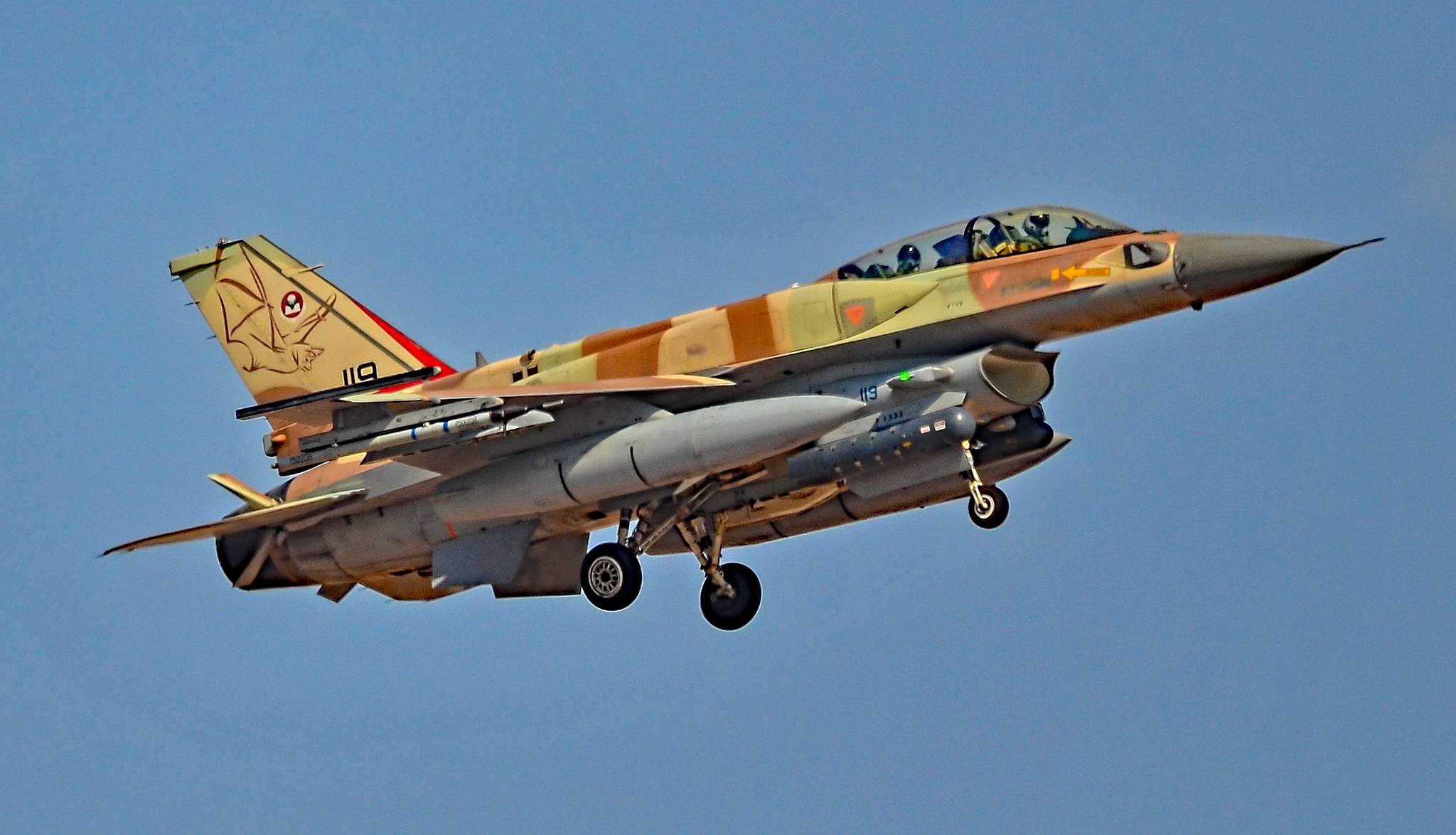
An F-16I Sufa of 119 Squadron "Bat" during an international exercise in August 2016

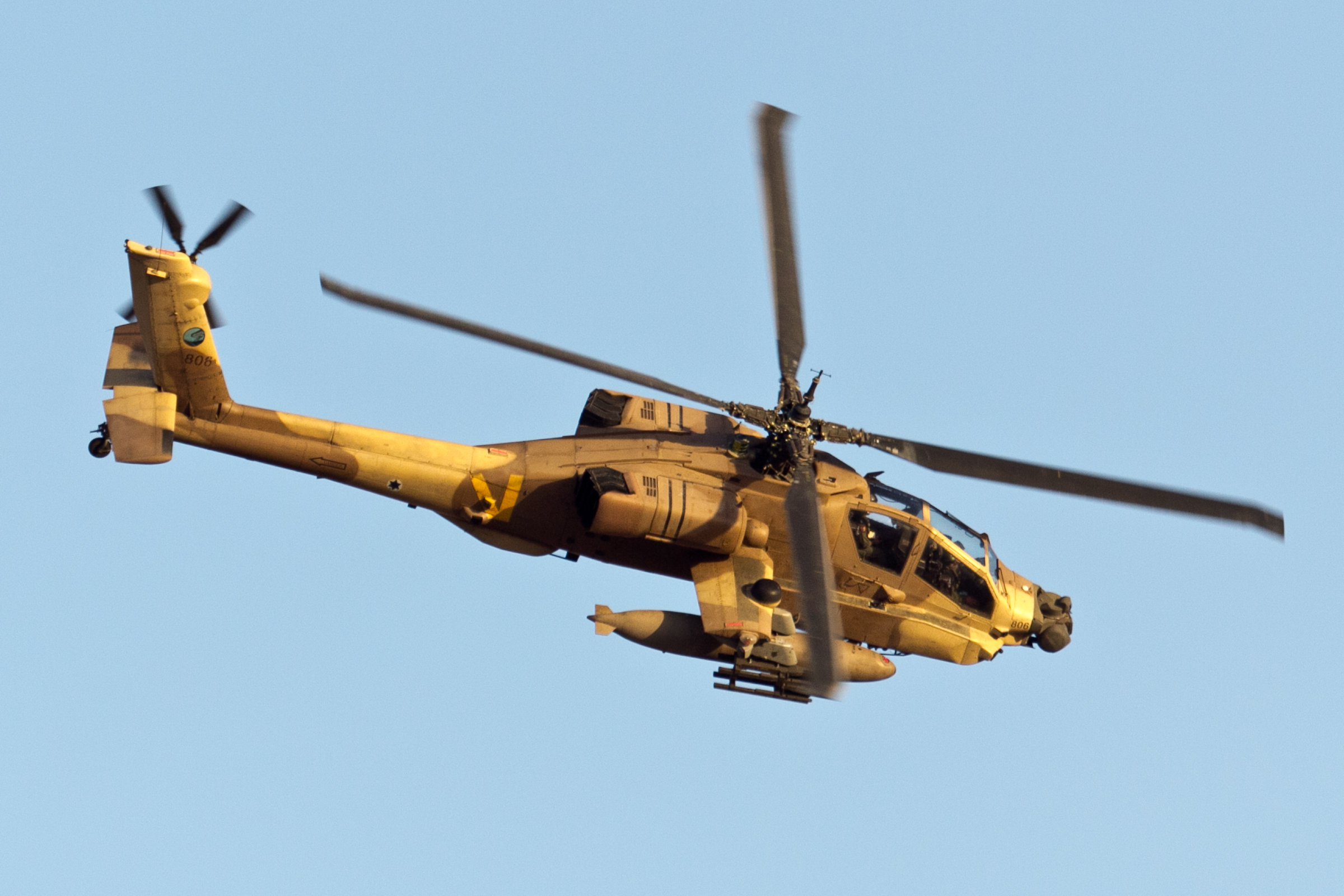
An AH-64A Apache Peten attack helicopter of 190 Squadron "Magic Touch" in June 2013

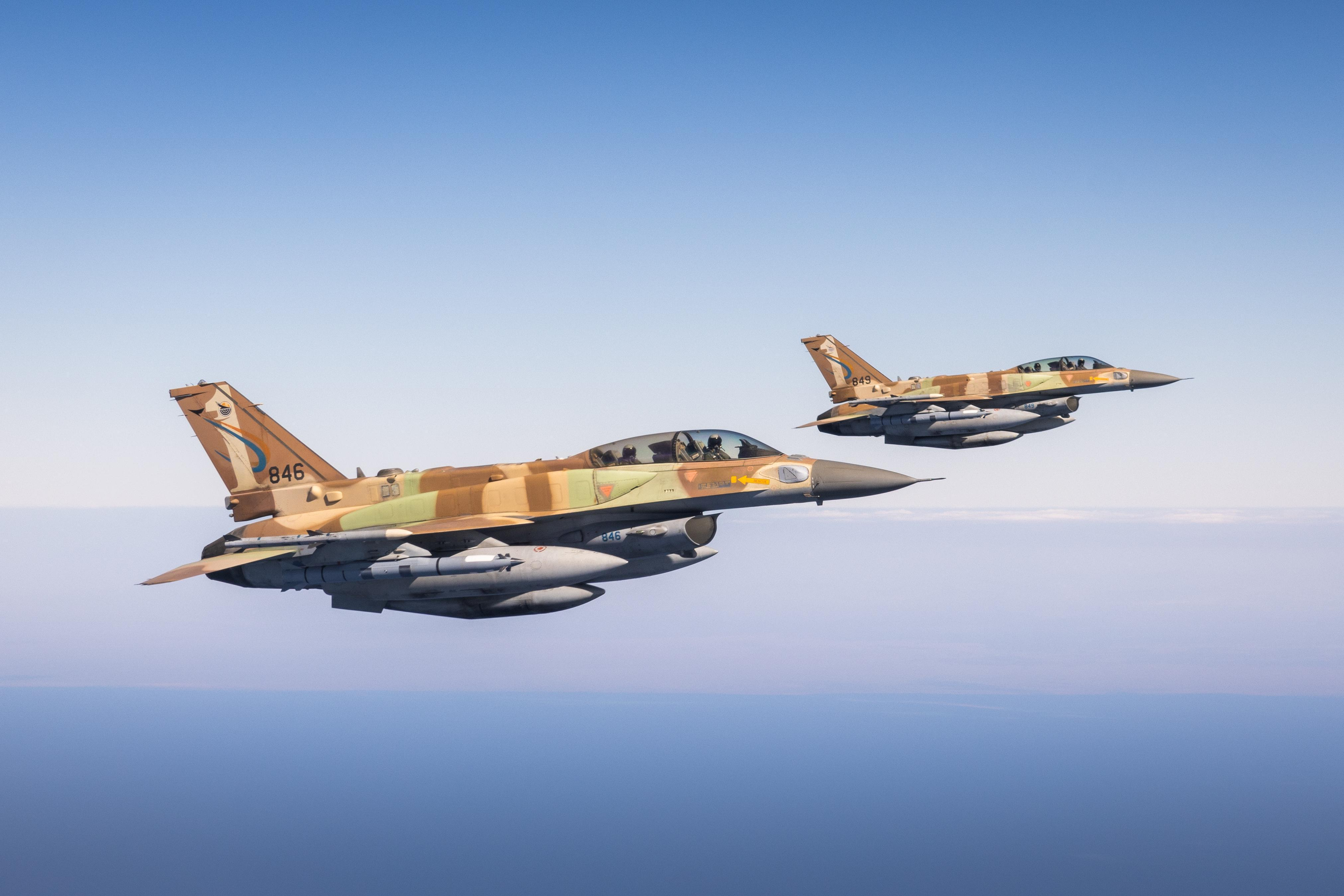
Two F-16I Sufa of 201 Squadron "The One" from Ramon high above Israel in January 2025

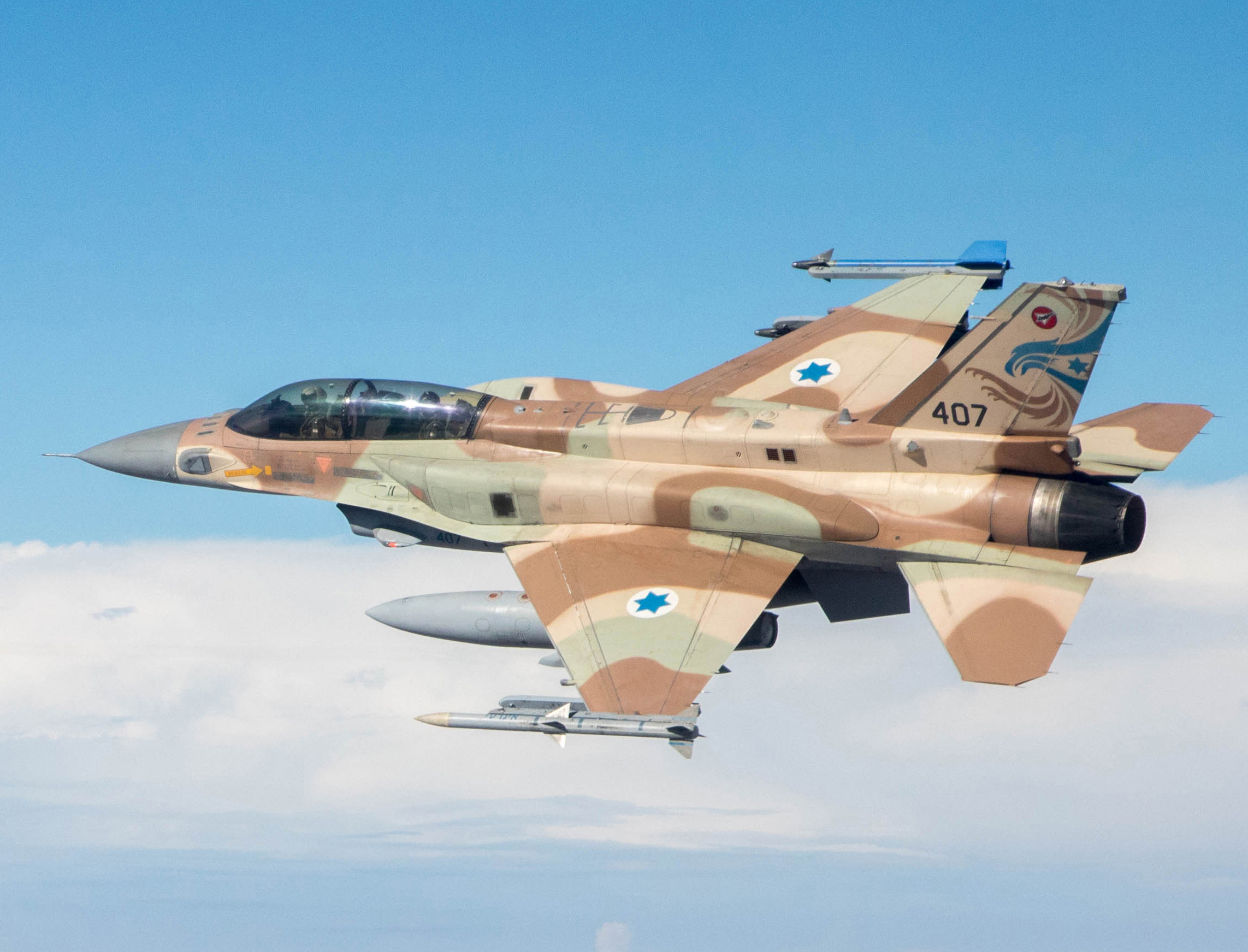
An F-16I Sufa of 253 Squadron "Negev" during an exercise in Dezember 2016

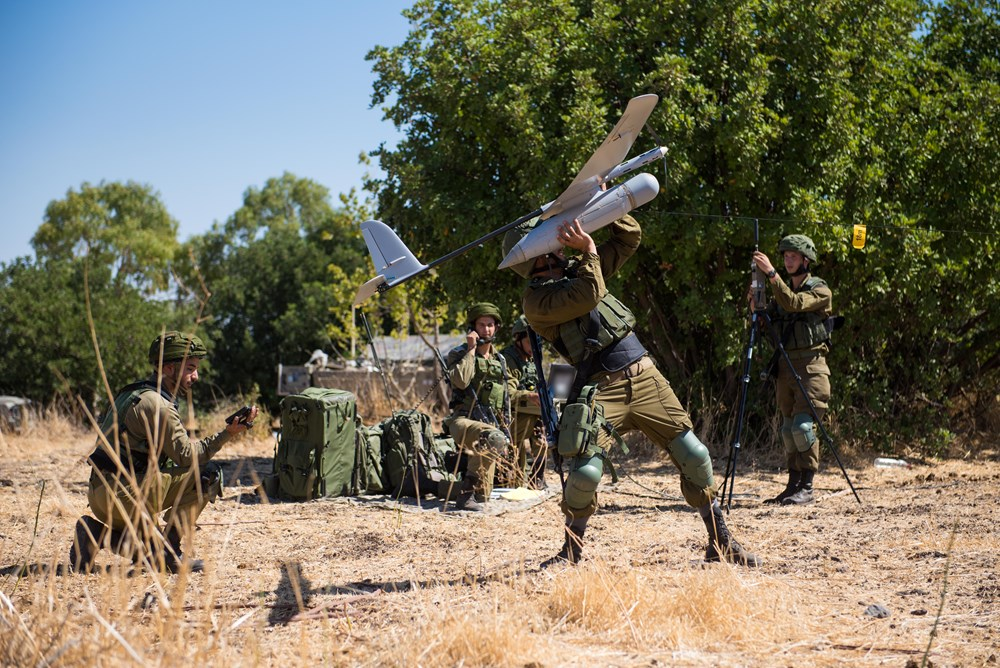
The Sky Rider Unit in action with a small Skylark UAV in January 2018

Note: IAF aircraft can usually be assigned to their squadron by the symbols on the tail

== Accidents and incidents ==
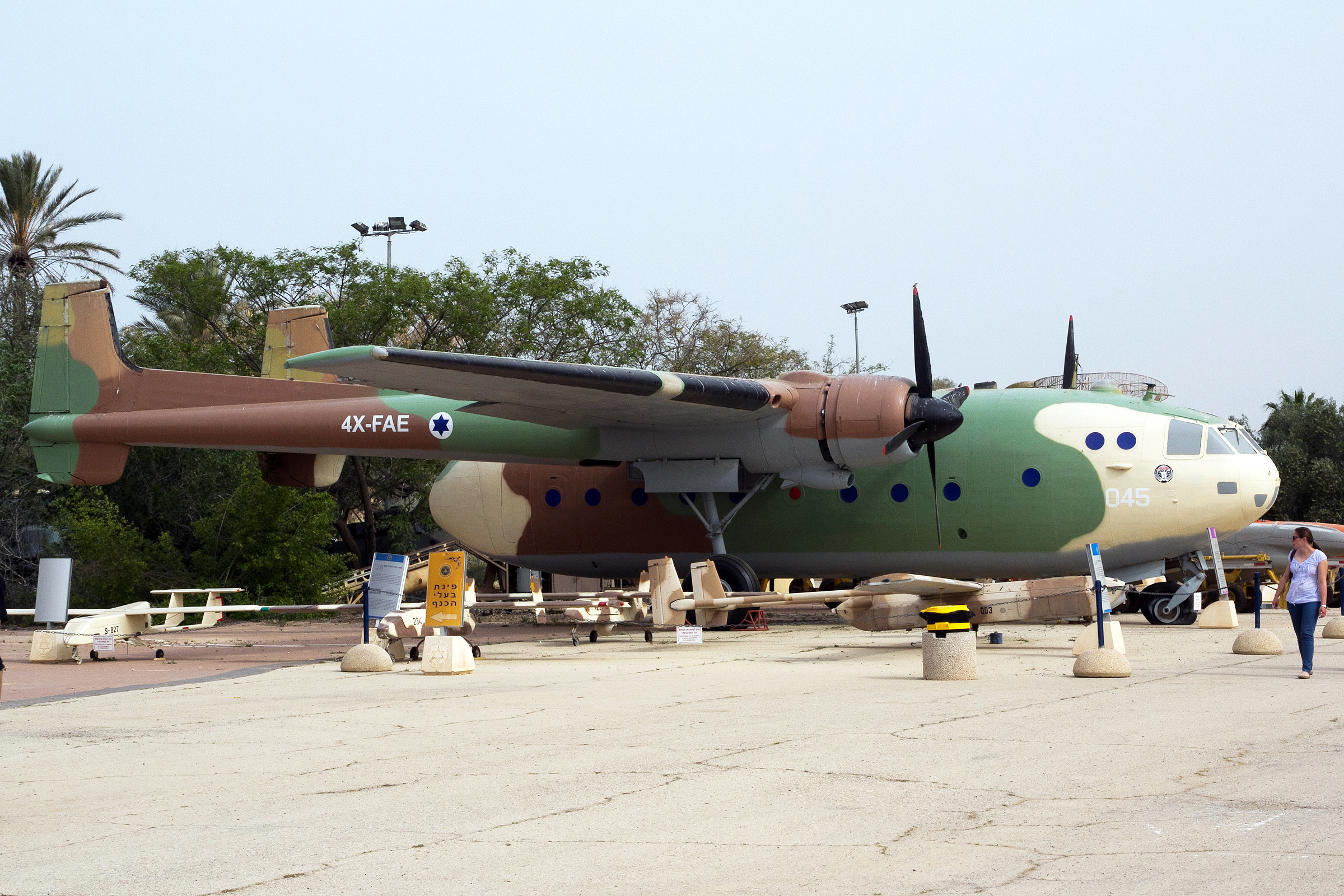
An identical Nord Noratlas transport aircraft at the IAF Museum near Hatzerim Airbase

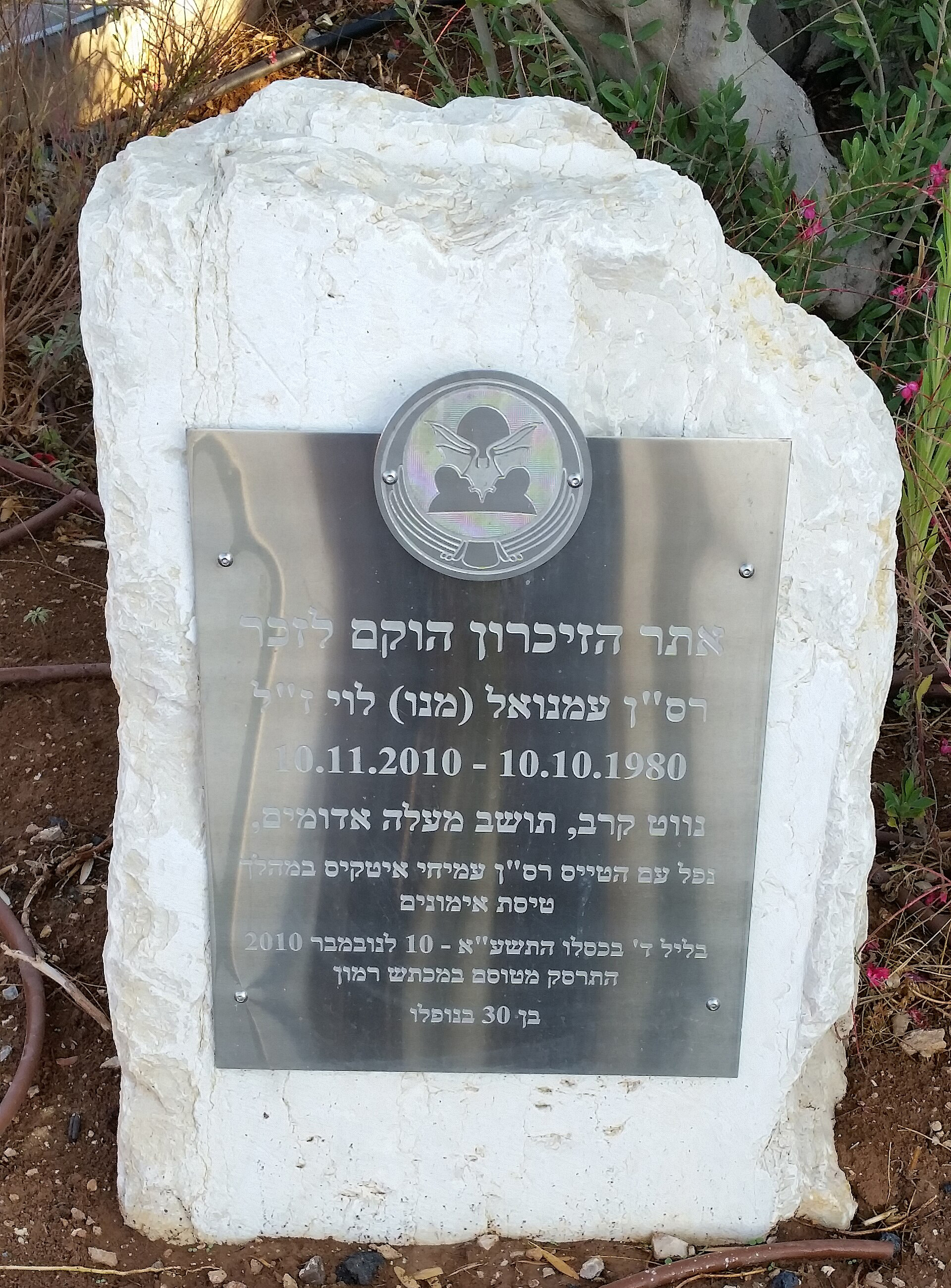
Memorial plaque for Emanuel "Manu" Levy, crashed at 10 November 2010 over the Makhtesh Ramon

- On 29 April 1964, a Nord Noratlas 2501D of the IAF (Aircraft registration 4X-FAD/044) flew into a mountain near the Ramon Airbase. In this CFIT (Controlled flight into terrain) all 9 occupants were killed, the two pilots and the 7 passengers. It was the former GC+231 of the German Air Force (Deutsche Luftwaffe).
- In May 1983, an F-15D Eagle Baz and an A-4 Skyhawk Ayit collided in mid-air during an exercise over the Negev Desert in southern Israel. While the A-4 pilot ejected, the two-seat F-15D managed to land safely at the nearby Ramon base, although its right wing was almost completely torn off in the collision. This was only possible because the F-15 pilot turned on the afterburners, compensating for the lack of lift. The landing took place at about twice the normal speed, and the jet only came to a stop shortly before the end of the runway.
- On 19 July 2006, during the Second Lebanon War, an F-16I Sufa of the 119 Squadron "Bat" crash-landed on the Ramon runway. The pilot and navigator were rescued, but the aircraft was so badly damaged that it could not be repaired.
- On 10 November 2010, an F-16I Sufa of the 119 Squadron "Bat" crashed over the Makhtesh Ramon during an exercise. The pilot and navigator died in the crash. It was the second crash of this type of aircraft in the IAF.
- On 5 October 2016, an F-16I Sufa from 119 Squadron crashed while landing at the base. As a result of the crash, the pilot was killed. The navigator saved himself with the ejector seat and was only slightly injured.
- On 7 August 2017, an AH-64 Apache attack helicopter crashed right at the Ramon Airbase while returning from an exercise and after reporting a technical fault. One pilot was killed and the other seriously injured. As a result, all IAF Apaches were grounded for almost two months. The reason for the crash was determined to be the failure of a control joystick.
- On 10 February 2018, an F-16I Sufa of 201 Squadron "The One" was shot down by the Syrian air defenses after conducting an air raid on Iran-backed positions inside Syrian territory. The pilot and the navigator could eject and were injured. The jet crashed into a hillside near kibbutz Harduf in northern Israel, which lost its first warplane in 35 years by hostile action. An investigation revealed that the downing of the jet could have been avoided if the pilot had focused more on evading the incoming missile and not just on hitting his target or watching it being hit.
- During the Iranian attack on Israel in the night of 13–14 April 2024, four of nine ballistic missiles that overcame Israeli air defenses hit the airbase without causing any publicly known damage.

== See also ==
- List of airports in Israel
