= 420 Squadron (Israel) =

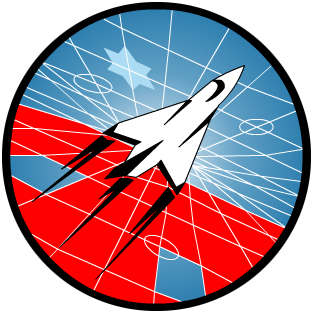
- Squadron logo
- Active: 2010 – Present
- Country: Israel
- Branch: Israeli Air Force
- Role: Air Defence
- Garrison/HQ: Hatzor Airbase
- Nickname(s): Fighter Aircraft Simulator

Aircraft flown
- Fighter: F-15A/B/C/D, F-15I, F-16C/D, F-16I

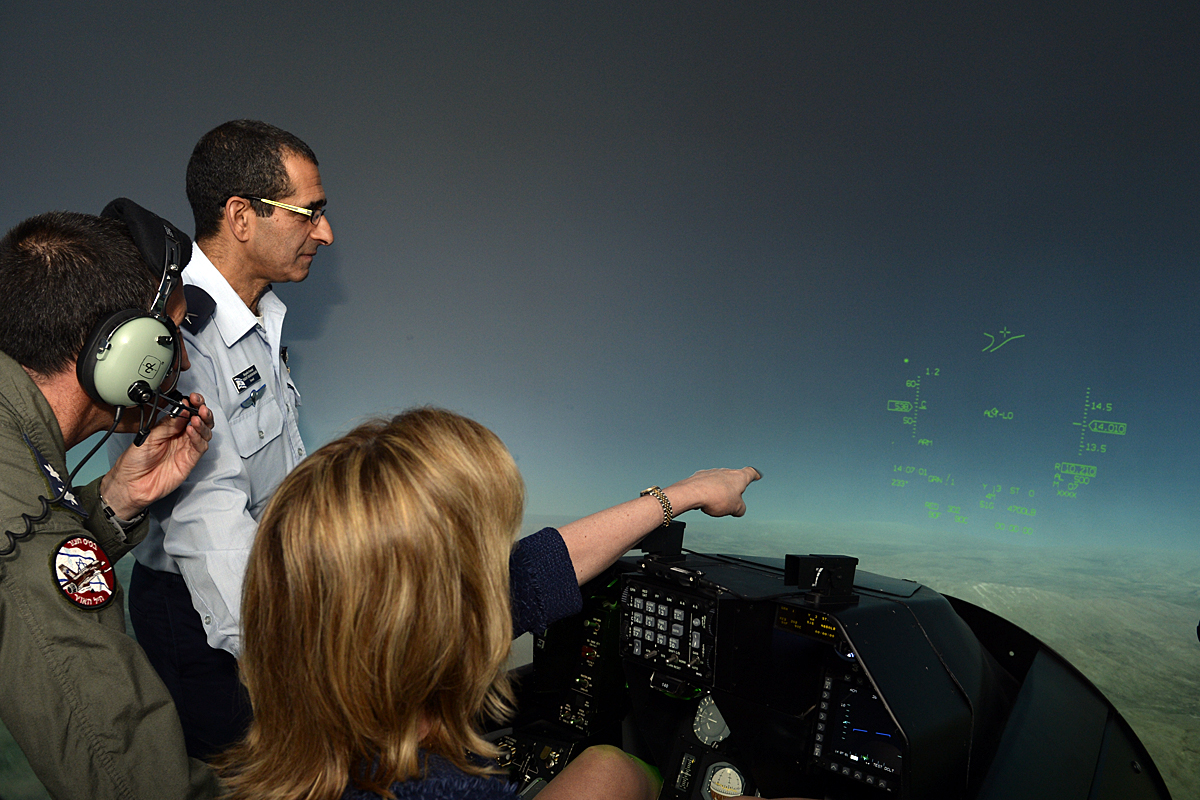
Deborah Lee James, then USAF chief, has a flight simulator at Hatzor explained to her in 2015

420 Squadron or "Fighter Aircraft Simulator Squadron" is a training unit in the Israeli Air Force (IAF), which operates flight simulators of combat aircraft as a network. The squadron was inaugurated in 2010 and is stationed at Hatzor Airbase.

== Description ==
The squadron includes trainers who simulate emergency situations for F-15A/B/C/D Eagle Baz, F-15I Ra'am, F-16C/D Barak and F-16I Sufa jets. In addition, there is a tactical trainer in the squadron called "Air Weapons Training Center".

In 2013, the mission training center (known as "Mal") was opened, which is able to simulate a mission and the flight of an entire structure in the air (four planes).

The trainers (the "simulators") are used to train aircrew members of the corps in various aspects of flight and air warfare and help maintain operational competence, at lower costs than the costs of flying a real aircraft. Also, there is a tactical simulator in the squadron, which enables joint training for pilots and flight controllers, which will start operating in about three years at the Hazor base. The new trainer also enables training of aircraft in a variety of structures and tasks.
