= Hatzor Airbase =

Air base in Hatzor, Israel

Hatzor Israeli Air Force Base Air Wing 4
- בָּסִיס חֵיל-הַאֲוִויר חָצוֹר
- Hatzor, Southern District in Israel
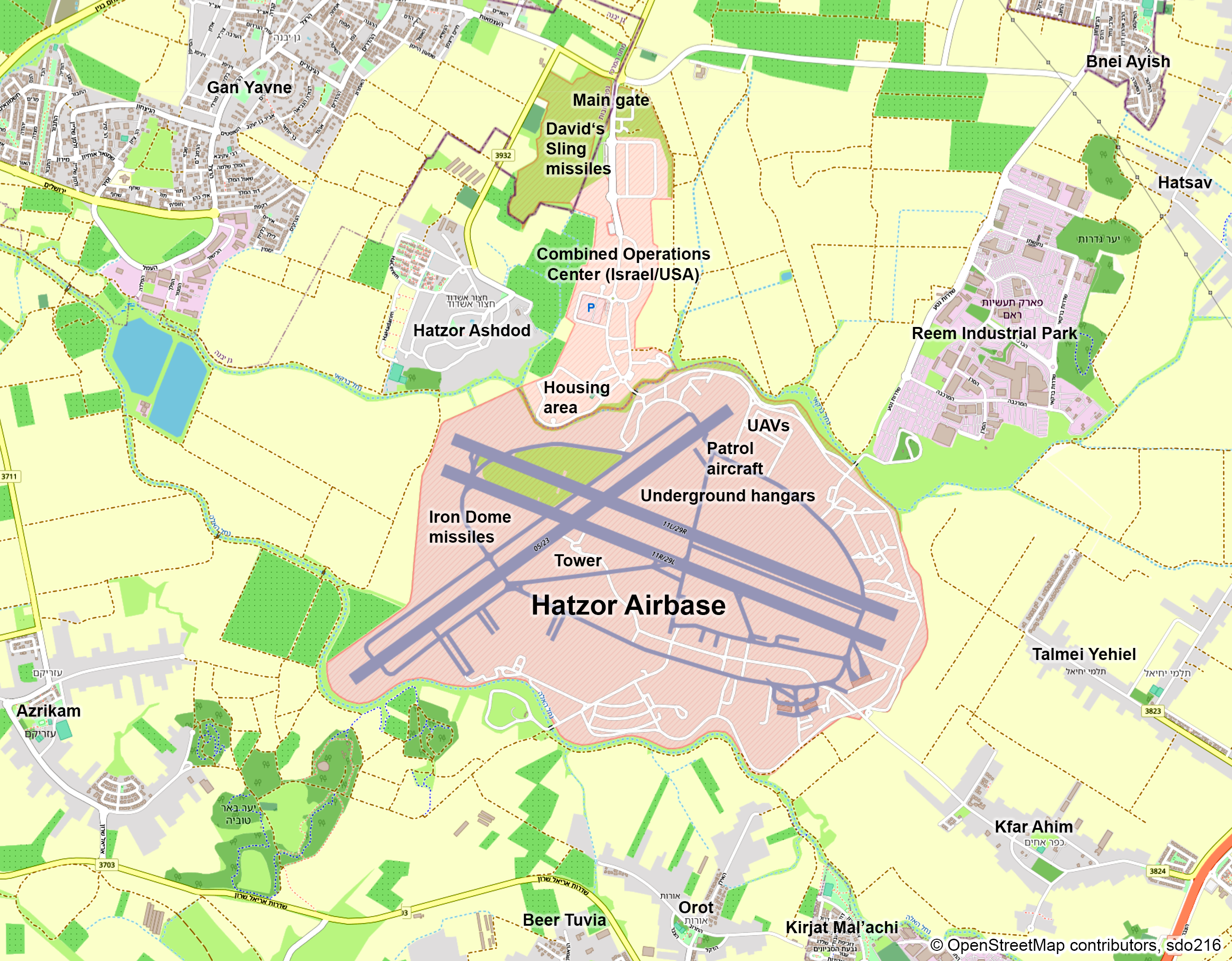

Site information
- Type: Airbase
- Owner: Israel Defense Forces
- Operator: Israeli Air Force

Location
- Shown within Israel Hatzor Airbase (Israel)
- Coordinates: 31°45′45.00″N 34°43′38.00″E

Site history
- Built: 1942 RAF / 1948 IAF
- In use: 1942 – present

Airfield information
- Identifiers: ICAO: LLHS
- Elevation: 45 metres (148 ft) AMSL
Runways
Direction	Length and surface
05/23	2,409 metres (7,904 ft) Asphalt
11R/29L	2,451 metres (8,041 ft) Asphalt
11L/29R	2,440 metres (8,005 ft) Asphalt

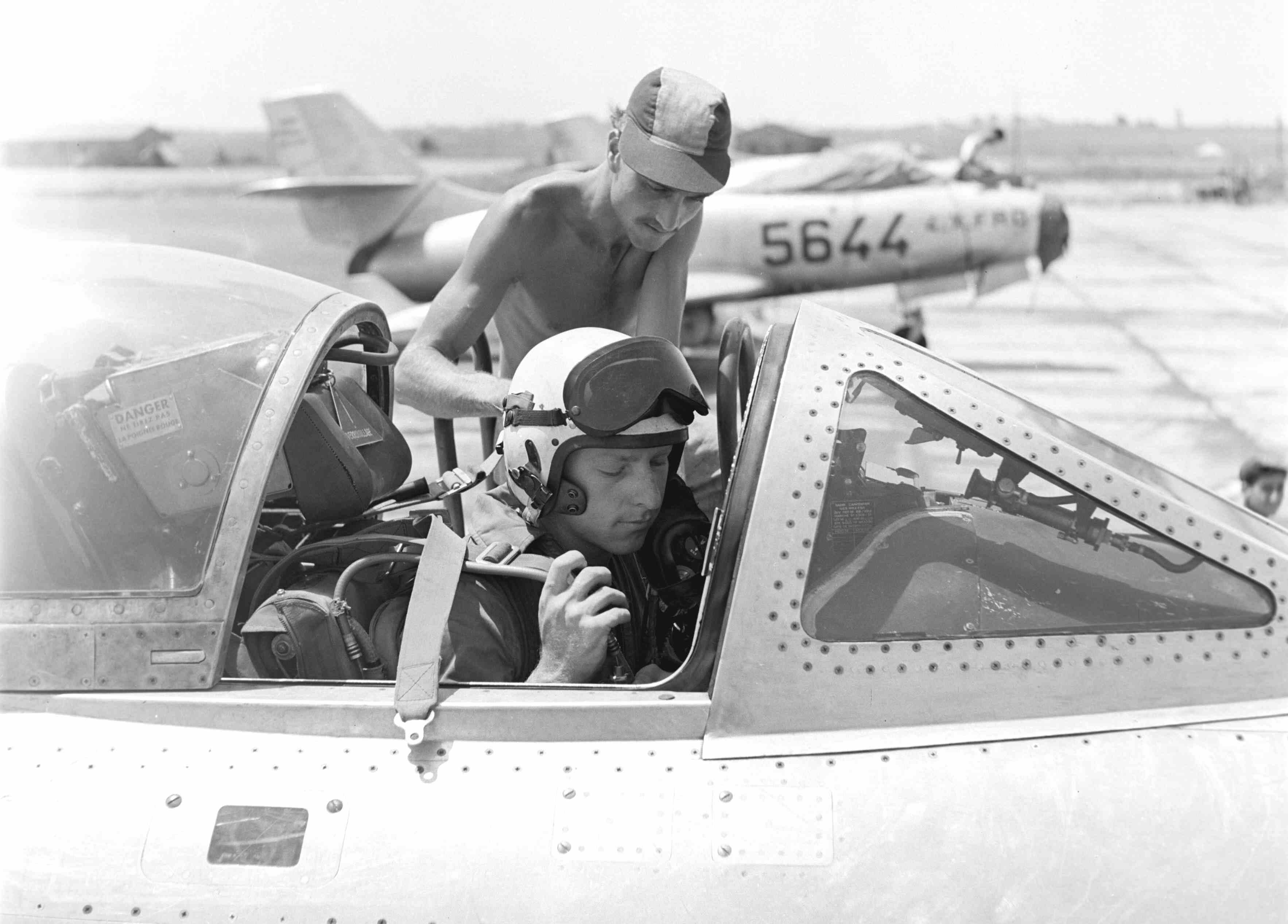
Israeli fighter pilot Amos Lapidot, later commander of the IAF, prepares for a mission in a Dassault Ouragan jet at Hatzor Airbase in July 1956.

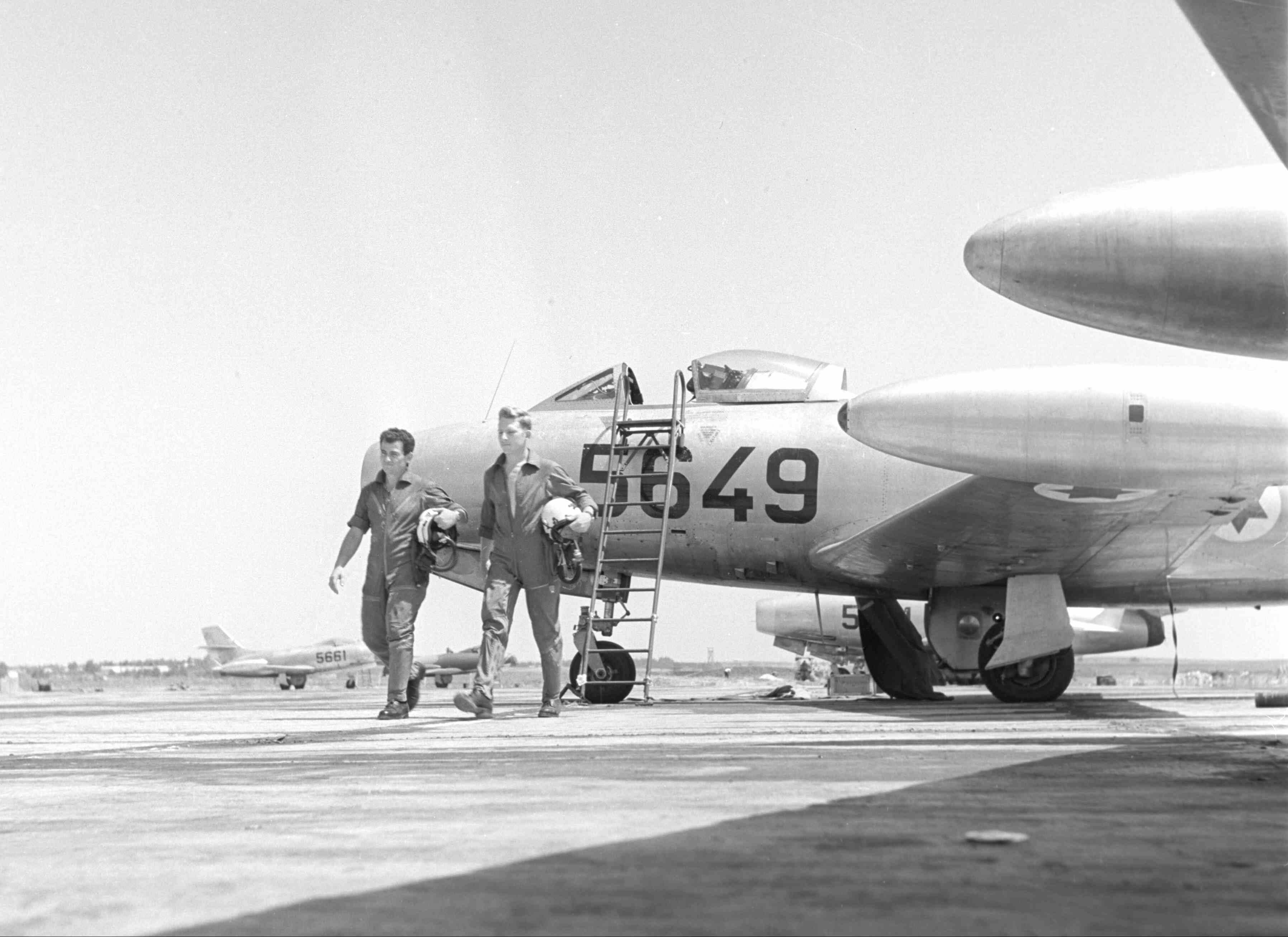
Amos Lapidot (right) and another Israeli fighter pilot after getting out of their Dassault Ouragan jets at Hatzor in July 1956

Hatzor Airbase (Hebrew: בָּסִיס חֵיל-הַאֲוִויר חָצוֹר) (ICAO: LLHS), also titled Kanaf 4 (lit. Wing 4) is an Israeli Air Force (IAF) base, located in central Israel (but in the Southern District) near kibbutz Hatzor Ashdod after which it is named. It has three runways, each just under 2.5 kilometers long. However, there have been no fighter jets stationed there since 2021, only patrol aircraft, UAVs and defense missiles. A Combined Operations Center for the US military and Israel has also been built there in 2021.

== History ==
=== RAF Qastina ===
The airbase was opened in 1942 as RAF Qastina by the Royal Air Force of the United Kingdom in the then British Protectorate of Palestine. It was named after the Palestinian village Qastina southeast of it, that perished in the 1948 Palestine War, and the nearby British military base Camp Qastina. Two British squadrons, operating Dakota and Halifax aircraft, were initially stationed at the airbase.

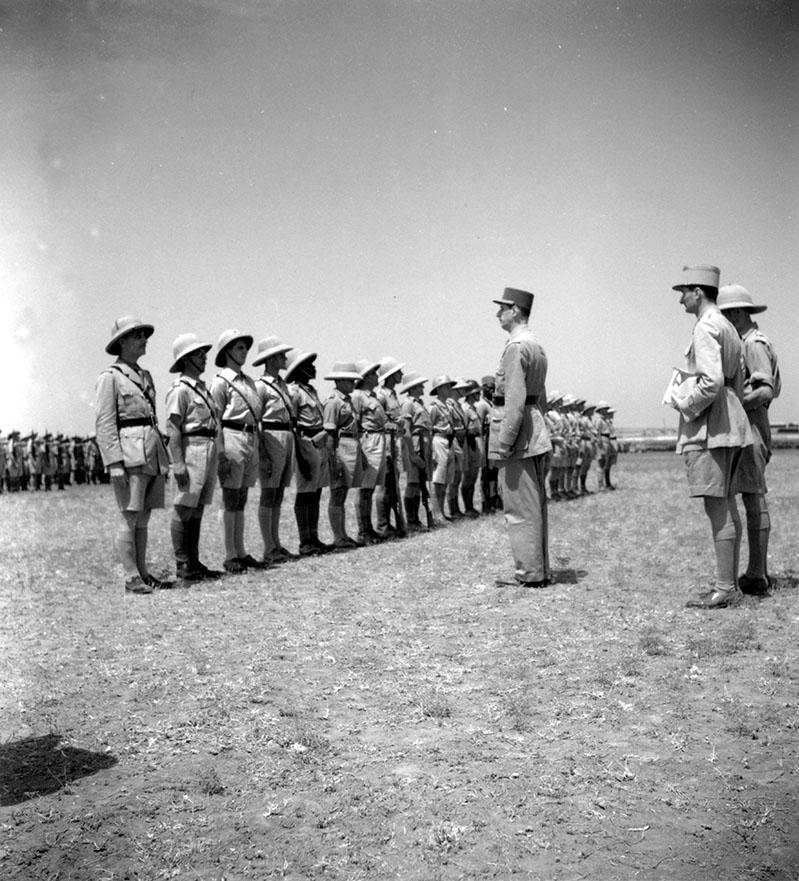
The French general Charles de Gaulle (tall man in the middle) visiting Camp Qastina in May 1941

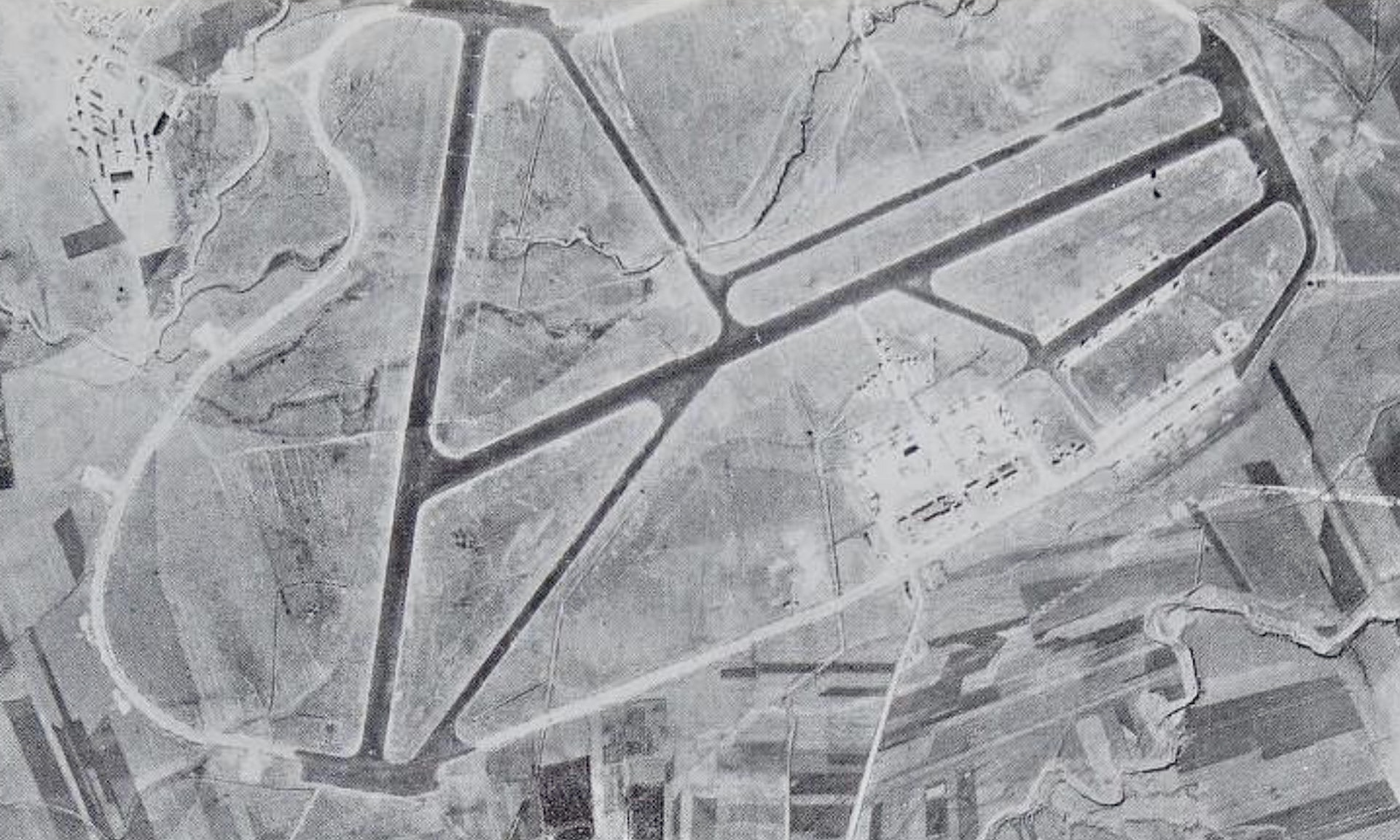
An aerial photograph of the British airbase RAF Qastina from the 1940s

==== Operational units from 1945 to 1948 ====
Some RAF Units stationed at RAF Qastina:

- No. 512 Squadron RAF between 8 and 24 October 1945 with the Douglas Dakota
- No. 644 Squadron RAF between 1 December 1945 and 1 September 1946 with Handley Page Halifax A.7 & A.9 became No. 47 Squadron RAF between 1 and 30 September 1946 with Handley Page Halifax A.7 & A.9
- No. 651 Squadron RAF between 1 June 1947 and 11 February 1948 with the Auster AOP.6
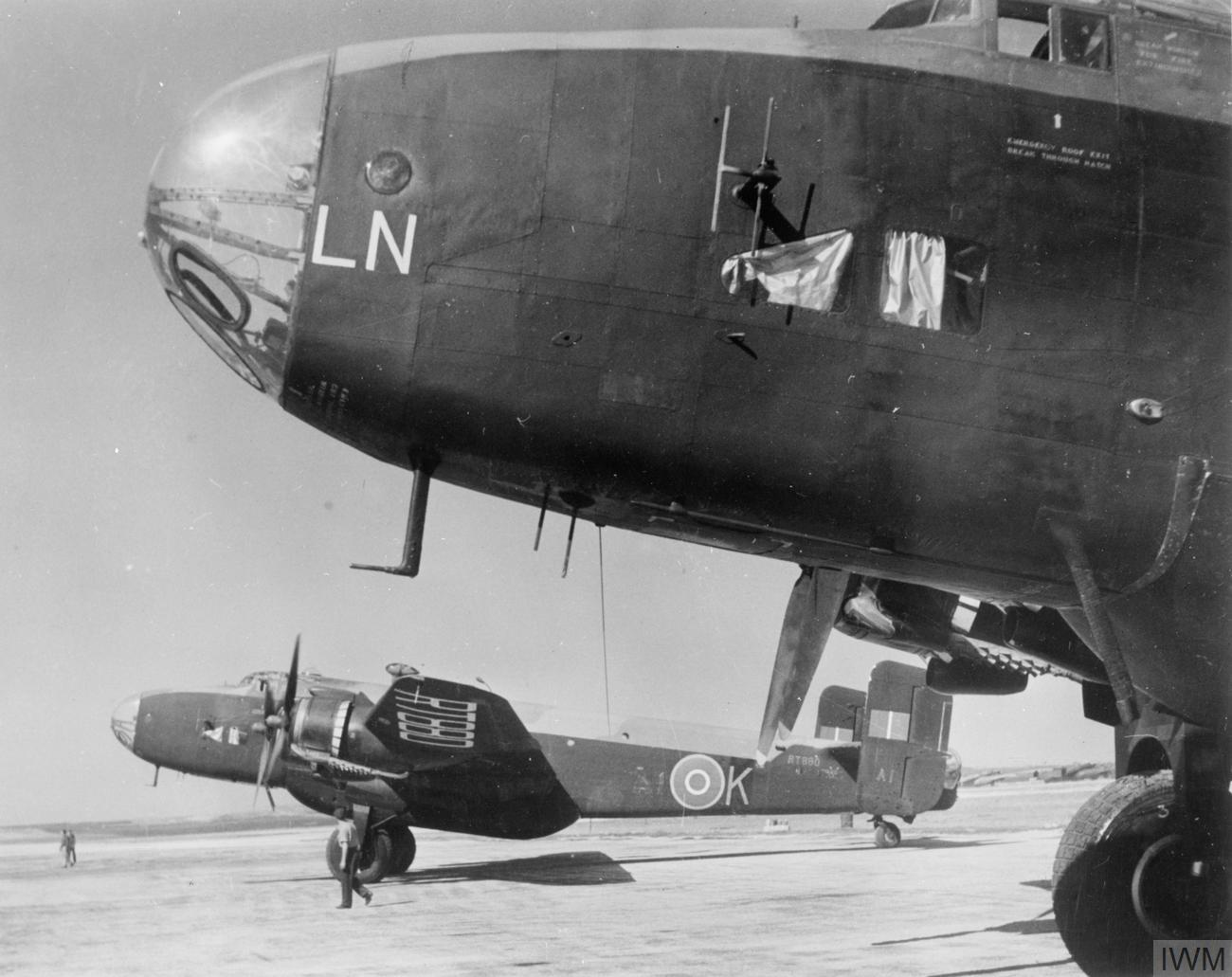
Handley Page Halifax bombers at the neighboring airbase RAF Aqir, used as transport aircraft after WWII in 1946

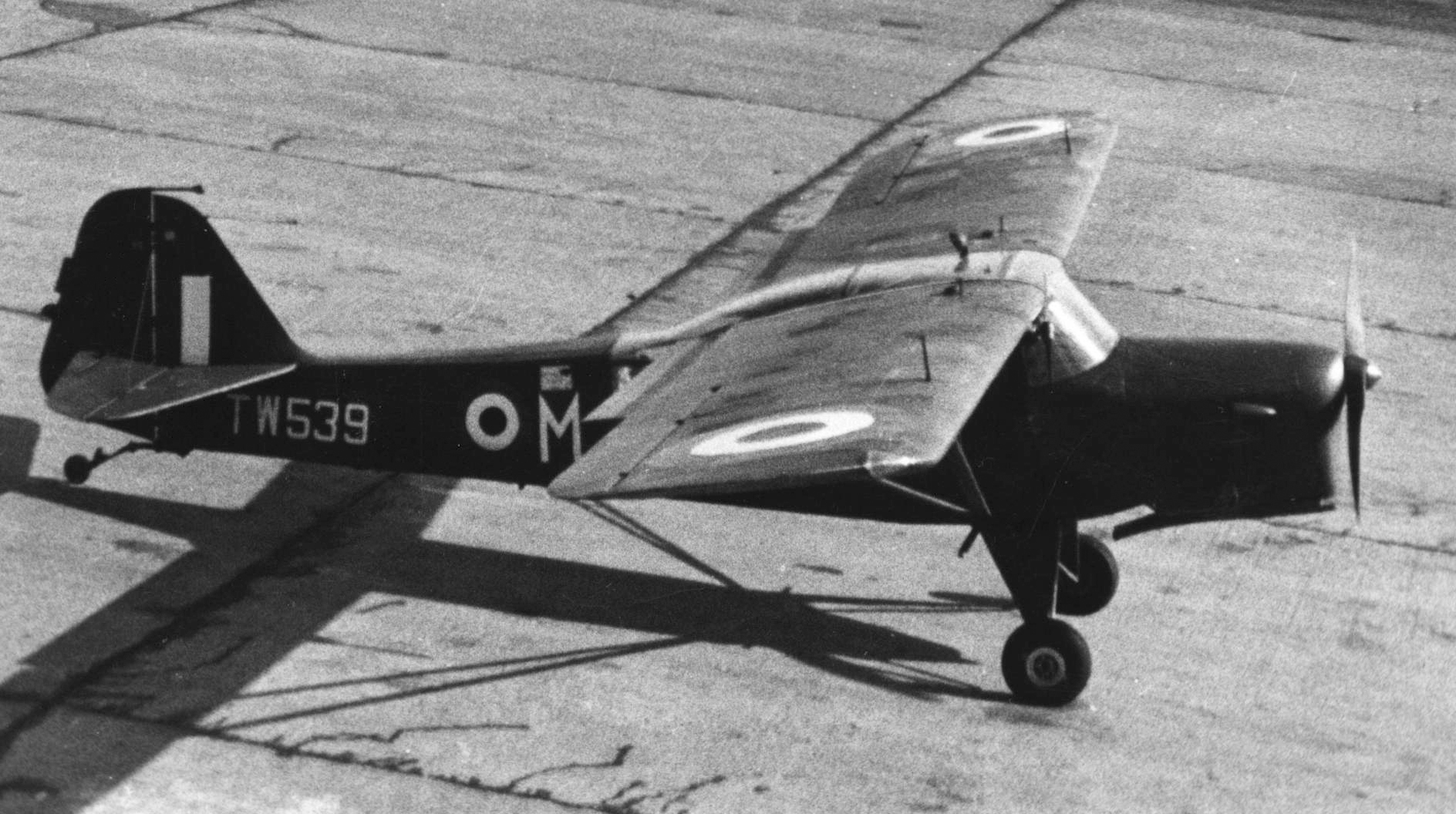
An Auster AOP.6 observation aircraft of a different squadron in 1954

==== Night of the Airplanes ====
On the night of 25 February 1946, Irgun militants attacked the airfield and destroyed several parked RAF Handley Page Halifax bombers used as transport aircraft (see photo above). Two additional RAF airfields, RAF Lydda (nowadays Ben Gurion International Airport) and RAF Sirkin, were attacked in what became known as the "Night of the Airplanes". Altogether, the attacks destroyed 20 RAF aircraft and damaged several others. Following these attacks, the RAF relocated many aircraft to bases in Egypt.

=== Israeli Air Force Base Hatzor ===
On 15 March 1948, as the British Mandate for Palestine drew to a close, the RAF evacuated the airfield and it was taken over by Haganah forces of the newly founded State of Israel and renamed Hatzor Airbase after the nearby kibbutz Hatzor Ashdod (see map at the top).

=== Formerly stationed aircraft squadrons ===
==== 101 Squadron "First Fighter" ====

The 101 Squadron "First Fighter" was founded in May 1948 at Ekron Airbase (now Tel Nof) as the first military aircraft squadron in Israel and relocated to Hatzor in November – at that time still with Avia S-199 fighter aircraft, made from leftover parts of the Messerschmitt Bf 109. A total of 25 of these were imported from Czechoslovakia, where German aircraft had been manufactured in the Avia factories during World War II. It was followed by the Supermarine Spitfire together with the North American P-51 Mustang. During this time the squadron was stationed at Ramat David Airbase.

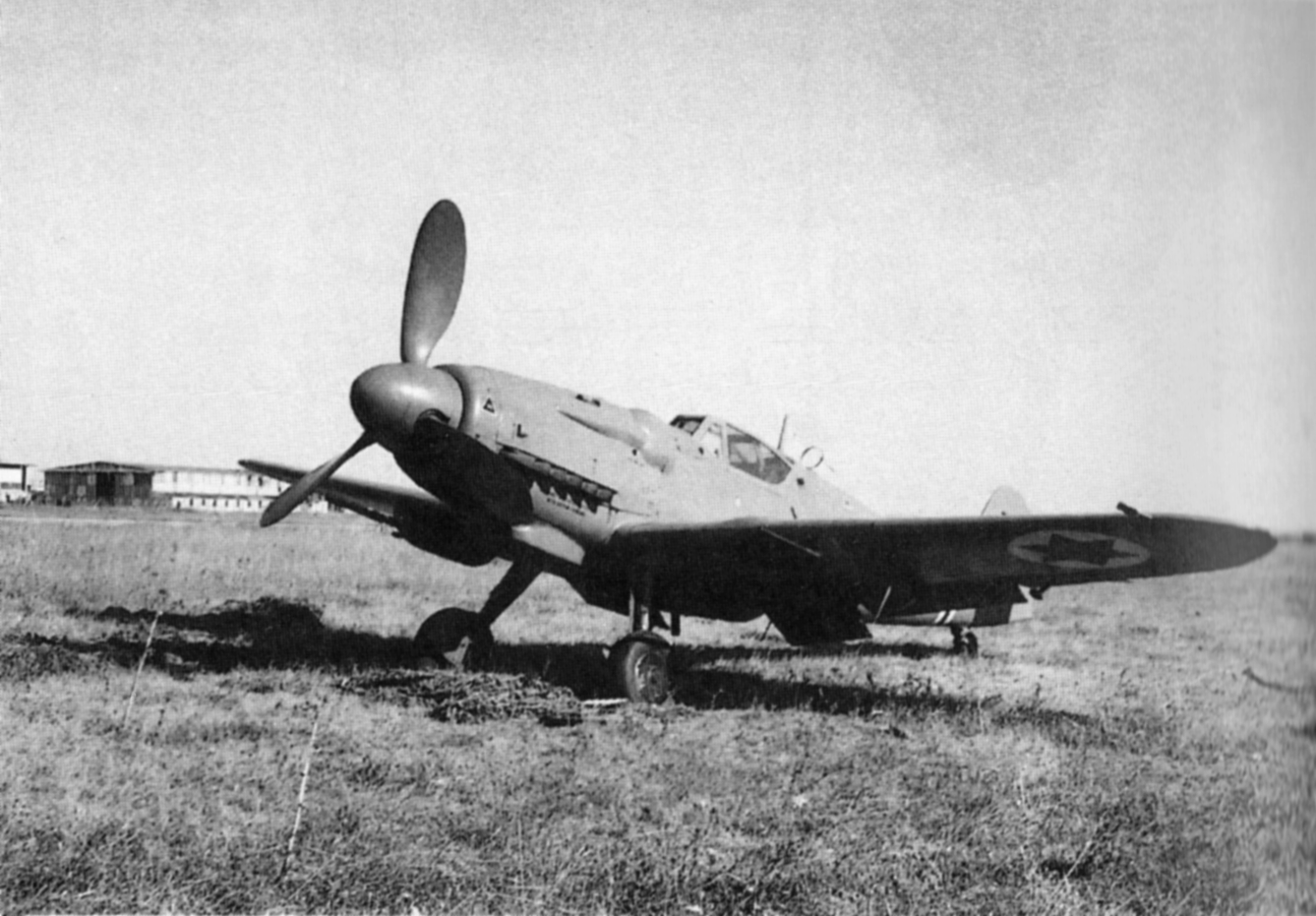
Czechoslovak Avia S-199 of the Israeli 101 Squadron "First Fighter" in June 1948

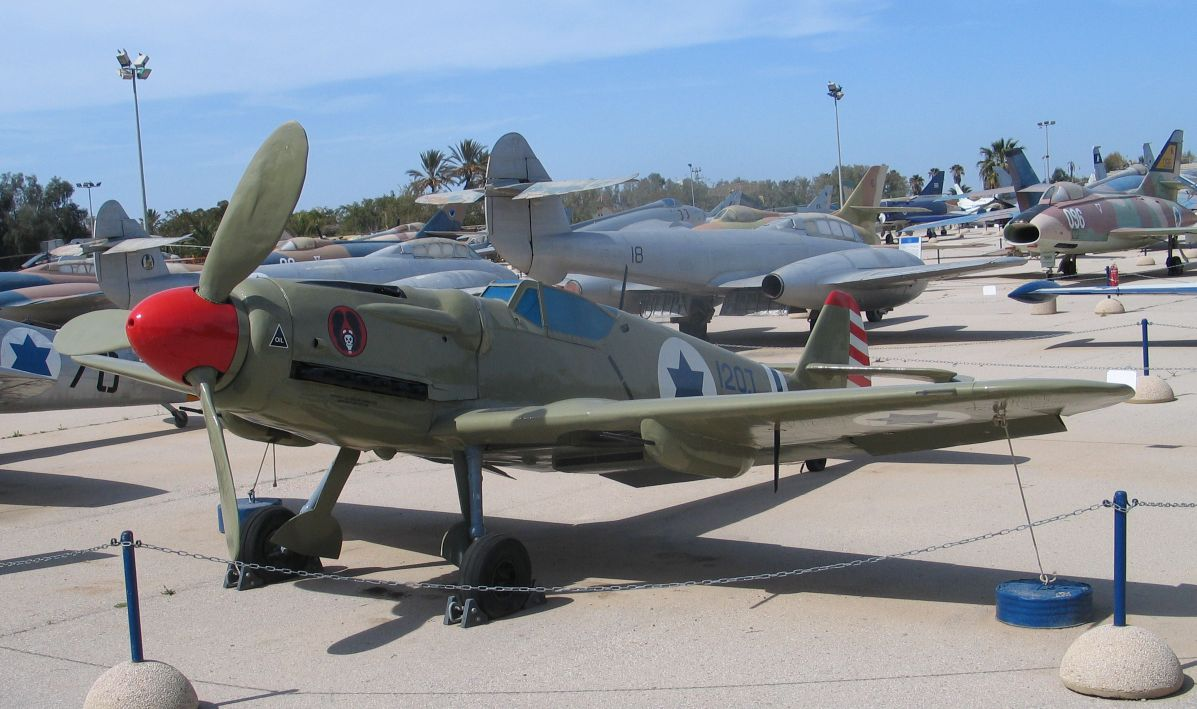
An Avia S-199 of 101 Squadron "First Fighter" at Hatzor, now at the IAF Museum near Hatzerim Airbase

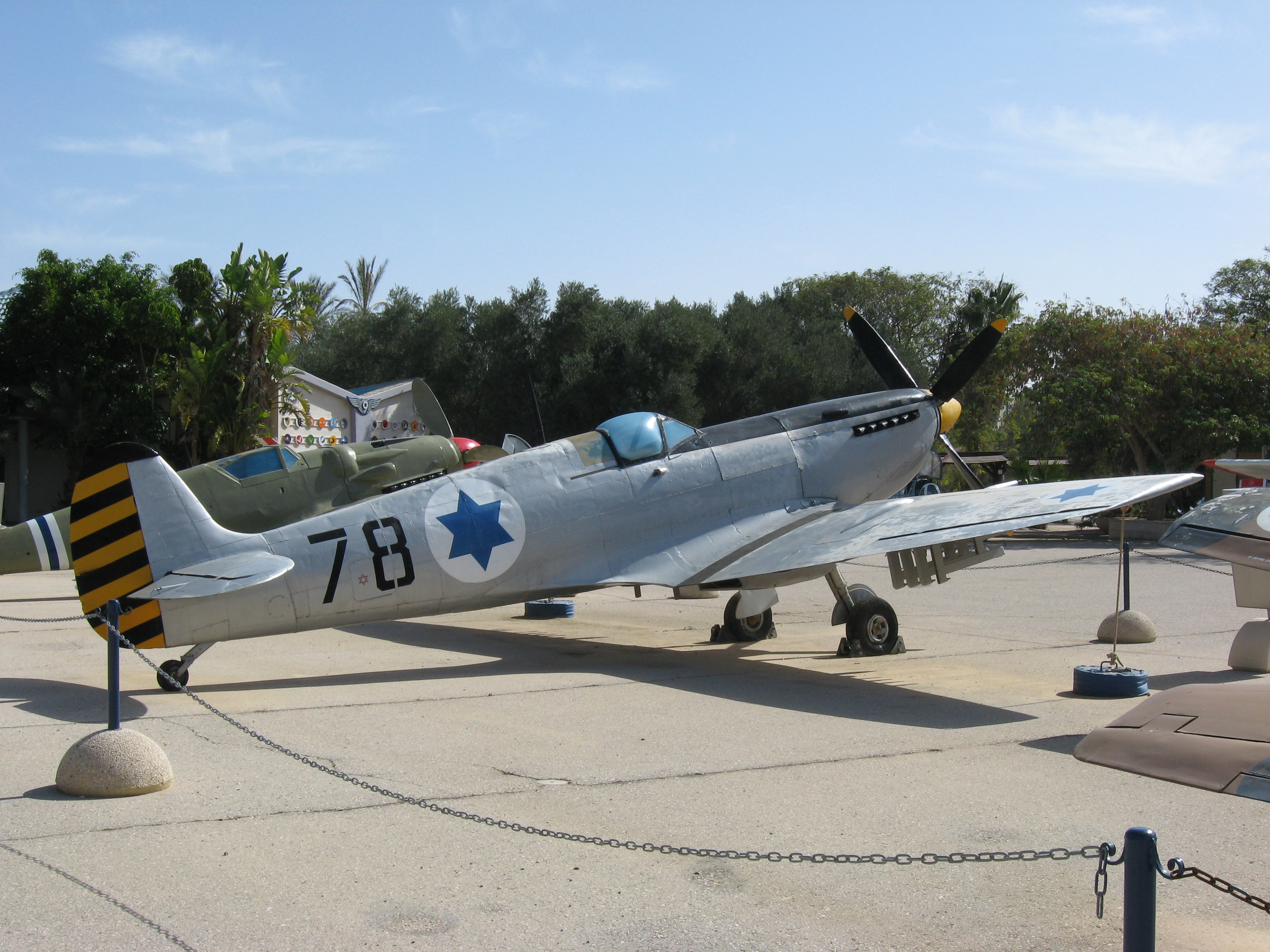
A Spitfire Mk.IXe of 101 Squadron "First Fighter" from the early days of the IAF at the IAF Museum

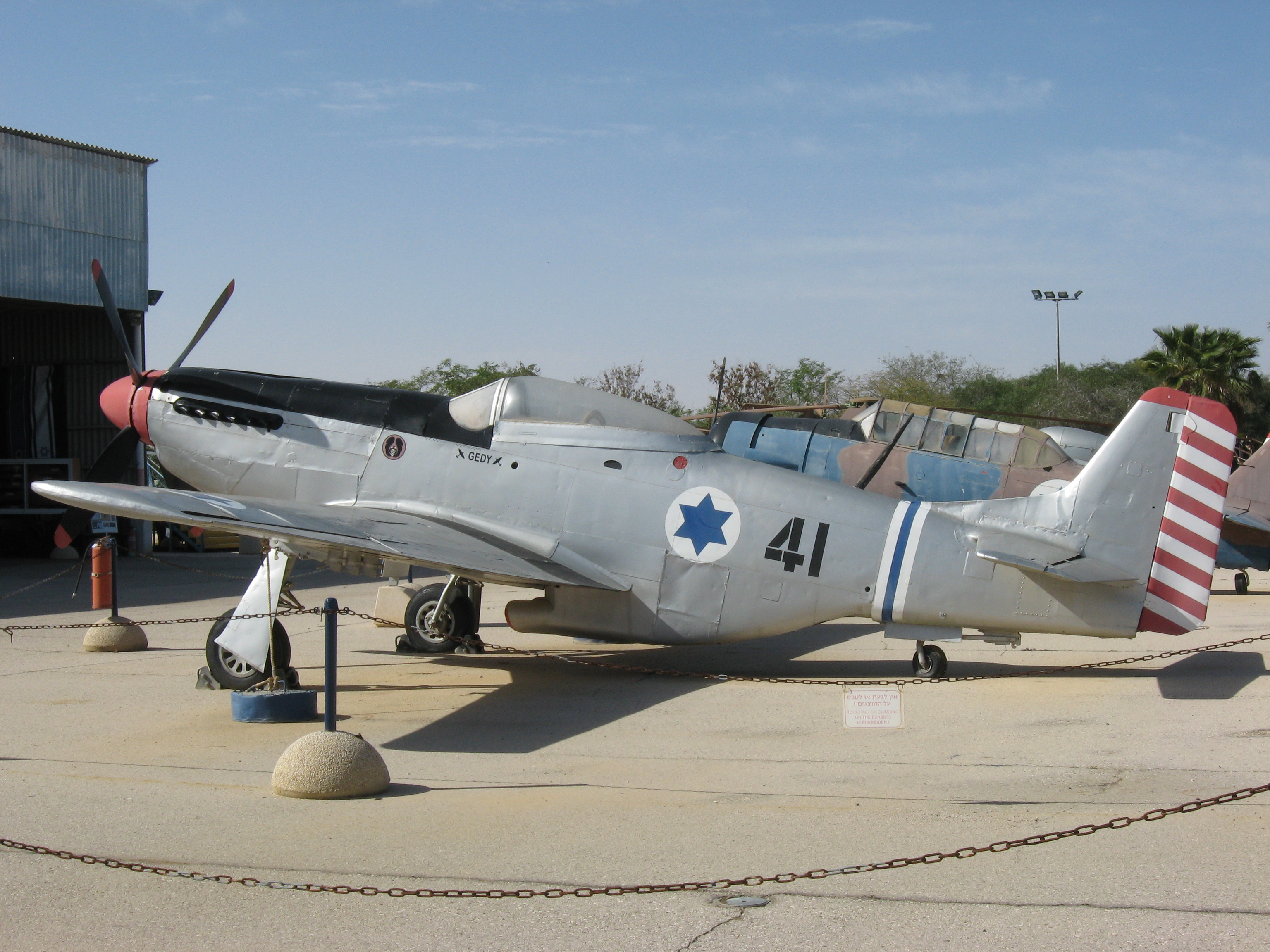
A P-51D Mustang of 101 Squadron "First Fighter" at the IAF Museum near Hatzerim Airbase

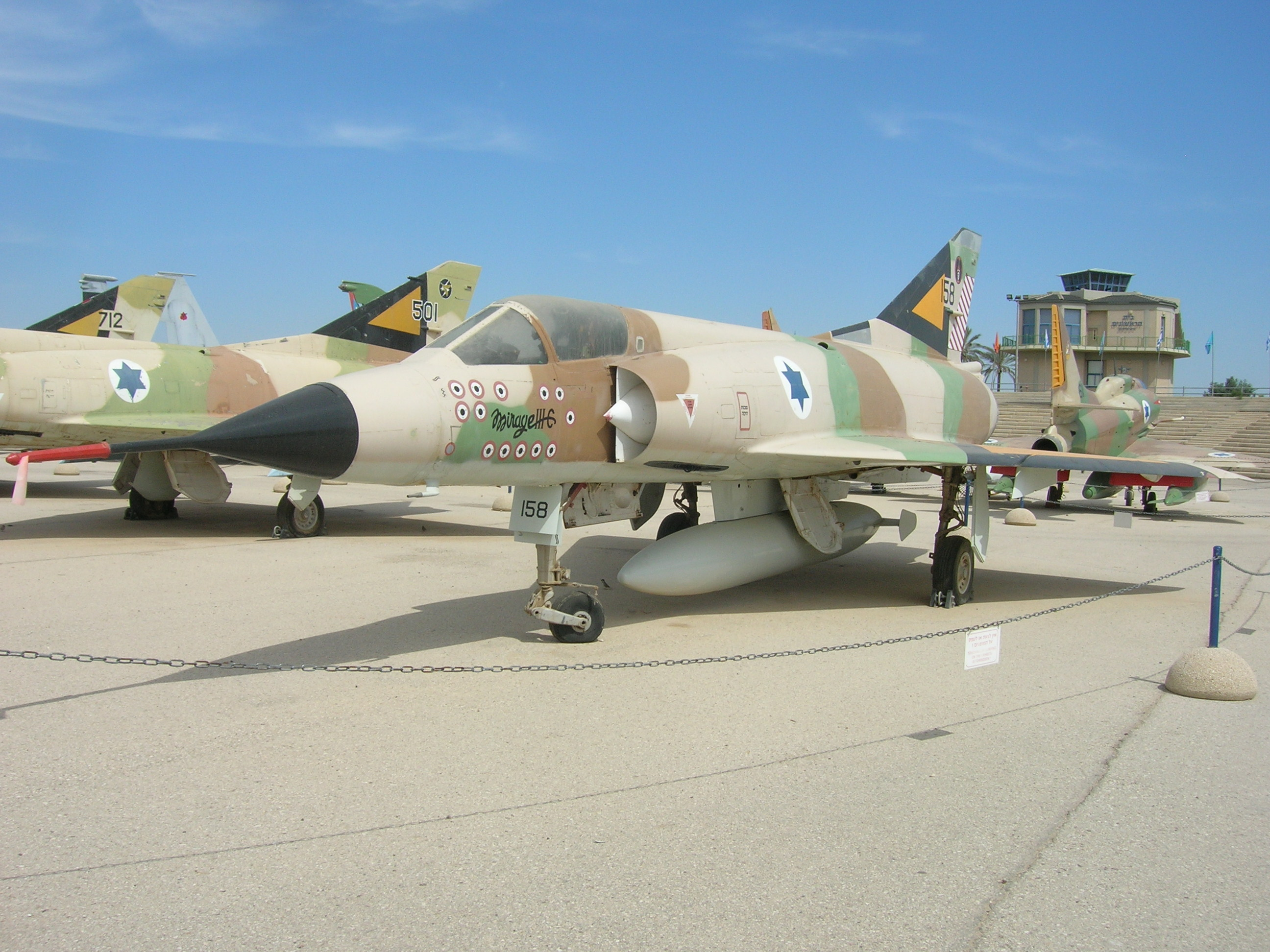
The famous Dassault Mirage IIICJ Shahak "#158" of 101 Squadron "First Fighter" of Hatzor with 13 "Kill Markings" at the IAF Museum near Hatzerim Airbase

In April 1956 the 101 Squadron was back at Hatzor Airbase and got its first jets with the Dassault Mystère IV A (see: Operation Shacharit) and then in 1962 with the Dassault Mirage IIICJ Shahak (see picture on the right), which were used very successfully during the Six-Day War, the War of Attrition and the Yom Kippur War. From 1971 and 1976 respectively, the IAI Nesher (griffon vulture) and the improved IAI Kfir (young lion) – built in Israel and based on the Dassault Mirage 5 – were handed over to the squadron as additional jets. From 1987 onwards it flew the F-16C/D Barak and had been involved in numerous missions since its inception.

==== 105 Squadron "Scorpion" ====
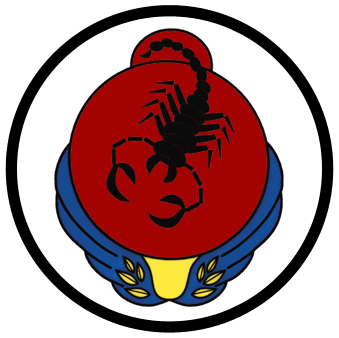

In August 1950 at Ramat David Airbase, a group was established within the 101 Squadron to train pilots to attack ground targets. This group was nicknamed "Scorpion" and soon became the 105 Squadron. It initially flew the English Spitfire and later the US P-51 Mustang. In 1958, it moved to Chazor and was the only squadron in Israel to fly the new Super Mystère B2 (SMB2) Sambad. These jets were eventually upgraded by IAI under the name Saar and flew until the end of the 1970s – most recently in other squadrons. From 1975, the F-4E Phantom II Kurnas was introduced and from 1991 finally the F-16C/D Barak. It was also involved in numerous missions.

==== 109 Squadron "The Valley" ====

The 109 Squadron "The Valley" was founded in 1951 under a different name at Tel Nof Airbase and was relocated to Hatzor from 1952 to 1956, where it flew the de Havilland Mosquito purchased from the British as a fighter-bomber and reconnaissance aircraft (see gallery below). In 1956 the squadron took part in the fighting during the Suez Crisis. After that, its Mosquitos were decommissioned and the squadron transferred to Ramat David Airbase.

==== 113 Squadron "Hornet" ====
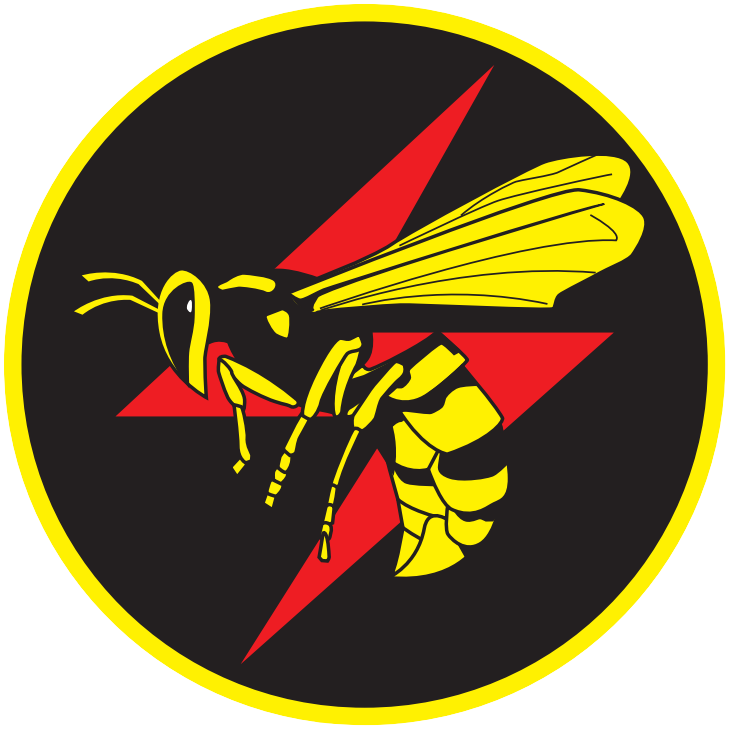

The 113 Squadron "Hornet" was established in 1955 at Hatzor as the second jet squadron of the IAF – after the 117 Squadron "First Jet" founded in 1953 at Ramat David. Initially it flew the Dassault Ouragan (Hurricane), from 1973 the IAI Nesher (griffon vulture) and from 1976 the improved IAI Kfir (young lion). In 1986 the 113 Squadron at Hatzor was closed and re-established in 1989/90 at Ramon Airbase with AH-64 Apache attack helicopters.

==== 116 Squadron "Lions Of The South" ====
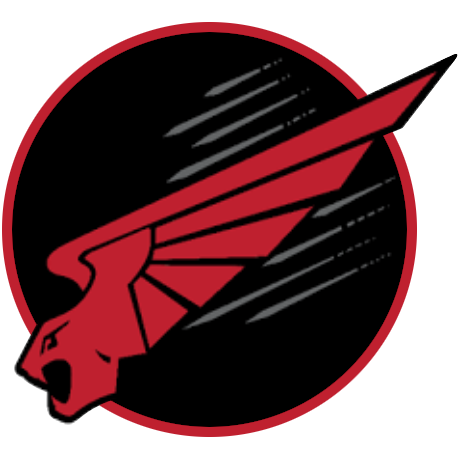

The 116 Squadron "Lions of the South" was established in 1956 at Tel Nof Airbase – initially under a different name – flying North American P-51 Mustang aircraft. In October 1961, it relocated to Hatzor and received Dassault Mystère IV A fighter jets from the 101 Squadron. The Mystère IVs were retired in 1971, and the squadron received Douglas A-4H Skyhawk jets, which were soon replaced by the newer A-4N model. In October 1983, it moved to the newly constructed Nevatim Airbase.

==== 201 Squadron "The One" ====
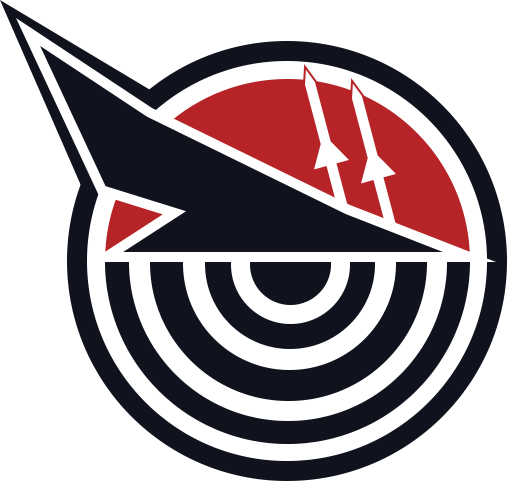

The 201 Squadron "The One" was established at Hatzor in September 1969 as the first of what would later be five F-4E Phantom II Kurnass squadrons. It then took part in the War of Attrition with Egypt and the Yom Kippur War, suffering heavy losses in the latter. In June 1988, the squadron and its Phantoms were relocated to Tel Nof Airbase, where they remained in service until 2004. In 2020, a restored F-4E Phantom II Kurnass was installed near the main gate of Ramon Airbase, and a memorial to the 201 Squadron was erected.

==== Gallery of formerly stationed aircraft ====
Most of the aircraft types are now at the IAF Museum adjacent to Hatzerim Airbase:

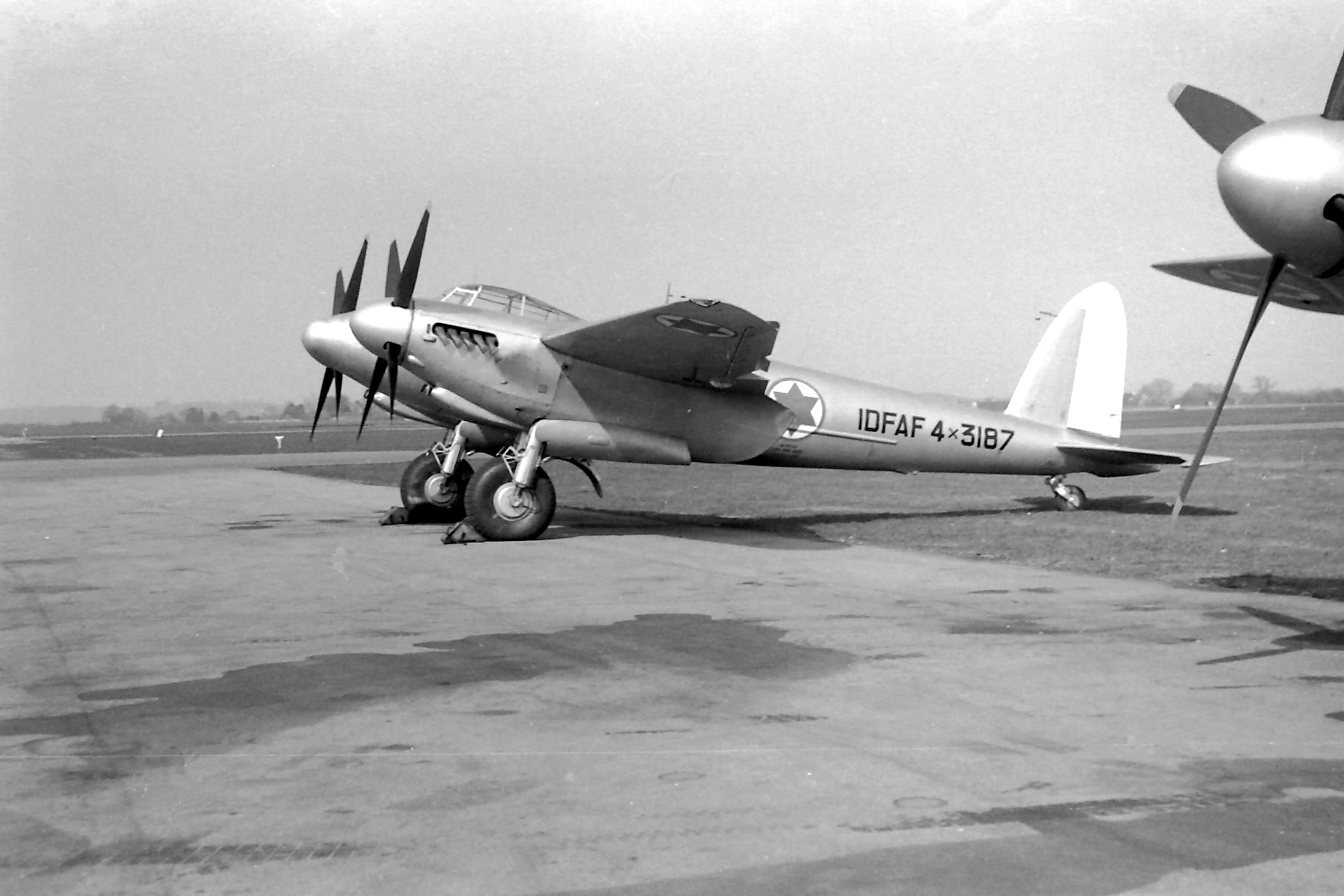
The de Havilland DH.98 Mosquito, here in 1955, was used as a bomber during the Suez Crisis (1956)

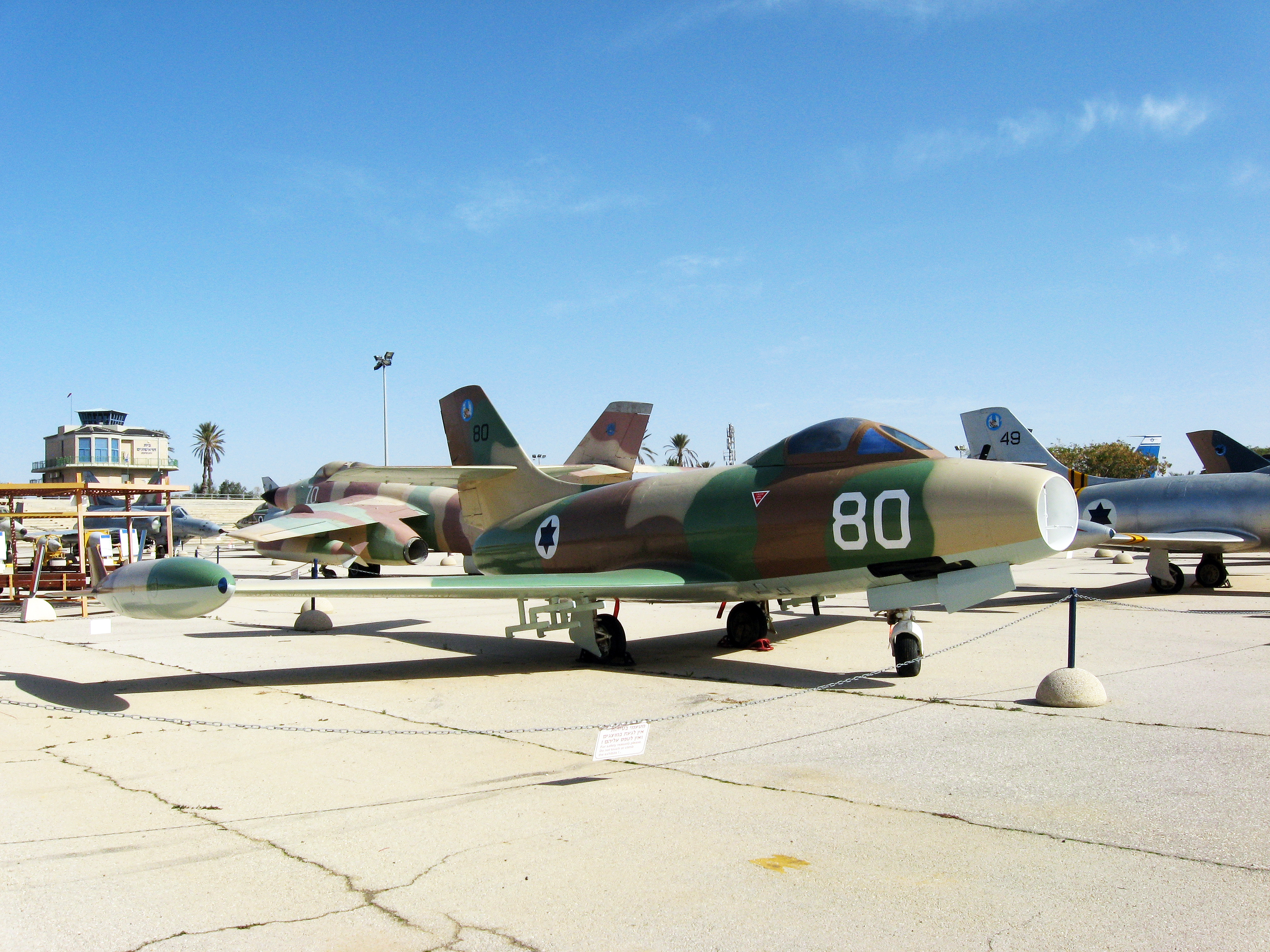
A Dassault Ouragan fighter jet, as it was stationed at Hatzor from 1955, at the IAF Museum near Hatzerim

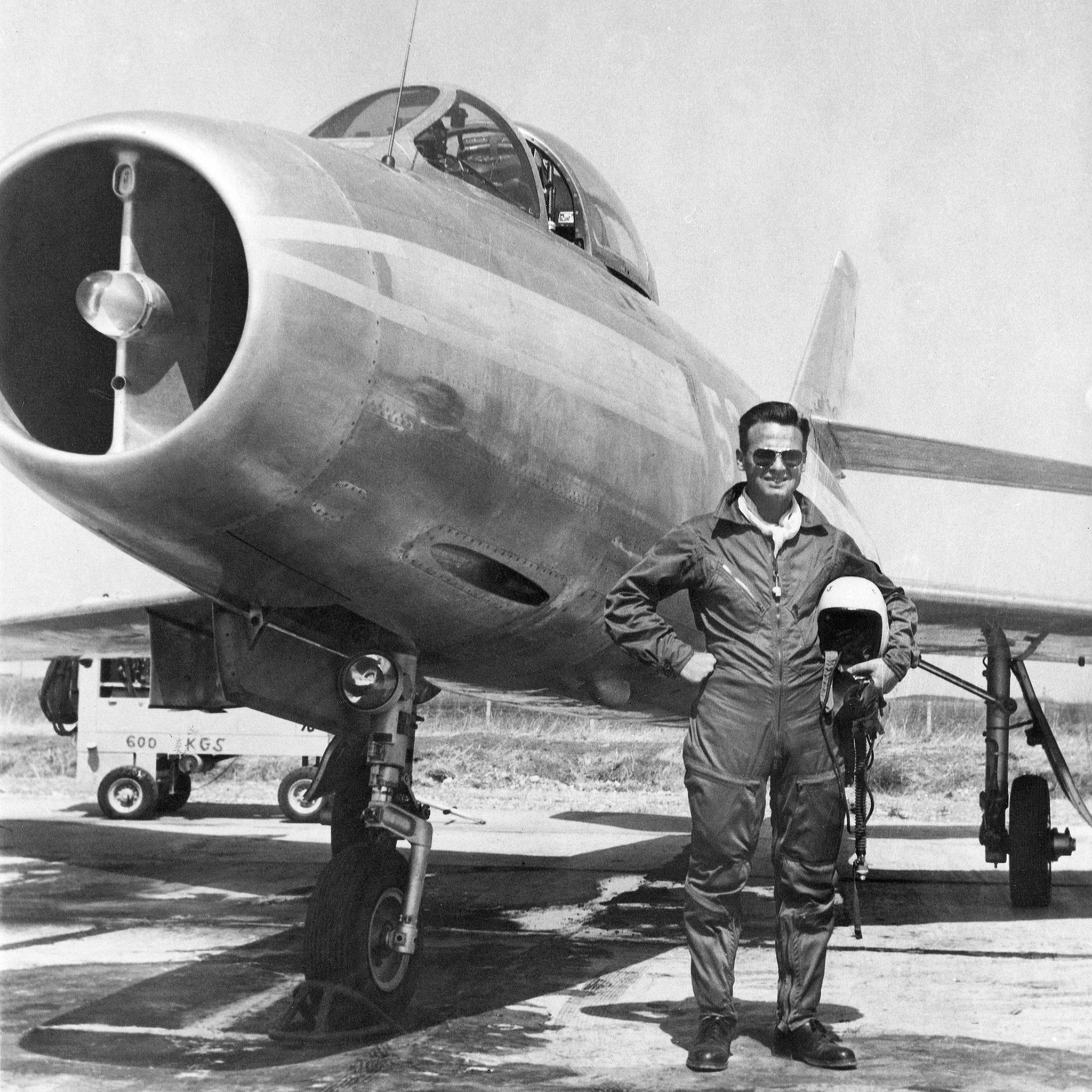
IAF chief test pilot Danny Shapira in front of a new Dassault Mystère IV A jet in June 1956 at Hatzor Airbase

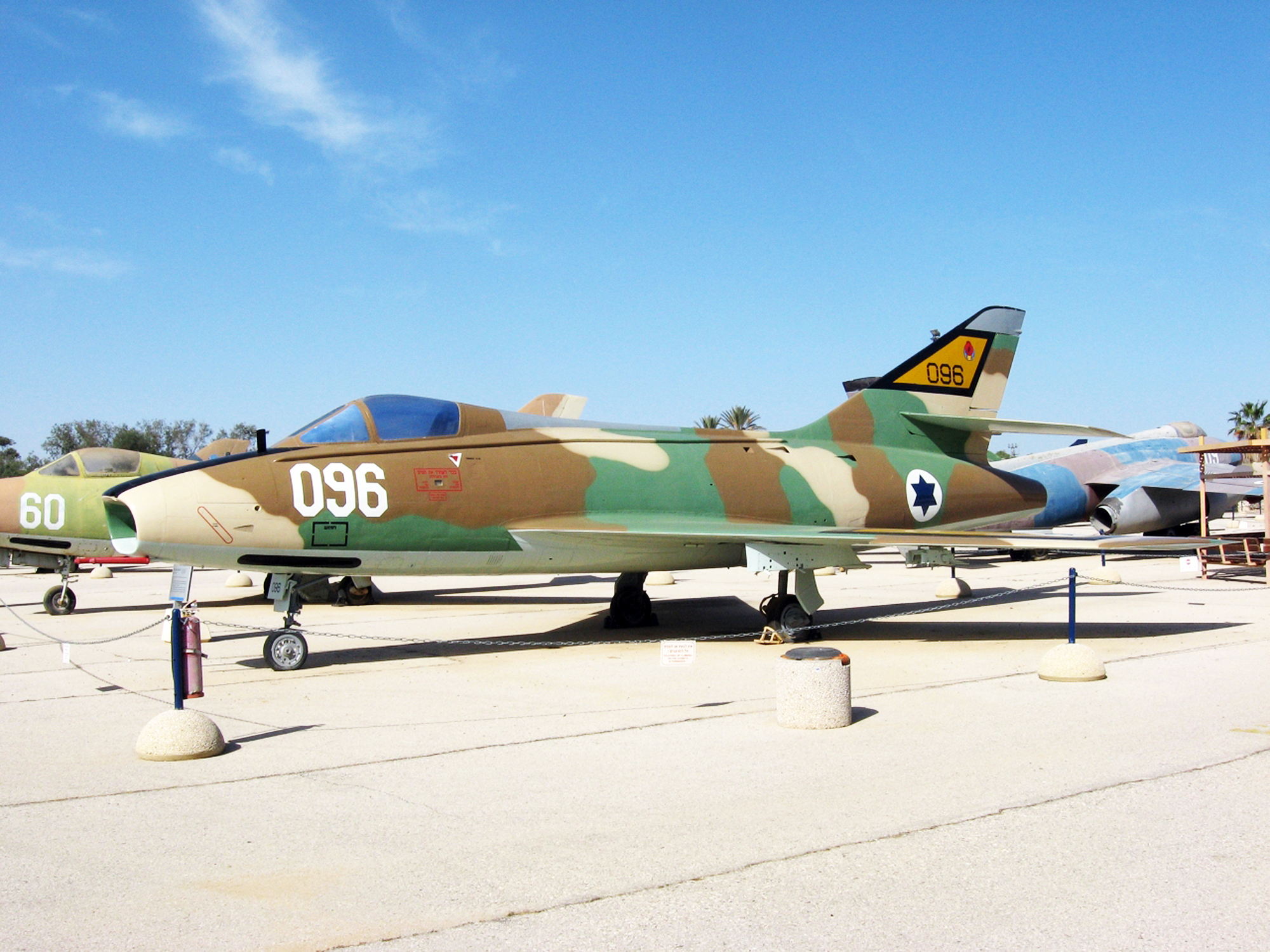
A Super Mystère B2 (SMB2) Saar of 105 Squadron "Scorpion" from 1958, at the IAF Museum near Hatzerim

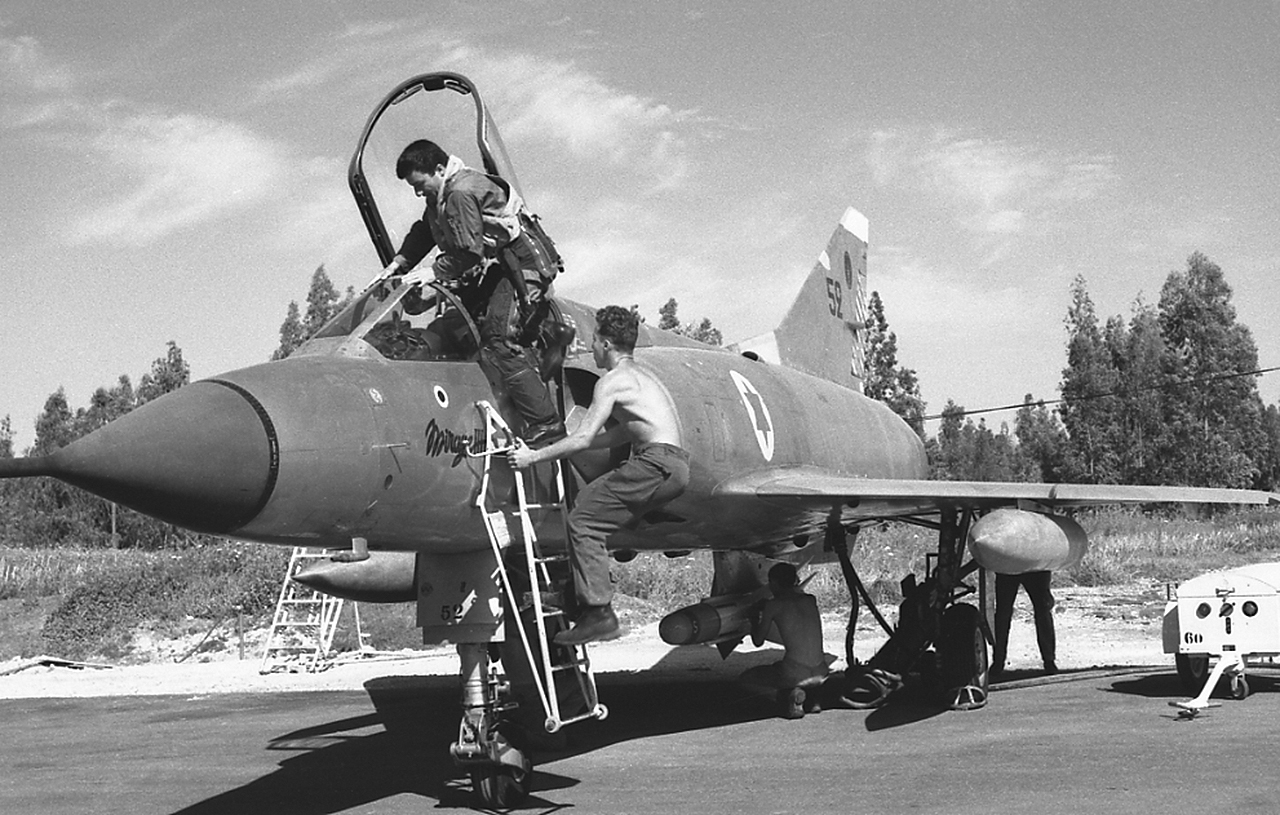
A Mirage IIICJ Shahak of 101 Squadron "First Fighter" is prepared for a mission in June 1967 at Hatzor

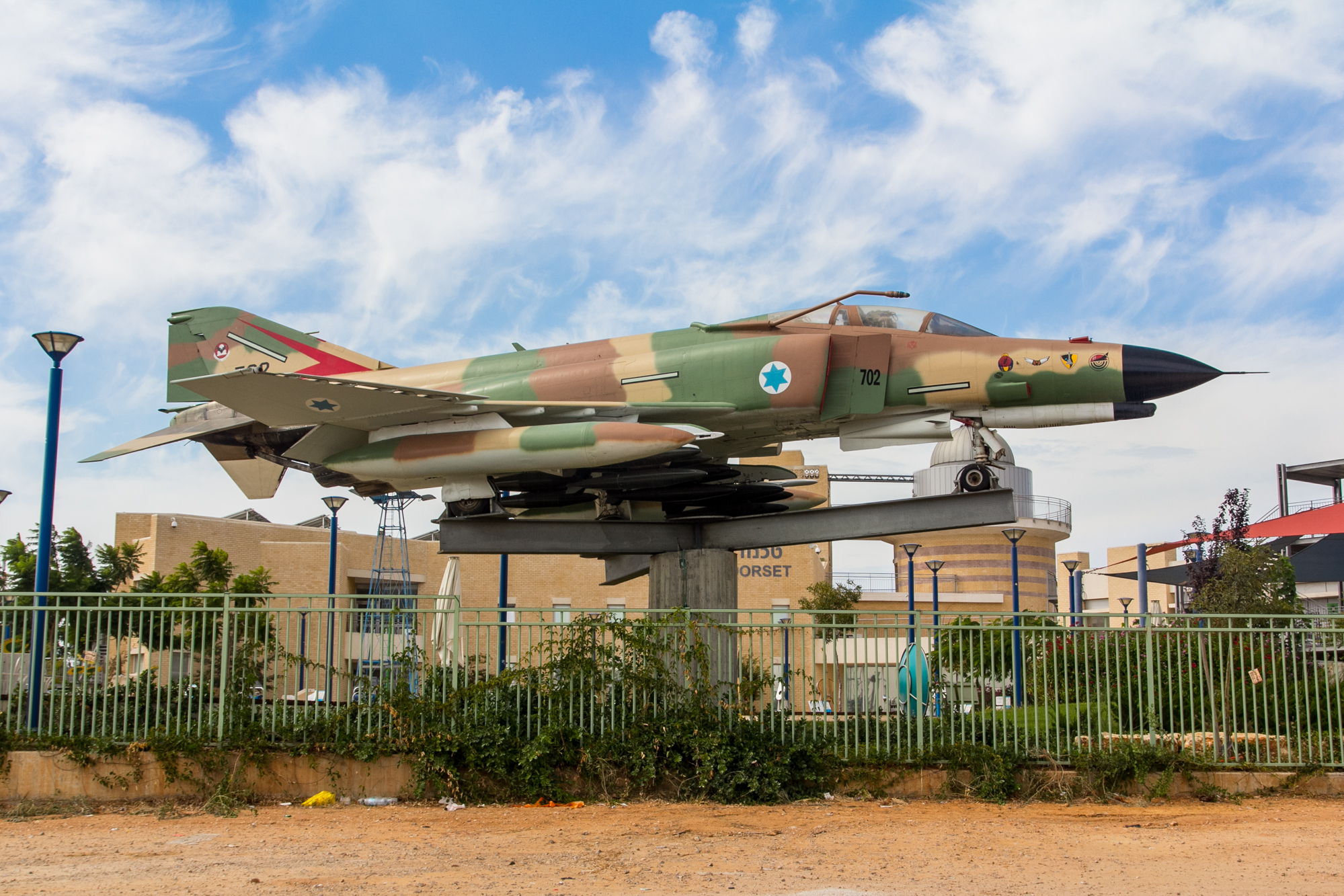
An F-4E Phantom II Kurnass, also of 201 Squadron "The One" from 1969, now at the Giv'at Olga Technoda

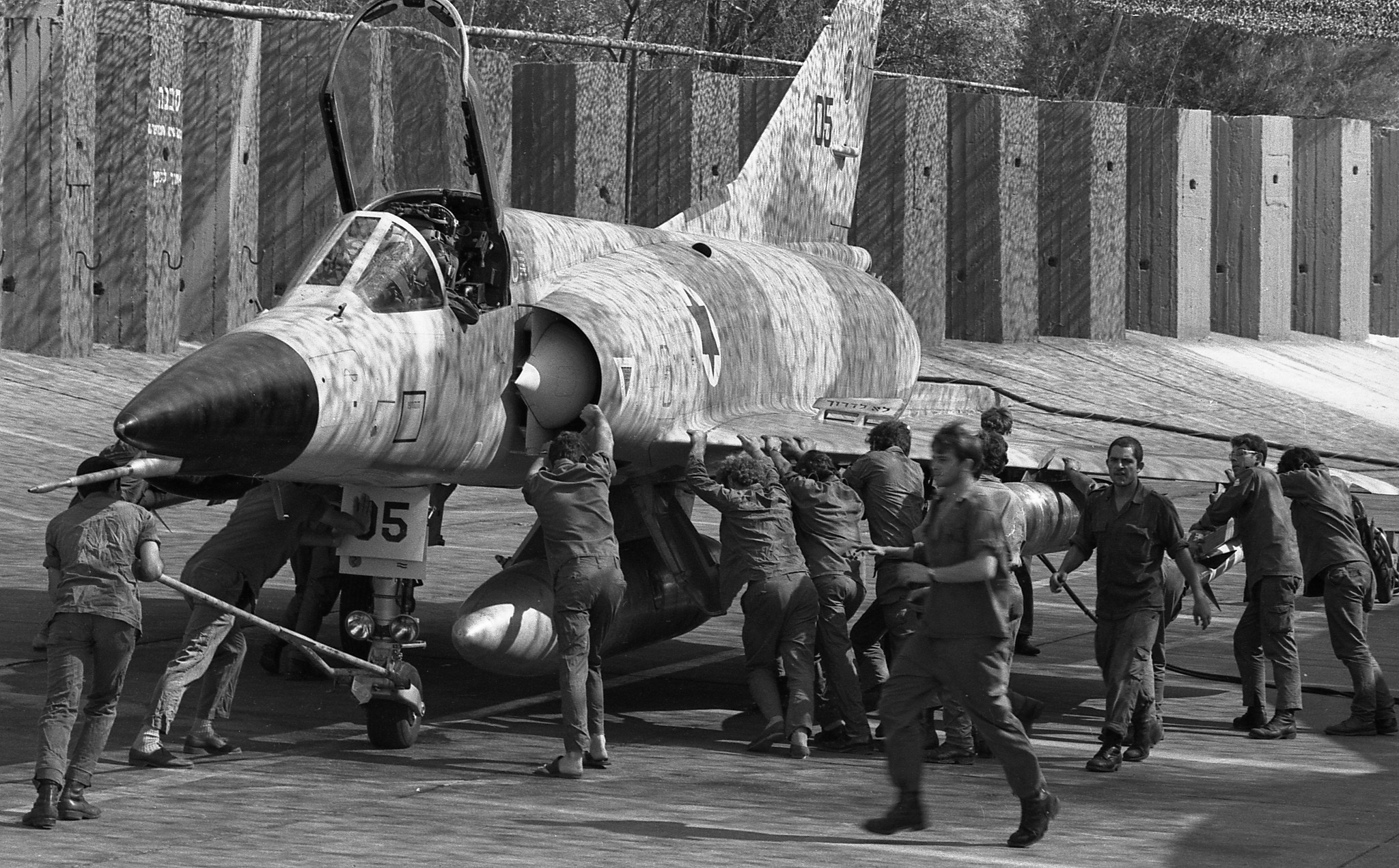
An IAI Nesher of the 113 Squadron "Hornet" is made ready for takeoff at Hatzor Airbase in October 1973

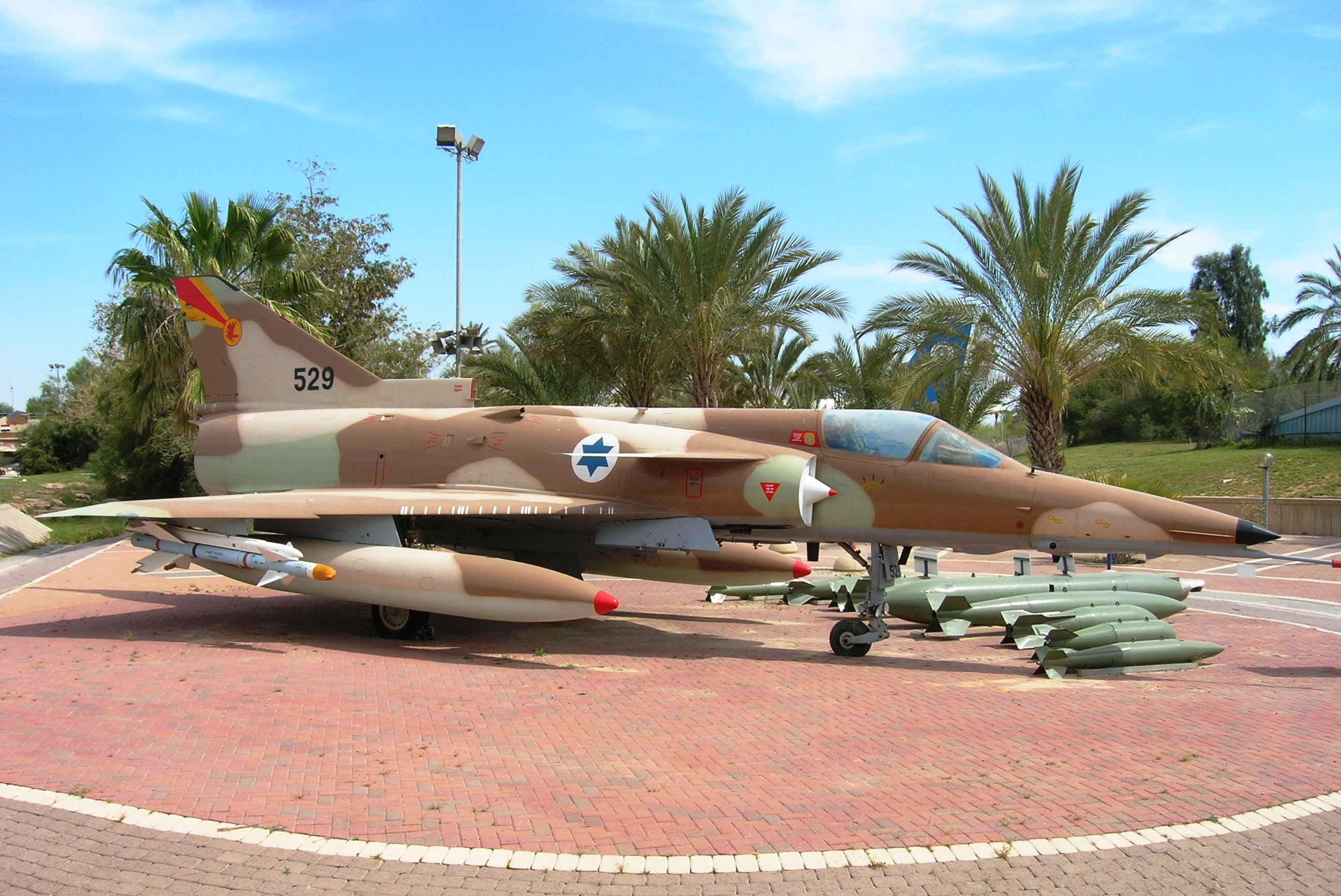
An Israeli-made IAI Kfir of 144 Squadron "Phoenix" from 1975, at the IAF Museum near Hatzerim Airbase

In the early days of the IAF – from 1948 onwards – propeller planes were purchased from various countries. From 1955 until the Six-Day War in 1967 only fighter jets from the French manufacturers Sud and Dassault were imported. When French president Charles de Gaulle then imposed a total arms embargo on Israel, the IAF turned to the United States and also built its own jets, such as the IAI Nesher and the IAI Kfir. This development can also be seen in the photo galleries above.

In the first 18 years of the newly founded State of Israel, there were only the airbases of Tel Nof, Ramat David and Hatzor, which had been taken over from the British, with the latter usually being used to station the newest and most powerful fighter jets. However, this changed over time, until finally in 2021 the last remaining squadrons there 101 Squadron and 105 Squadron with F-16C/D jets moved to Ramat David in northern Israel, meaning that from then on no manned jets were stationed at Hatzor (see Units).

=== Operation Shacharit ===
In April 1956, Operation Shacharit (Morning Prayer in Judaism) began with the delivery of Dassault Mystère IV A jets from France to Israel. 12 aircraft arrived in the first wave at Hatzor (see photos below), 12 more in August, and in October – shortly before the Suez Crisis – another 36 aircraft in two waves took off from France. On their way to Israel, the planes landed in Brindisi, Italy, to refuel. The Italians were previously stated that the jets are flying from Israel to France for repairs. For the last major transfer, they were divided into two groups of 18 with identical tail numbers, so that it appeared as if the jets were flying there and back. A total of 61 aircraft arrived in Israel (including a photo aircraft), but some of them could not be made combat-ready due to a lack of spare parts and ammunition.

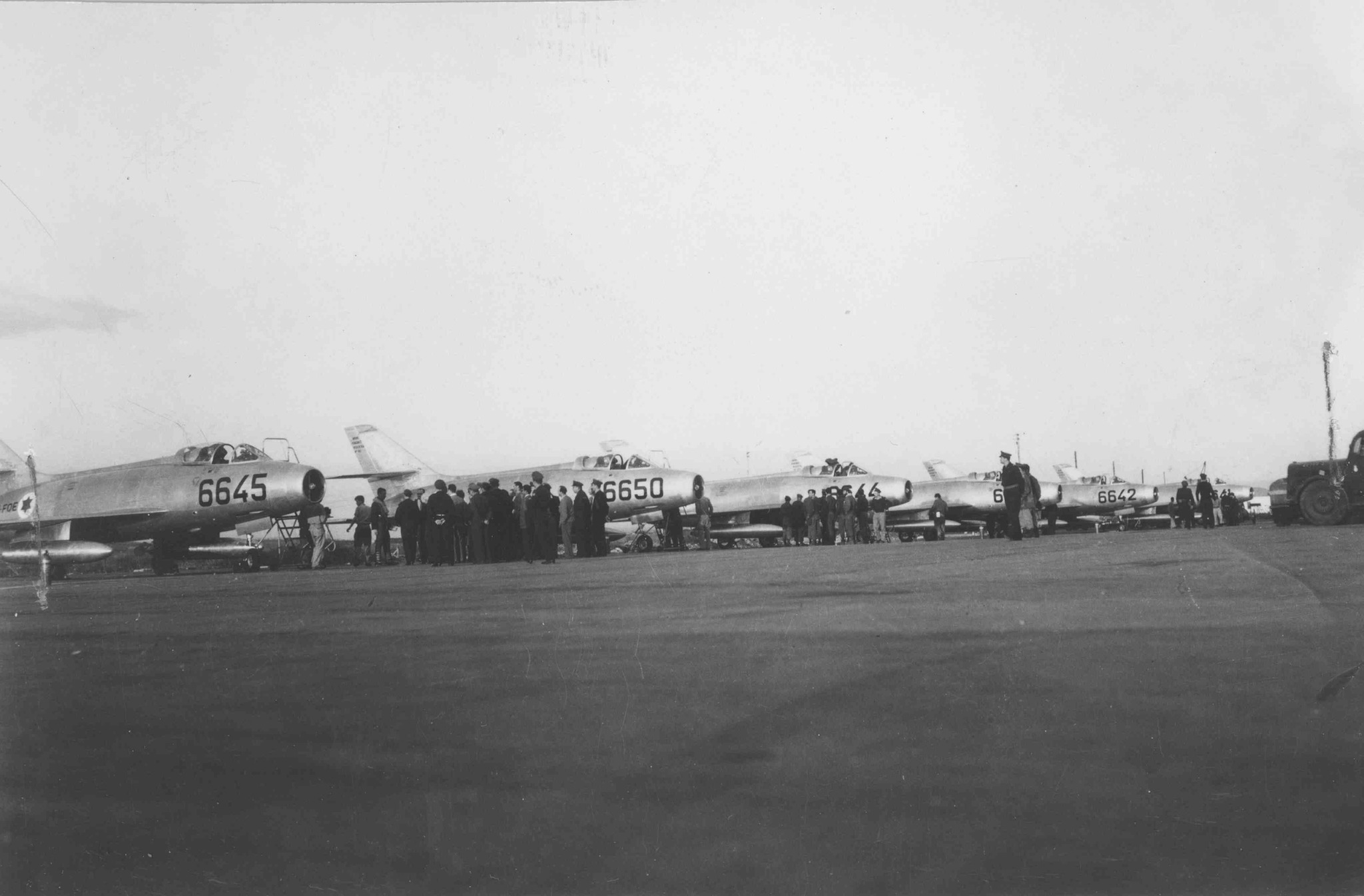
New Dassault Mystère IV A jets for the IAF arrived at Hatzor in April 1956 during Operation Shacharit

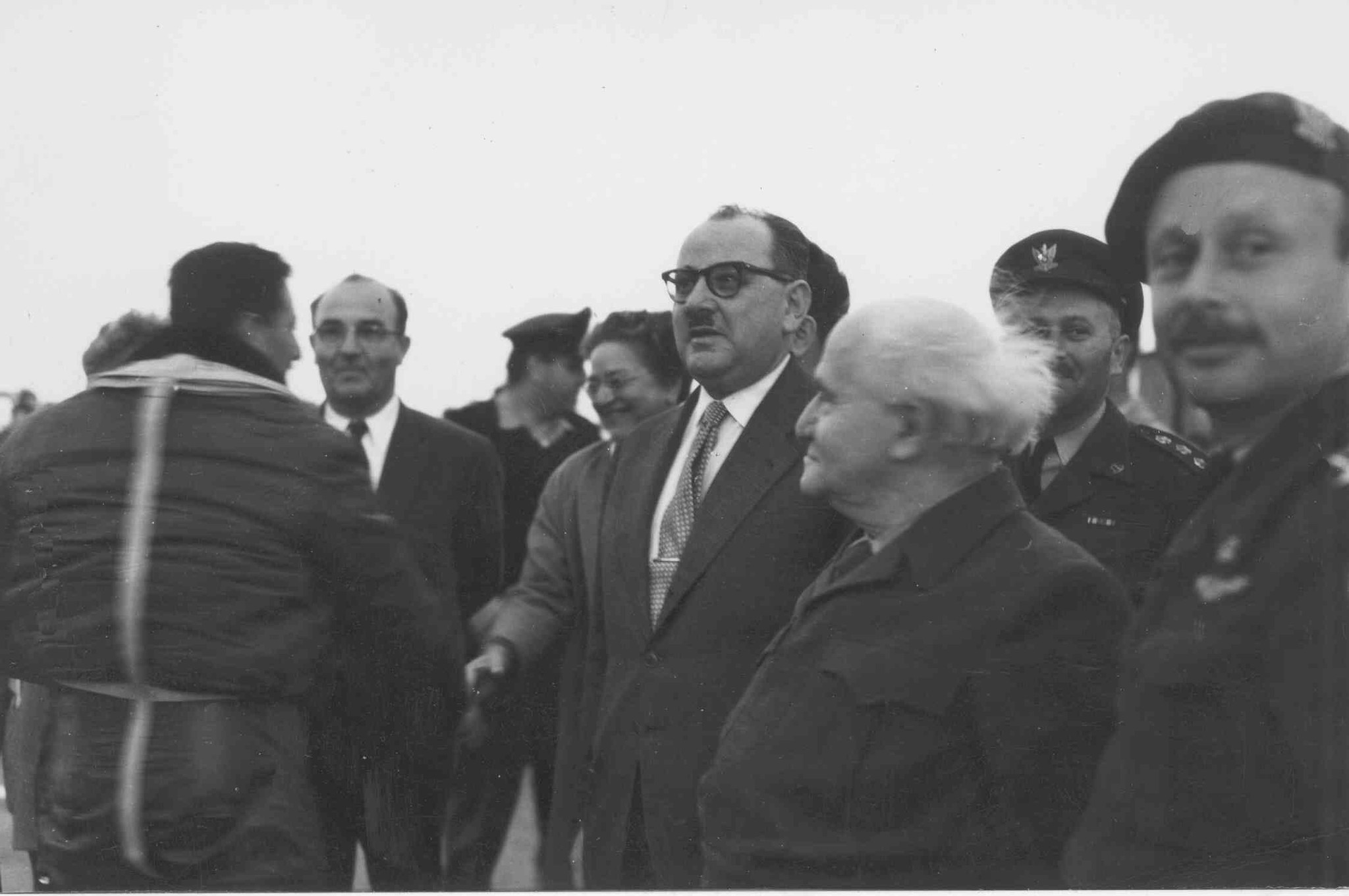
Politicians and military personnel at the arrival of the new Mystère IV A jets at Hatzor in April 1956

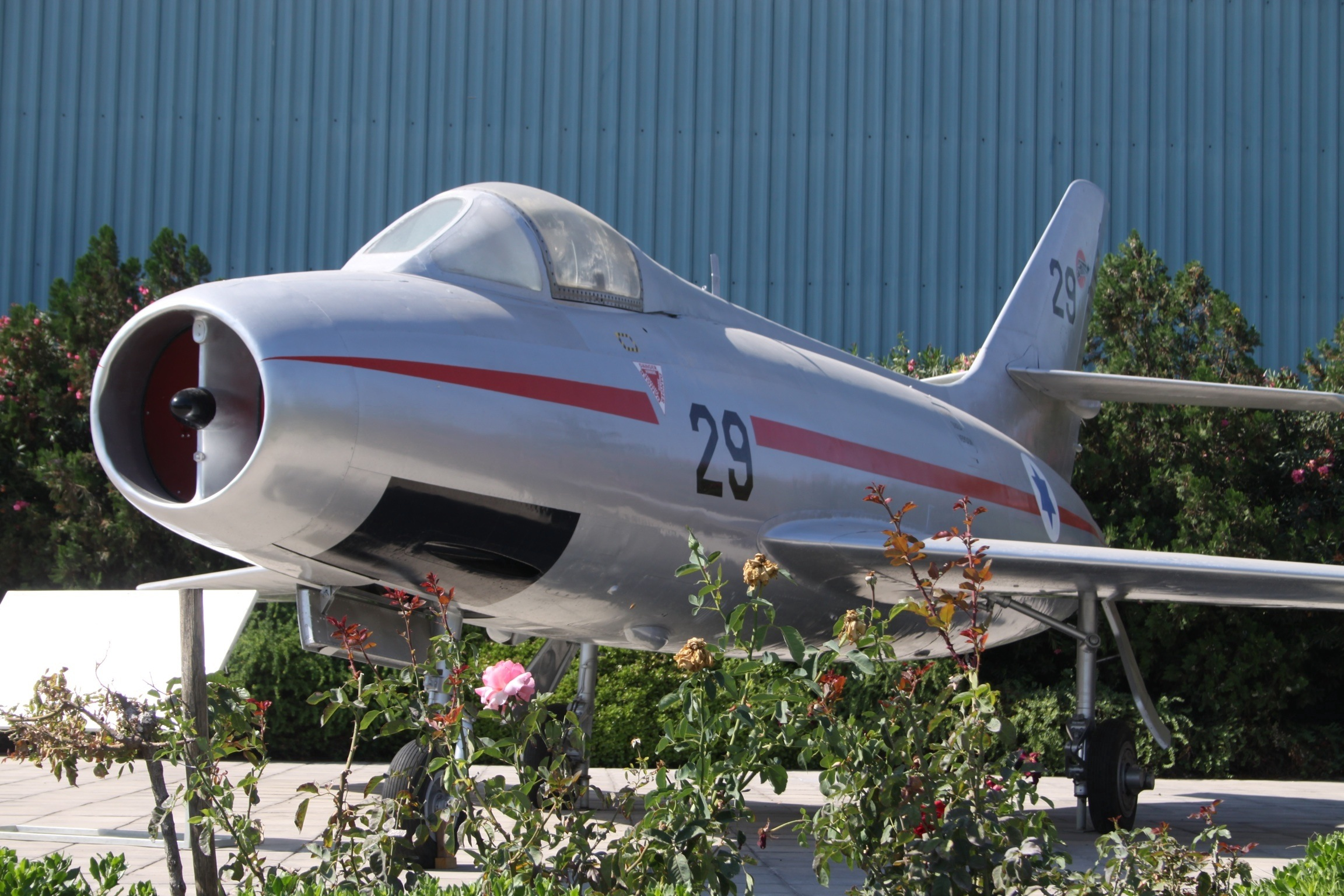
A Mystère IV A jet of 116 Squadron "Lions Of The South" of Hatzor, on display at Santiago de Chile 2008

=== Deserted pilots ===
- On 19 January 1964, an Egyptian Air Force Yak-11 trainer deserted to Hatzor with Captain Mahmoud Abbas Hilmi on board. The 26-year-old Egyptian flight instructor asked for political asylum after landing.
- On the morning of 16 August 1966, an Iraqi Air Force MiG-21 landed at Hatzor, the culmination of Operation Diamond. Munir Redfa, an Iraqi Air Force pilot, had been persuaded by the Mossad to fly the flagship of the Soviet export aircraft industry to Israel. The MiG was the most advanced aircraft in Arab inventories at the time.
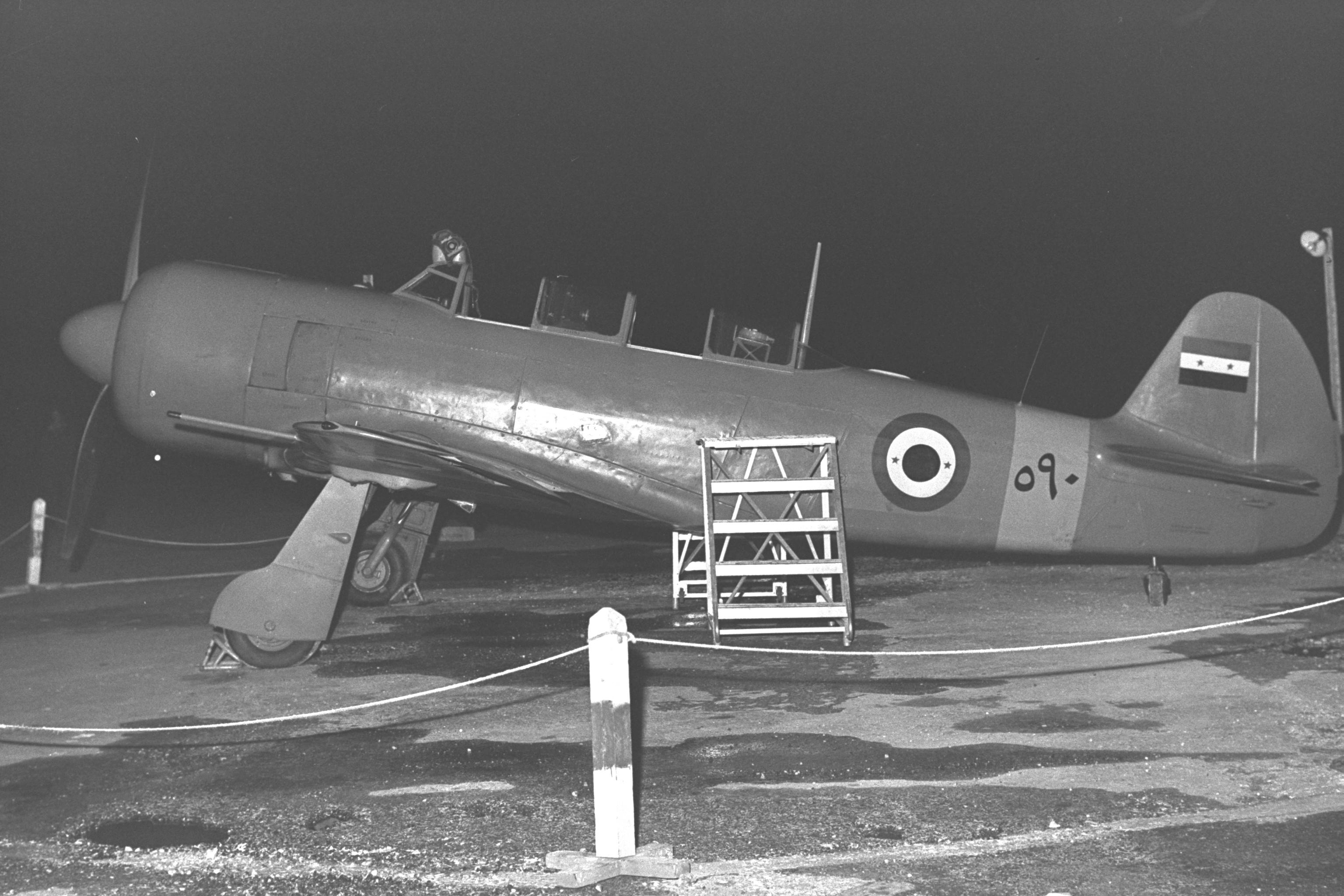
In January 1964, an Egyptian pilot deserted to Hatzor in a Yak-11 trainer

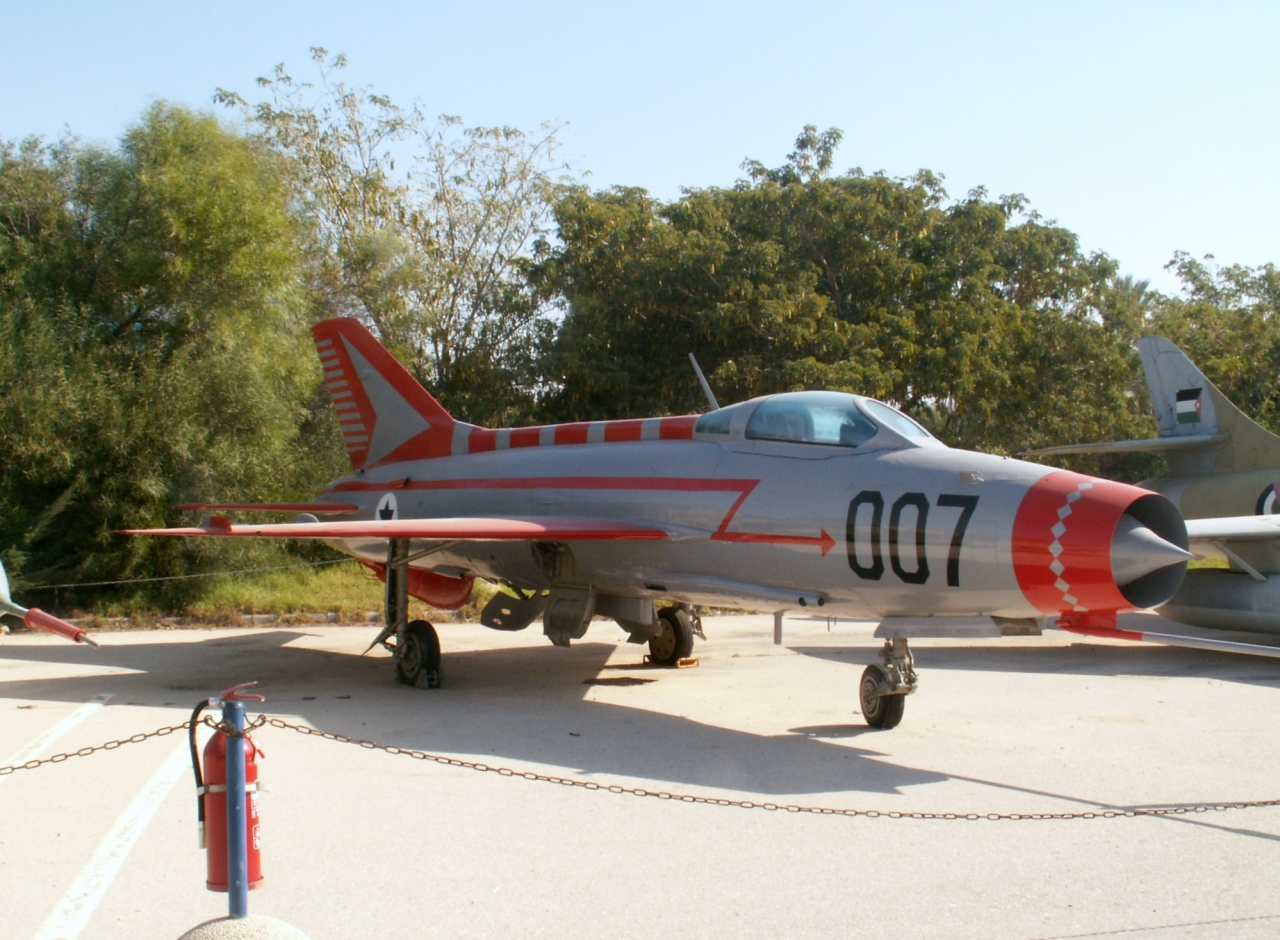
The MiG-21 that deserted from Iraq to Hatzor during Operation Diamond in 1966, now at the IAF Museum

Original footage from 1966 of the deserted Iraqi MiG-21 jet

=== Flooding ===
Since Hatzor Airbase is located in a valley between two streams – which, apart from a few rainy weeks, are dry most of the year – flooding has occurred repeatedly since its founding, affecting military equipment. This happened in the 1950s, in the winter of 1991/92, in 2013 and most recently in 2020, when fighter aircraft and a battery of defense missiles were so heavily damaged that repairs took five months. This is also a reason why the last two squadrons of manned fighter aircraft at Hatzor were relocated to Ramat David Airbase in northern Israel in 2021. Further expansion of the airbase will also take place mainly in the northern area, which is not affected by flooding (see map).

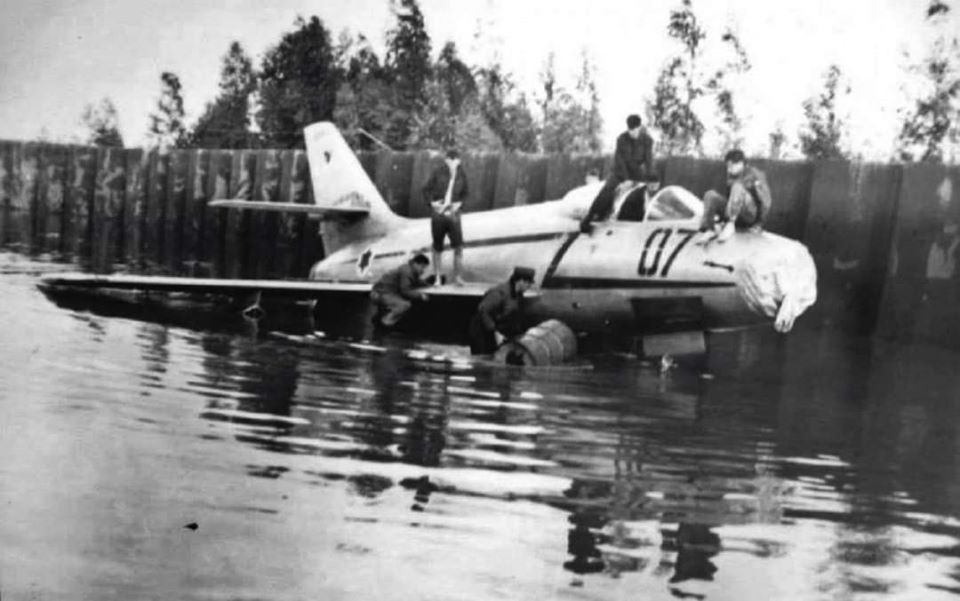
Flooding of Hatzor Airbase in the second half of the 1950s: an affected Dassault Mystère IV A jet

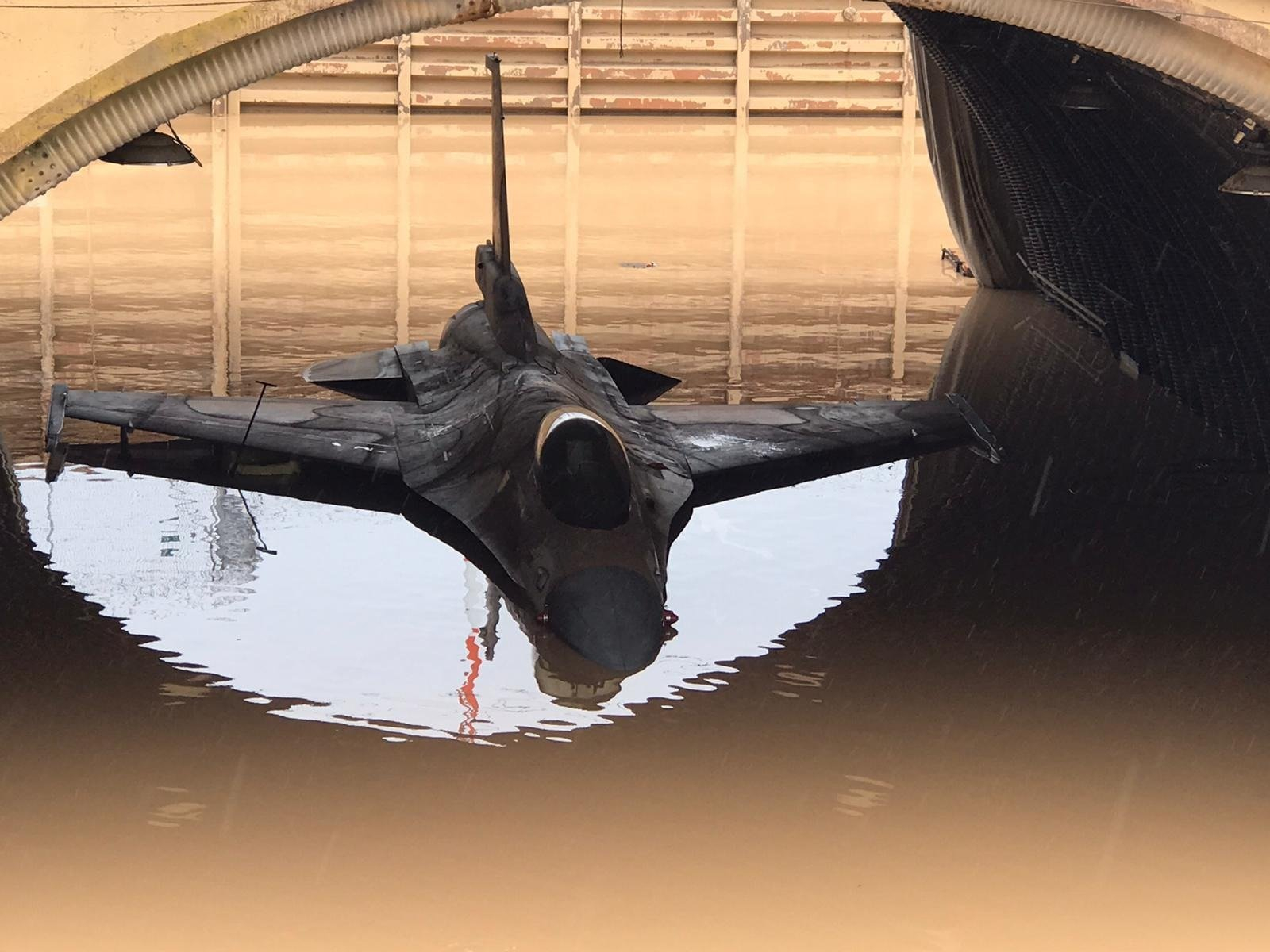
An F-16C Barak in the water in a shelter at Hatzor Airbase in January 2020

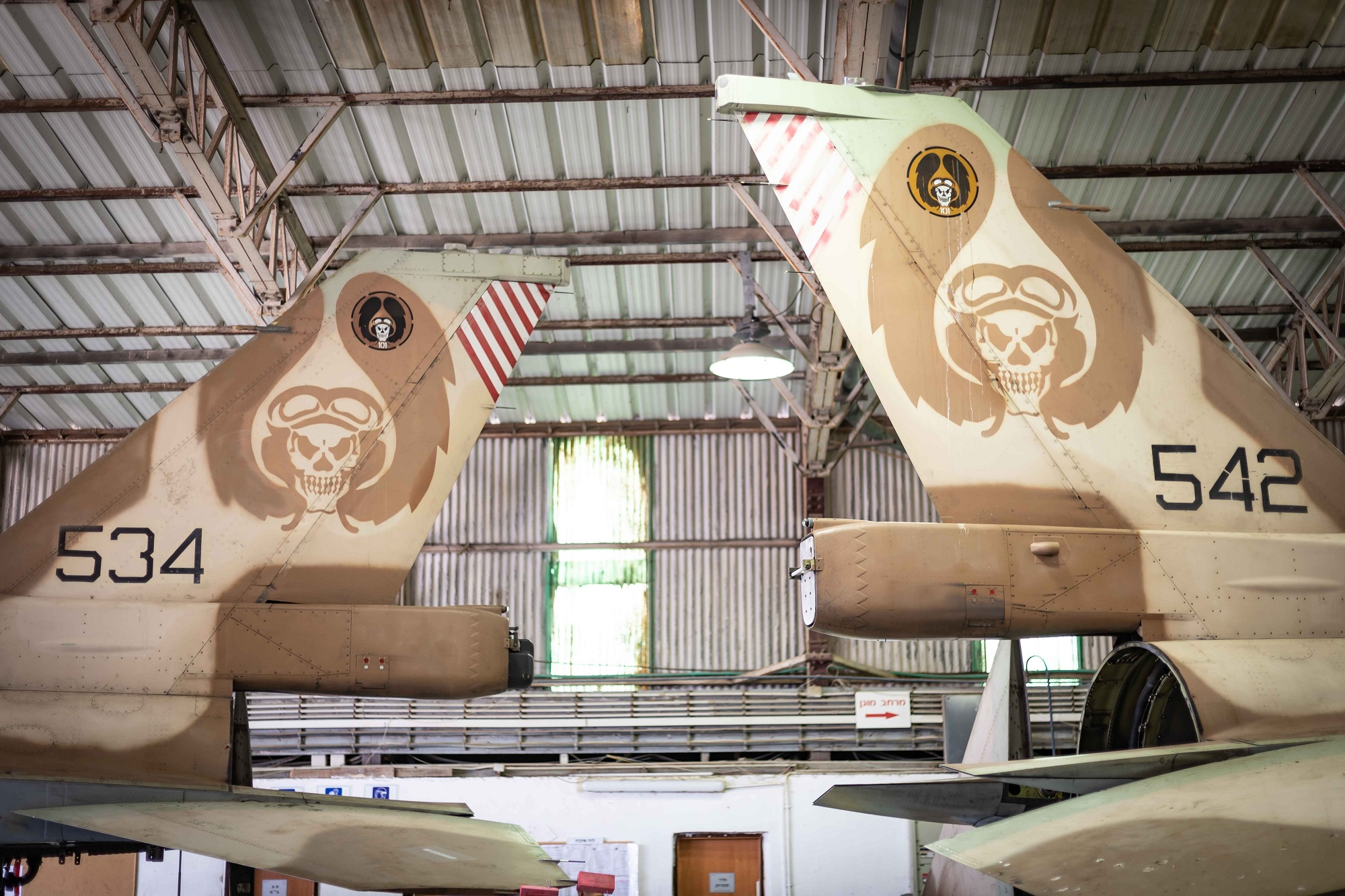
Damaged by flooding and now repaired F-16 jets of 101 Squadron "First Fighter" in June 2020

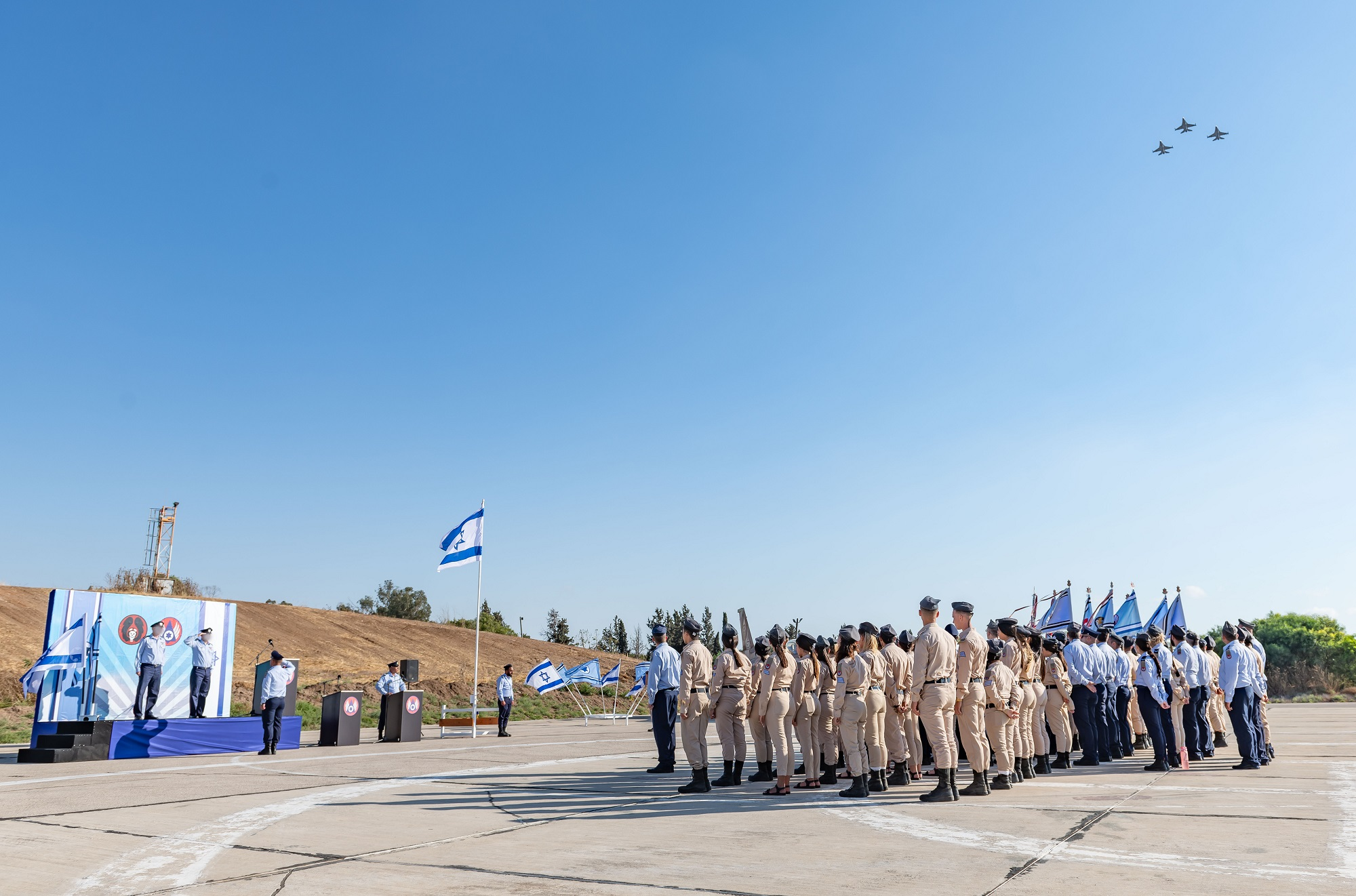
Farewell and relocation of 101 Squadron "First Fighter" to Ramat David Airbase in June 2021

=== Fighter aircraft simulator network ===
Since 2010 Hatzor has a network of eight fighter aircraft simulator pods which use satellite footage of countries including Lebanon and Syria to train pilots for deep strike missions. There are simulators for all F-15 and F-16 models installed.

=== Defensive missiles ===
On 2 April 2017, the first two batteries of Israel's latest missile defense system – the David's Sling – went operational on the airbase. A battery of the smaller Iron Dome system has been installed there since 2012, but was damaged in a flood in the winter of 2012/13 and had to be repaired.

== Today ==
- In March 2021, the base's two F-16 squadrons ("First Fighter" & "Scorpion") relocated to Ramat David Airbase to consolidate all remaining F-16C/D Barak jets under one roof. This means there are no longer any manned fighter jets at Hatzor Airbase.
- In July 2021, photos appeared showing the construction of a Combined Operations Center for the US military and Israel in the northern area of the base. However, no further information was released. Several new buildings had already been built there in recent years.
- In mid-2021, the 100 Squadron "Flying Camel" relocated with its Beechcraft King Air Tzofit and Beechcraft Bonanza Hofit patrol aircraft from the then-decommissioned Sde Dov Airport on the coast of Tel Aviv to Hatzor.
- In January 2023, the 200 Squadron "First UAV" moved here from Palmachim Airbase with Heron 1 Shoval UAVs.
- In September 2023, as part of the "Storm Clouds" project, the 144 Squadron "Phoenix" at Hatzor that reopened in August 2022 was equipped with UAVs of the newly developed Spark Nitsot (Orbiter 4) type. These are manufactured by Rafael and Aeronautics as a relatively small and flexible UAV that is also capable of vertical takeoff and landing.

== Units ==
- 100 Squadron "Flying Camel" – operating B200 "King Air" and A36 "Bonanza" as patrol aircraft
- 144 Squadron "Phoenix" – operating Spark Nitsot UAVs (Orbiter 4)
- 200 Squadron "First UAV" – operating Heron 1 Shoval UAVs
- 420 Squadron "Combat Trainer" – operating F-15 and F-16 fighter aircraft simulator network
- 1 Battery of Iron Dome missiles
- 2 Batteries of David's Sling missile system
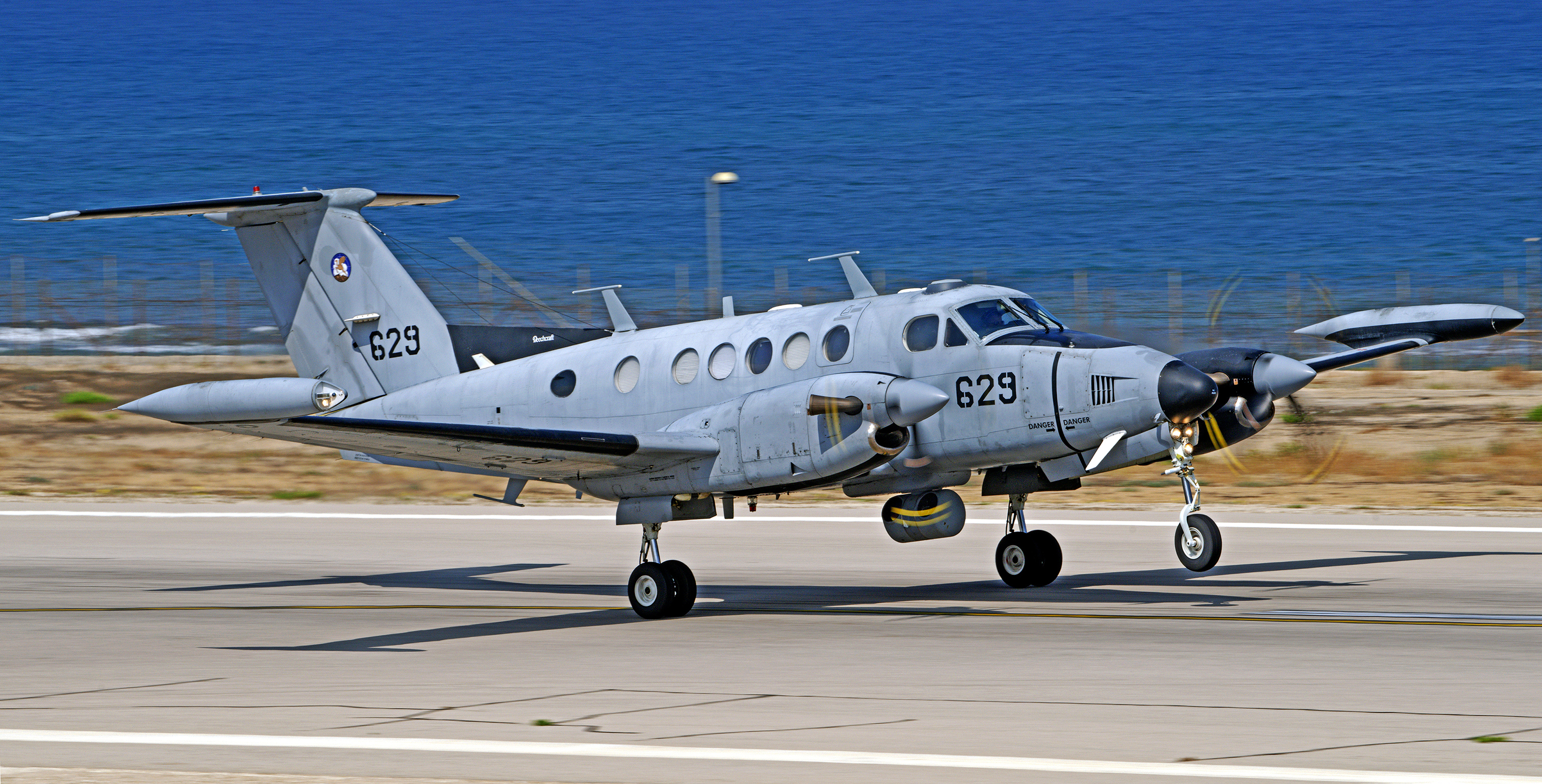
A Beechcraft King Air from 100 Squadron "Flying Camel", 2019 still at the then closed Sde Dov Airport

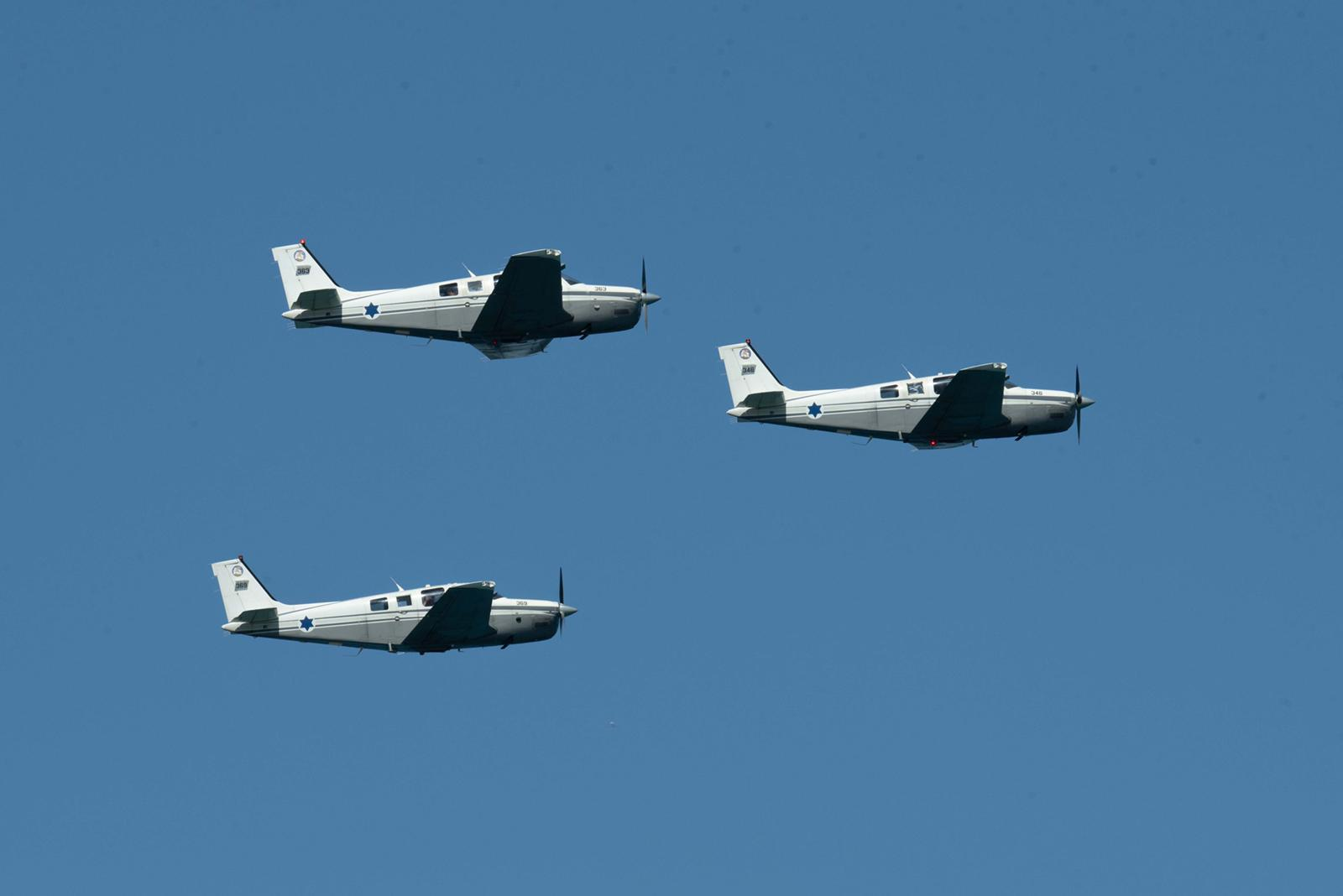
Beechcraft Bonanzas of 100 Squadron, flying over Israel in 2023 on Independence Day

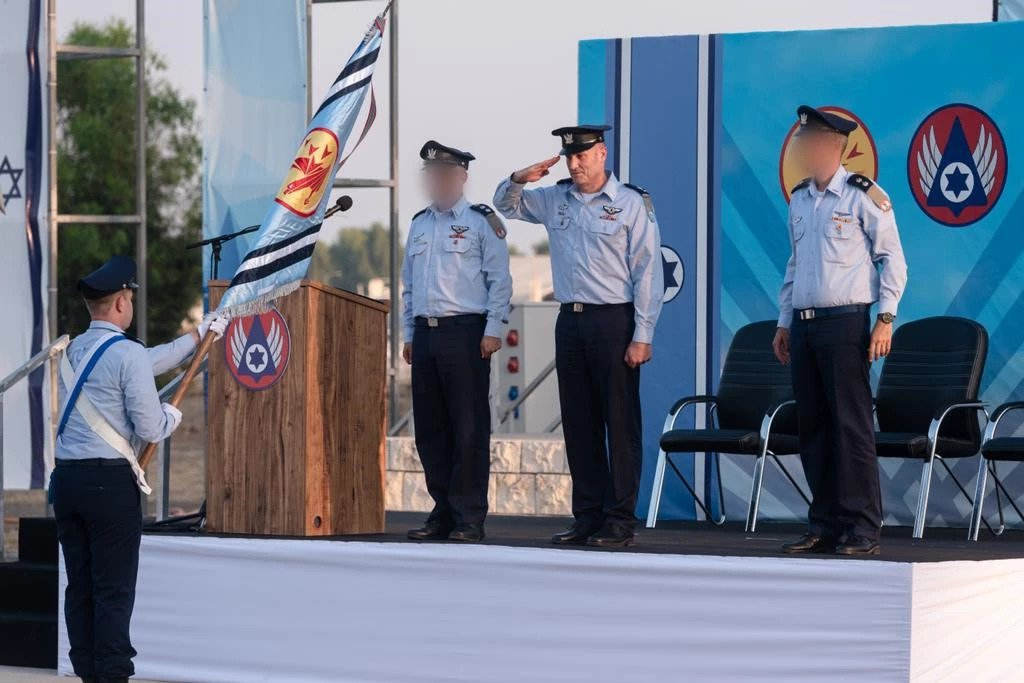
Reopening of the 144 Squadron "Phoenix" for Spark Nitsot UAVs (Orbiter 4) in August 2022

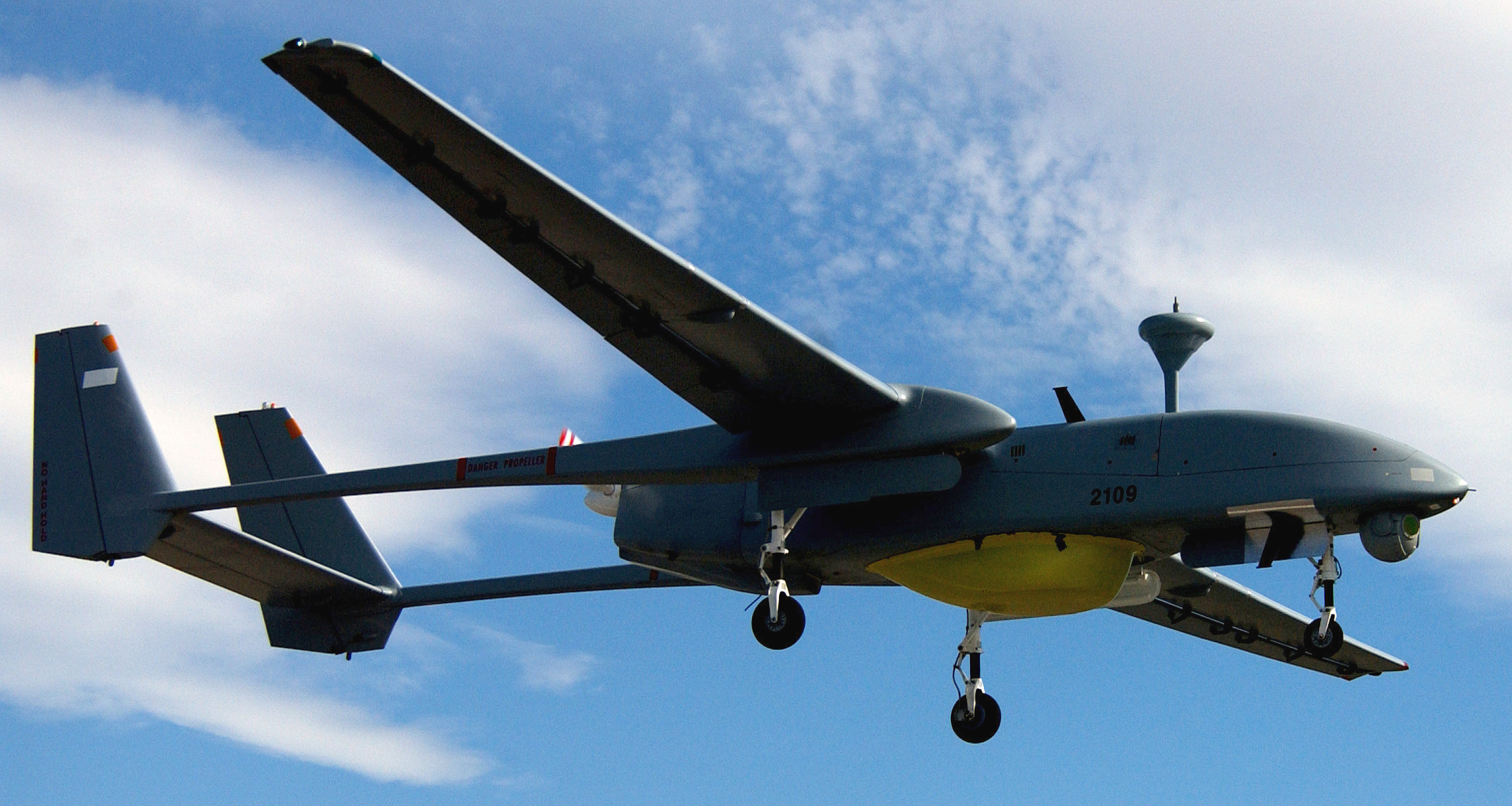
A Heron 1 Shoval UAV in flight 2003, stationed at Hatzor in 200 Squadron "First UAV"

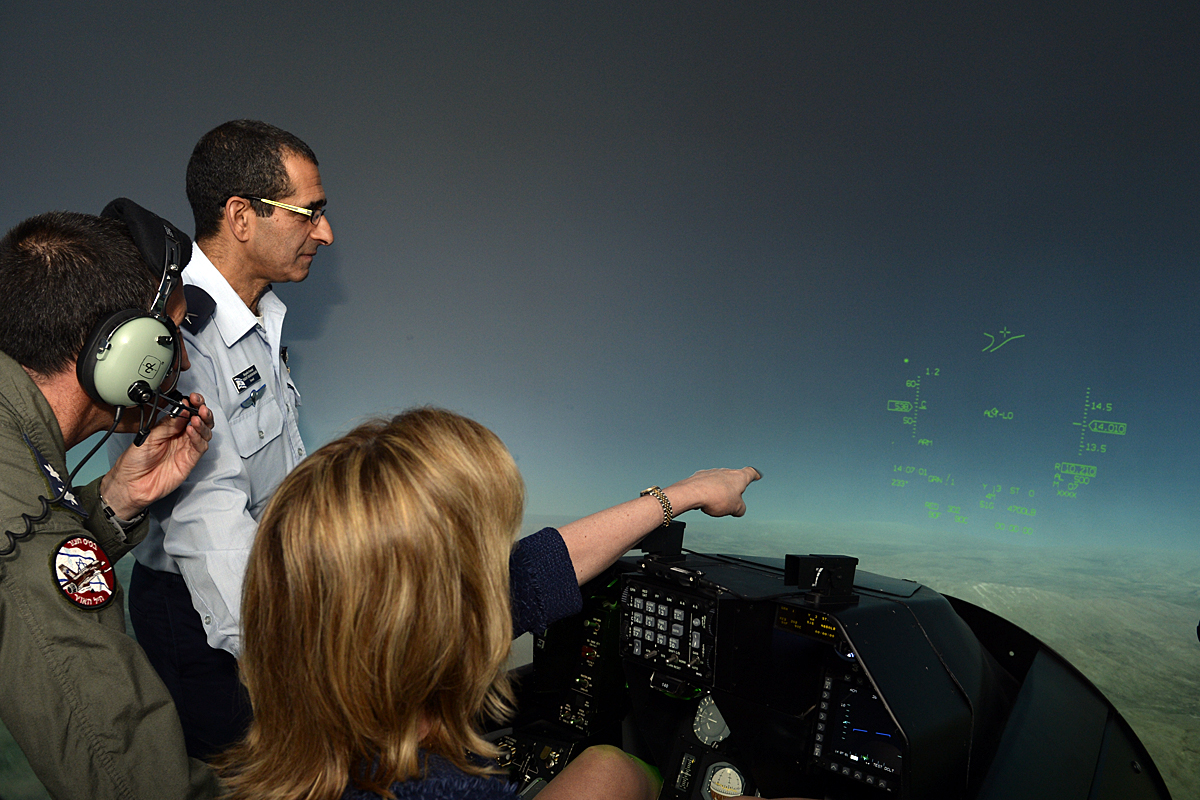
Deborah Lee James, then USAF chief, has a flight simulator at Hatzor explained to her in 2015

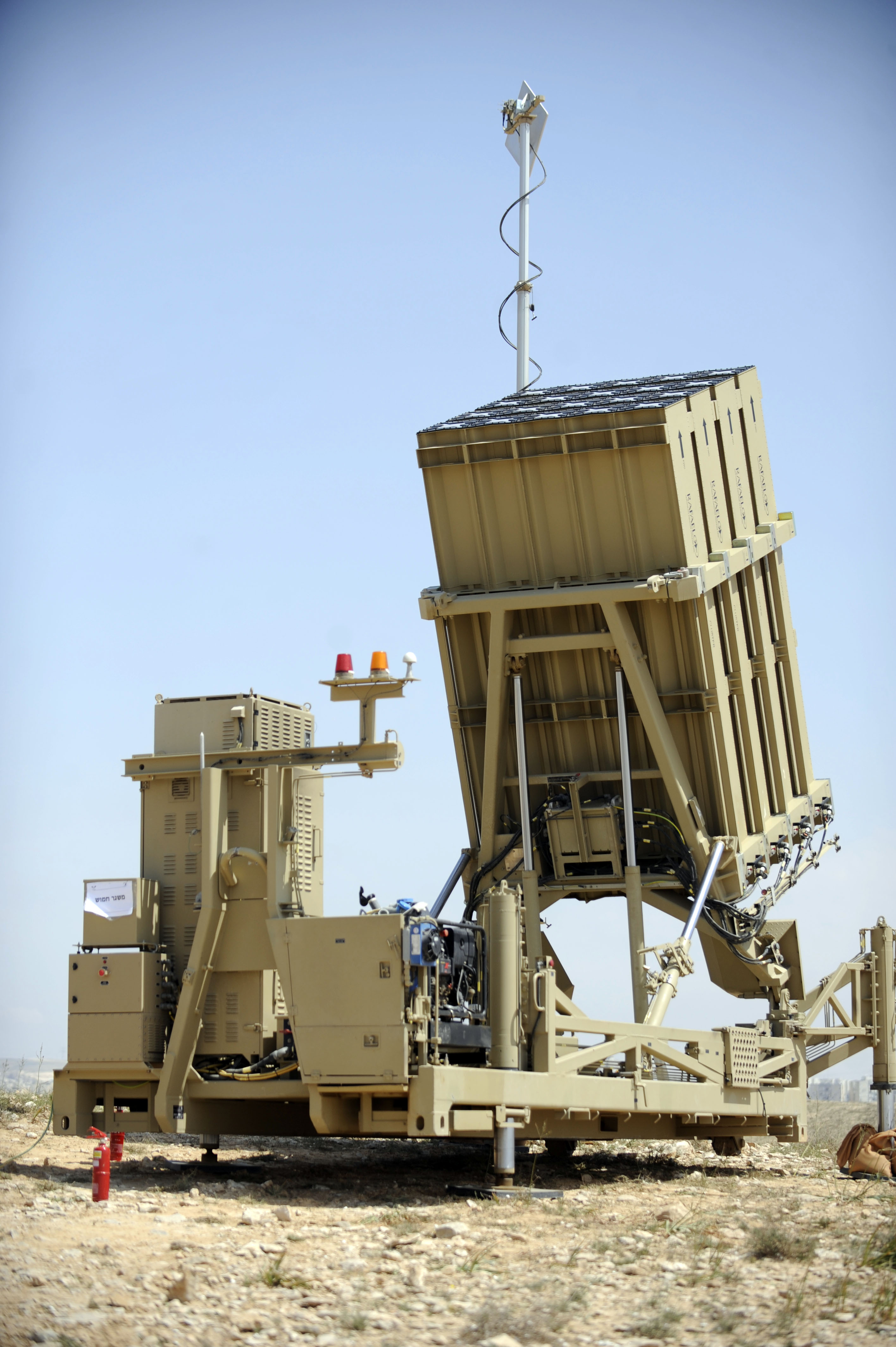
An Iron Dome defense missile battery like the one(s) at Hatzor

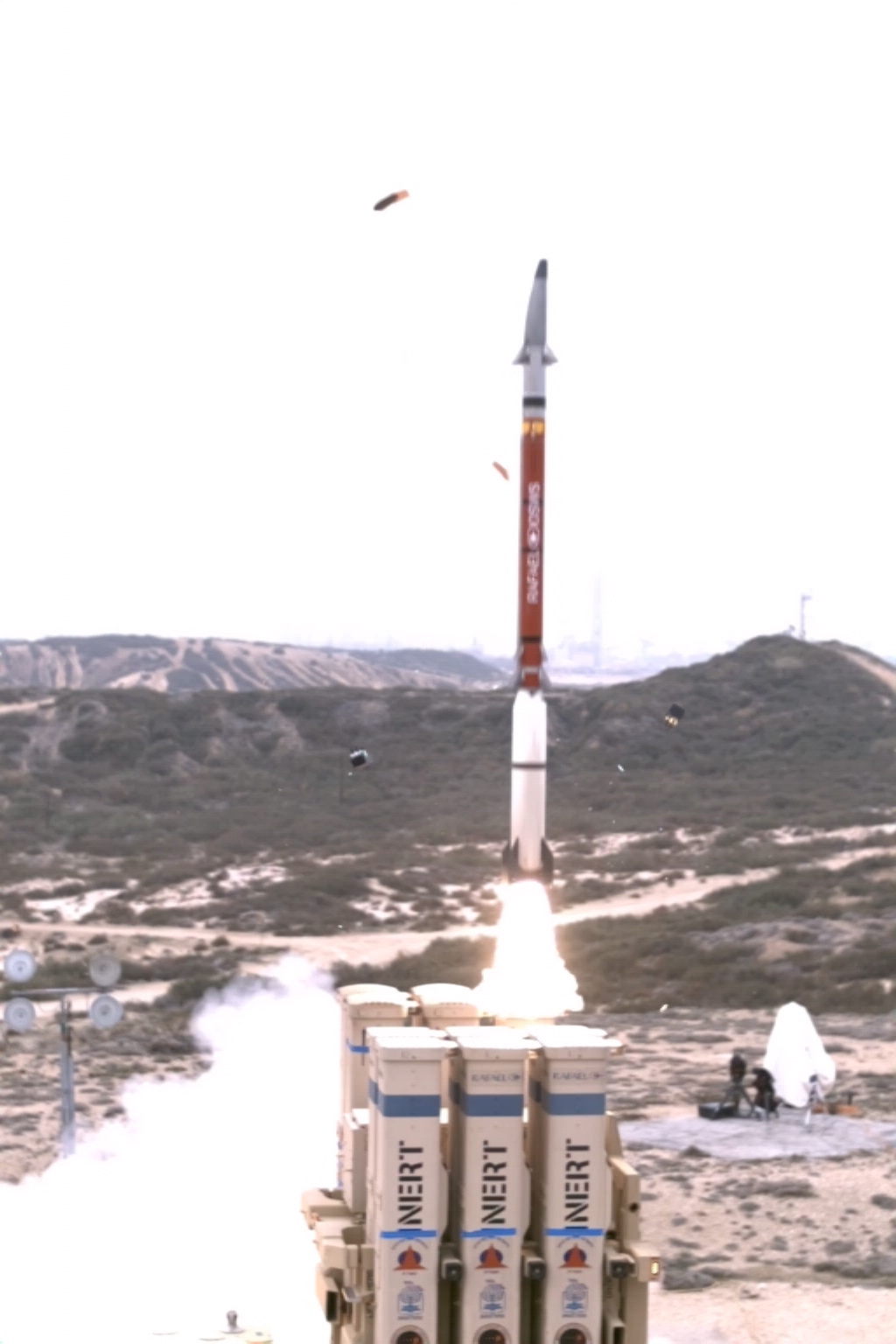
Test launch of a Stunner interceptor missile from the David's Sling system in January 2017

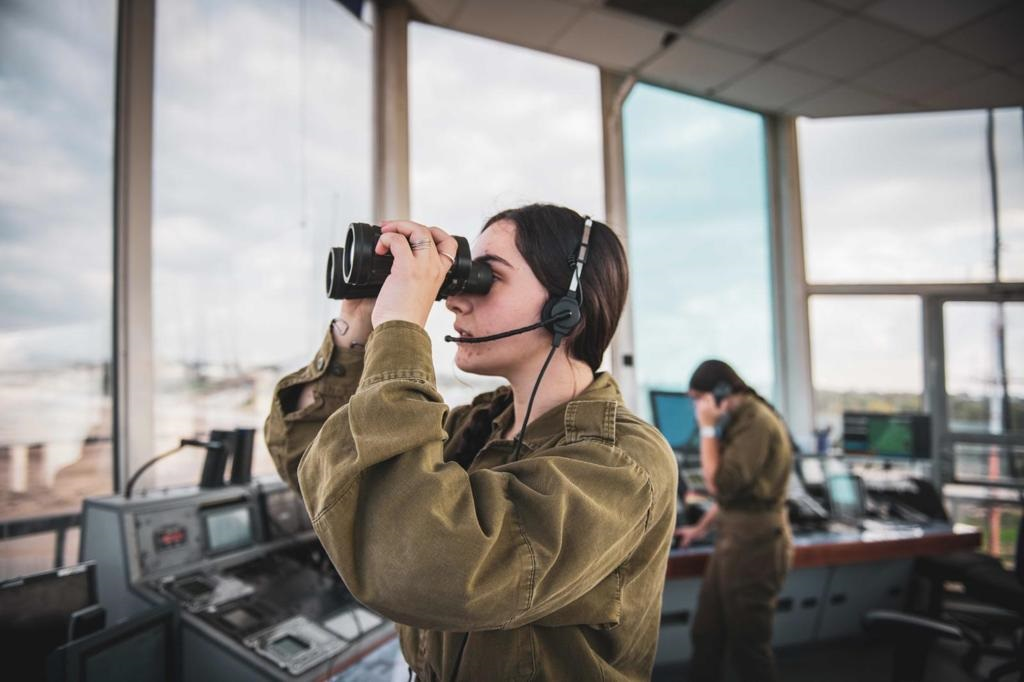
Flight supervisor in the control tower at Chazor Airbase in 2021 during Operation Guardian of the Walls

Note: IAF aircraft can usually be assigned to their squadron by the symbols on the tail

== Accidents and incidents ==
- During the Twelve-Day War between Iran and Israel in mid-June 2025, Iranian media sporadically reported Israeli UAV downings over Iran. One of these downings was shortly afterwards confirmed by photographs showing a yet unknown IAF drone. It resembles the Spark Nitsot (Orbiter 4) stationed on Hatzor in the 144 Squadron "Phoenix" (see also: Units). This smaller UAV is not capable of flying from Israel to Iran, but is said to have been deployed there in a swarm for reconnaissance or target designation.

== See also ==
- List of former Royal Air Force stations
