= Orna Berry =

Israeli scientist, high-tech entrepreneur, and businesswoman

- ארנה ברי
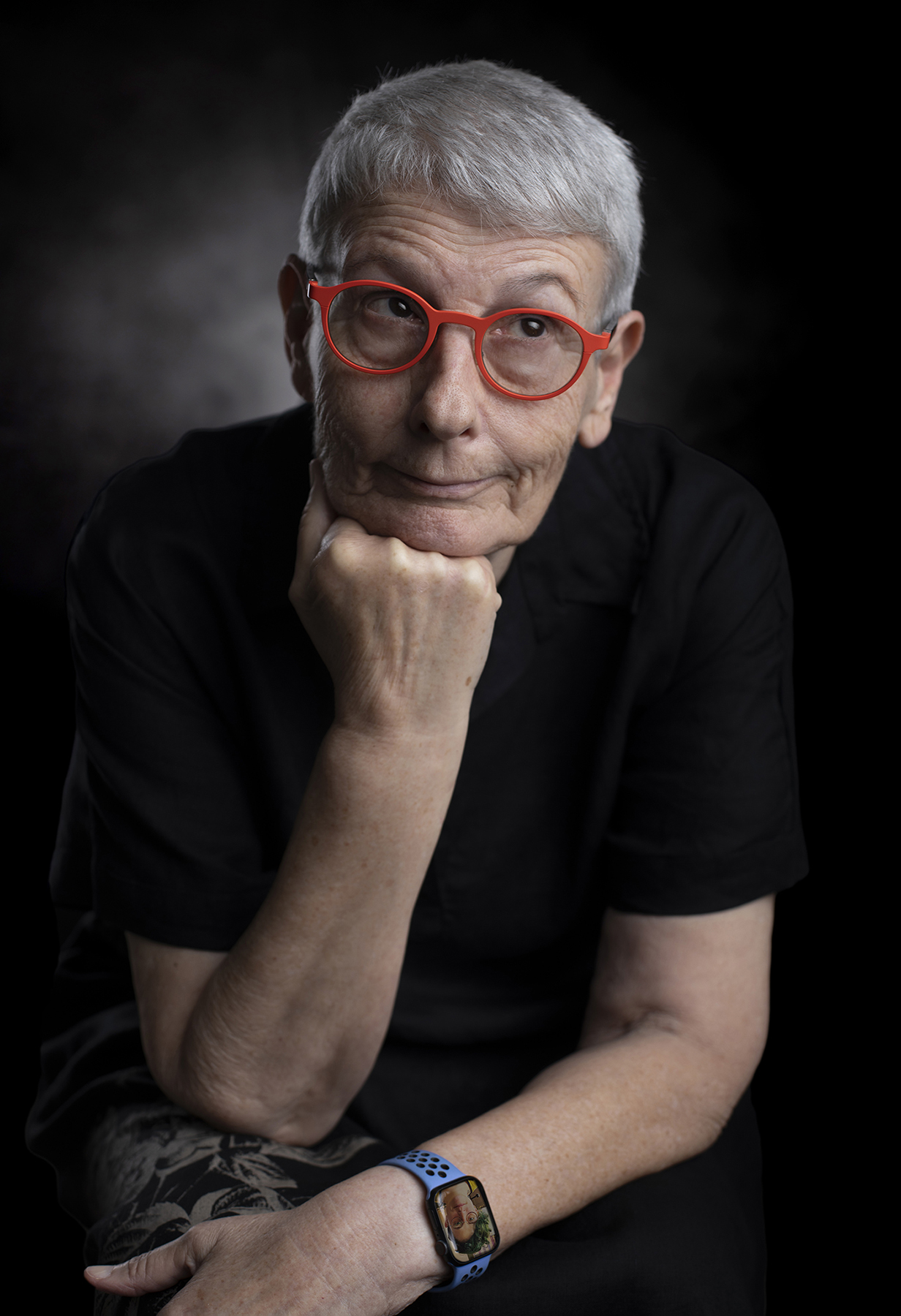
- Born: December 19, 1949 (age 76); Jerusalem
- Education: Haifa University (BA); Tel Aviv University (MA); University of Southern California (PhD)
- Occupation: Computer scientist
- Children: 3
- Parent(s): Yoash Tsiddon (Chatto); Raisa Tsiddon

Orna Berry (Hebrew: ארנה ברי; born December 19, 1949), is an Israeli computer scientist, high-tech entrepreneur, and senior executive in the Israeli science and technology industries. In 1996, Berry became the first woman to serve as chief scientist and head of the industrial R&D operation of the Israeli Ministry of Industry, Trade and Labour. She was awarded the "Yekirat Hanegev" award from Ben-Gurion University of the Negev in 2012.

Since 2021 Berry serves as Director of Technology in the office of the CTO at Google Cloud.

== Early life and education ==
Orna Berry was born in Jerusalem to Raissa and Yoash Tsiddon (Chatto) and was raised and educated in Tel Aviv. In 1967, she drafted into the Israeli Air Force, where she served as an officer for the flying school until 1970, terminating her military service as a lieutenant.

Berry received a BA from Haifa University in statistics and mathematics in 1975 and an MA in statistics and operations research from Tel Aviv University. She then enrolled at the University of Southern California (USC), where she received a PhD in computer science in 1986. During this time, she obtained a fellowship from the RAND Corporation.

Berry's academic research illustrated how distributed simulation programs could be accelerated via asynchronous distributed computations and was published in 1986. Berry was diagnosed with dyslexia, something which she says influenced her decision to choose a career in science.

== Career ==
=== Research and development ===
After graduating, Berry began working at System Development Corporation, later Burroughs and Unisys. It was here that she began her work in Local area networking (LAN). She decided to return to Israel in 1987 to work for the IBM Haifa Research Laboratory where she was involved with hardware simulations on different Intel chip architectures. In 1989, she joined Fibronics and led projects relating to bridging Token Ring and FDDI LANs.

=== Ornet Data Communication Technologies ===
In 1993, Berry co-founded Ornet Data Communication Technologies, which developed scalable and efficient Ethernet switches. While fundraising for Ornet, Berry served as a technical manager of an industrial project at Elbit Systems, and consulted for Intel. In September 1995, Ornet was acquired by Siemens. This was the first acquisition of an Israeli start-up by a European conglomerate.

=== Public service ===
In late 1996, Berry joined the government. She was officially nominated as the chief scientist and director of the Industrial Research and Development Administration in January 1997. She was the first, and as of 2019, is still the only woman to hold this post.

While serving in this office, she was the chairperson of the BIRD Foundation which helps foster relationships between US and Israeli companies focused on R&D. She negotiated the Israeli government's participation in the European Fifth Framework Program for R&D, and chaired ISERD, the governmental organization responsible for the country's participation in the program. She also chaired the joint R&D funds with Canada, the UK, South Korea, and Singapore.

Berry took part in the Brodet Committee (2007) and the Tishler Committee (2012) (2012), which were both founded to examine the Israeli defense budget and its management. Beginning in 2018, she led national science and technology initiatives in the quantum and artificial intelligence domains.

=== Business entrepreneurship ===
After returning to the private sector, Berry joined Gemini Israel Ventures as a venture partner, a role which she held from 2000 to 2010. As part of this role, she chaired companies including: Lambda Crossing, which manufactured optical components; Riverhead Networks, a DDoS mitigation company which was acquired by Cisco in March 2004; PrimeSense, a sensor and 3D capturing technology company which was acquired by Apple in 2013; and Radware, a communication company. She also served as director of Poalim Capital Markets and publicly traded companies including Aladdin Knowledge Systems, Alvarion, and Commtouch.

In late 2006, Berry was elected chairperson of the Israeli Venture Capital Funds Association (IVA), where she served for 3 years. In 2008, she joined a project to invest in Israeli pre-seed startups.

In 2010, Berry joined EMC Corporation as vice president and general manager of the company's centers of excellence in Israel. She was subsequently promoted to corporate vice president of innovation. As part of her role at EMC, Berry led the foundation of the company's new R&D center in Beer Sheva, where EMC became the first company to inhabit the Beer Sheva high tech park in July 2013. Berry stayed with the company following the Dell-EMC merger in 2016 until she stepped down from her role in 2018 to return to public service.

Berry returned to the private sector in October 2021 when she was appointed director of technology in the office of the CTO at Google Cloud.

=== Voluntary ===
Berry's involvement in the academic, public and business sectors are intertwined with volunteer activities which are based on her stated goal to harness information technology (IT) for empowering knowledge and other research areas, and to create social progress and economic growth among the local Israeli community and the international community in the U.S. and Europe.

Among her voluntary activities, Berry served as a member of the board of directors of the Kav Mashve Association, a non-profit organization for promoting Arab Academics employment based on their academic background and skills, a member of the board of directors of BG Negev Technologies, a member of the patents and intellectual property policy committees at the Ben Gurion University of the Negev, and she still serves as member of the executive committee of Ben Gurion University and board member of Ramot, the technology transfer company of Tel Aviv University, and TAU Ventures.

Berry was a member of the WIR (Women in Industrial Research) expert group which presented findings to The European Commission. She was also a member of the EURAB Research Council, where she replaced Professor Ruth Arnon as a member and contributed to studies on the expansion of competitiveness and growth as a result of extending the use of science and technology among other topics.

Berry was a member of the research team of the Association for Computing Machinery.

Since 2000, Berry has volunteered to promote education, employment equality, social inclusion and welfare in Israel and around the world, along with promoting Israel's position in the world.

From 2009 to 2017, Berry was the chairperson of the Israel, Australia, New Zealand and Oceania Chamber of Commerce (IACC).

From 2010 to 2017, she served as the chair of the executive committee of the Academic College of Tel Aviv-Yafo, where she also served on the board of trustees.

== Awards and honors ==
Berry has been the recipient of the following awards:

- 2021: Hugo Ramniceanu Prize in Economics from Tel Aviv University
- 2021: Peres Center for Peace and Innovation Award
- 2019: Ranked 51st on the "100 most influential people in Israel" list compiled by Israeli financial magazine The Marker
- 2018: Cyber Protector Award during Israeli Cyber Week
- 2018: Honorary degree from McGill University
- 2017: Honorary fellowship award from the Academic College of Tel Aviv Yafo
- 2017: Honorary fellowship award from the Interdisciplinary Center Herzliya (IDC).
- 2015: Certificate of appreciation from the Israeli branch of IEEE
- 2014: Inducted into the Women in Technology International Hall of Fame
- 2012: "Yekirat HaNegev" award from Ben-Gurion University of the Negev
- 2012: Ranked 70th on the "100 most influential people in Israel" list compiled by Israeli financial magazine The Marker.
- 2011: Viterbi Award from the USC Viterbi School of Engineering
- 2008: Ranked 4th in the "most influential women in the Israeli capital market" survey by Israeli economic news portal Calcalist
- 2005: Named "One of the 25 most influential and important women in the technology world" by American technology magazine Red Herring

== Research and publications ==
- "Speeding up distributed simulation using the time warp mechanism" (Doctoral dissertation, 1986)
- "Optimized virtual time synchronization" (Computer Performance and Reliability Conference, 1987)
- "A network management language for OSI networks" (SIGCOMM, 1988)
- "Women in industrial research: A wake-up call for European industry" (women in Industrial Research report to the European Commission, 2003)
- "EURAB Activity Report" (European Commission, 2005)
- "Globalization and Offshoring of Software: A Report of the ACM Job Migration Task Force" (ACM, 2006)
- "Emerging markets - Israel's technology industry as an economic growth engine" (Communications of the ACM, 2009)

== Personal life ==
Berry's mother, Raisa Shrira, was a nurse who served in the Palmach and the camps in Cyprus during the British administration in Israel, as well as in the Sheba Medical Center at Tel Hashomer and the public orthodox health care services in Bnei Brak after the establishment of the state of Israel.

Her father, Yoash Tsiddon (Chatto), was involved in Ha'apala activities of illegal Jewish immigration from Europe and Cyprus detention camps (where he headed one of the camps) to Israel and as a member of the Palmach, he accompanied convoys to Jerusalem during the 1948 1947–1949 Palestine war. Tsiddon was amongst the first combat pilots of the Israeli Air Force, where he founded the 119 Squadron, was the sole pilot in Operation Tarnegol, served as an air force base deputy commander, and became the head of planning and means of combat in the air force before being demobilized as a colonel after 41 years of service. As an entrepreneur and industrialist, Tsiddon won the title of "Outstanding Exporter" and later on was elected to the Knesset as a member of Tzomet party.

Her brothers are Professor Daniel (Dani) Tsiddon, former deputy CEO and head of Capital Markets, Private Banking & Strategy Division at Bank Leumi, and attorney Ram Tsiddon. Berry, who currently lives in Tel Aviv is the mother of three children (Amit, Yael, and Avital) and the grandmother of four grandchildren.
