= Ramot (disambiguation) =

Ramot is an Israeli settlement and neighborhood in East Jerusalem.

Ramot (Hebrew: רָמוֹת, lit. Heights) may also refer to:

- Ramot (Israeli settlement), moshav in the Golan Heights
- A Neighborhood of Beersheba
- Ramot at Tel Aviv University, Israeli technology transfer company
