= Dror Bin =

Israeli businessman (born 1966)

- דרור בן
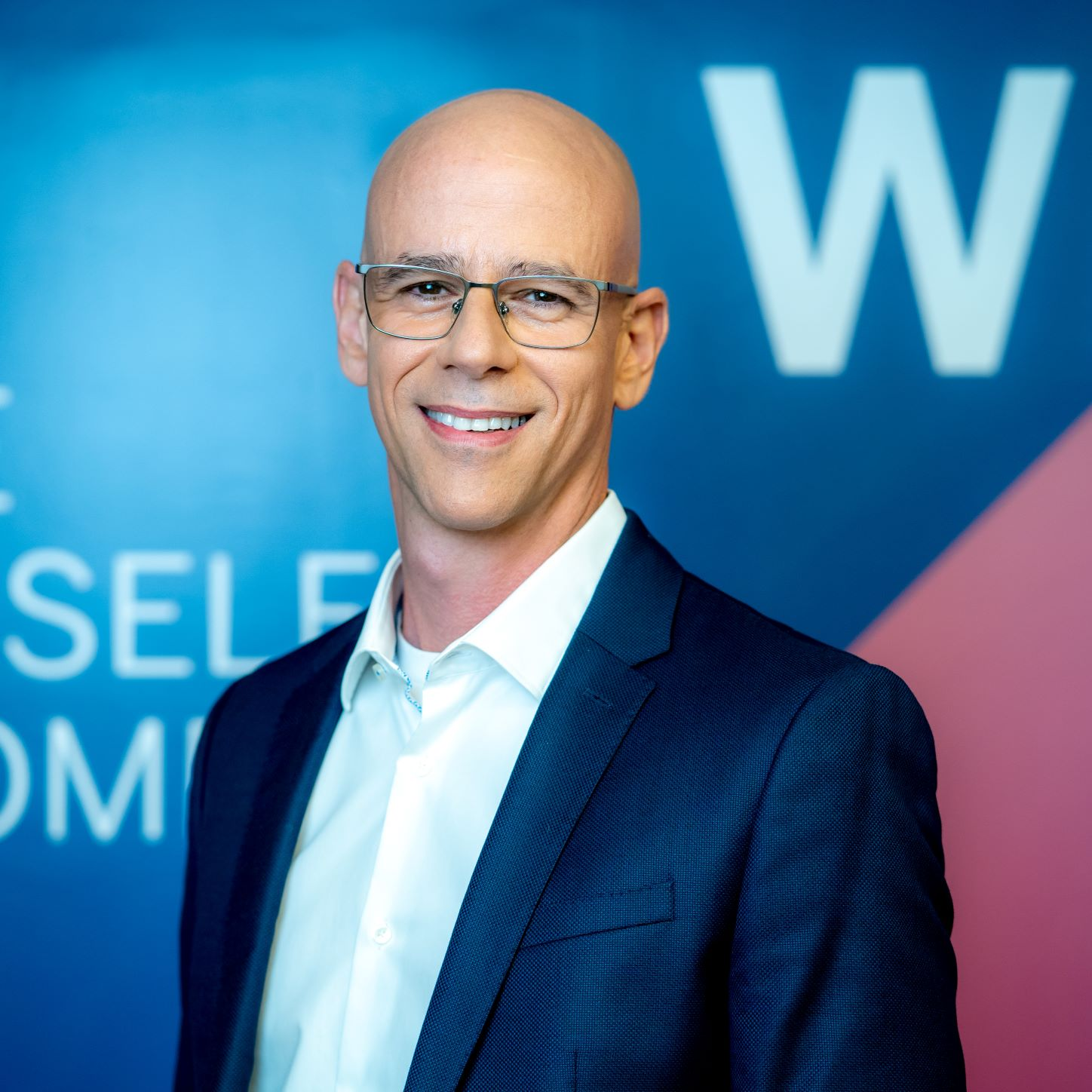
- Born: November 30, 1966 (age 59); Haifa, Israel
- Occupations: CEO, Israel Innovation Authority. Previously, CEO of RAD.

Dror Bin (Hebrew: דרור בן; born November 30, 1966) is the CEO of the Israel Innovation Authority. In the past he served as president and CEO of RAD, and in senior positions at Comverse, Viola Ventures venture capital firm, and Shaldor, a strategy consulting firm.

== Biography ==
Dror Bin was born and raised in Haifa. His military service was as an officer in the Israeli Air Force. Bin holds a BSc in Information Systems Engineering from the Technion, a BSc in Industrial Engineering from the Technion, and an MBA in Business Administration (majoring in Marketing and Finance) from Tel Aviv University.

In 1995, he was named a partner in Shaldor, a management consulting firm that puts together strategies for high-tech, manufacturing, retail and financial services companies.

In 2002, he began working at Comverse, at the time one of the world's leading companies in value-added services (VAS) and billing for the telecommunications sector. Bin was in charge of business development. including mergers and strategic collaborations. In 2003, he was appointed vice president, and until 2008 managed a variety of Comverse's business divisions. In 2008, he was appointed as a senior management member and executive vice president in charge of development and marketing of the company's overall portfolio, for all its R&D centers worldwide. In 2009, he was appointed as EVP Global Sales, leading activities vis-à-vis the company's worldwide customers.

In 2011, he joined Viola Ventures (Carmel), a venture capital firm, as an independent partner (Venture Partner) in charge of evaluating and investing in technology startups in a variety of markets. Later on he served as Chairman and member of several of the firm's portfolio companies.

In 2012, Bin was appointed president and CEO of RAD, developer of access solutions for communications networks. The company has its headquarters in Tel Aviv and a production plant in Jerusalem, with sales and marketing branches around the world. In 2014 the company also established a development center in the Hi-Tech Park in Beersheba.

From 2018 until 2021, Bin served on the directorate of the Israeli High-Tech Association in the Manufacturers Association of Israel. Since 2019, he has been serving on the governing council of Taglit.

In 2021, he was appointed CEO of the Israel Innovation Authority, the support arm of the Israeli government, charged with fostering the development of the Hi-Tech industry in the State of Israel. He replaced Aharon Aharon.

== In the Israel Innovation Authority ==
Since his appointment as CEO of the Israel Innovation Authority in 2021, Bin has led a variety of initiatives and programs aimed at maintaining and enhancing the competitive advantage of Israel's innovation hub, with emphasis on preparation for future technology trends and building an infrastructure to enable continued growth of Israel's high-tech industry. The initiatives are in areas such as financing R&D in knowledge-intensive companies at various stages, creation of an advanced technological infrastructure for use by Israeli industry, programs to meet the challenges of human capital in high-tech, dealing with regulation relevant to the implementation of technological innovations, the high-tech industry, and more.

Since assuming his position, Bin has advanced a variety of projects in transportation, quantum computing, drones, food technologies (Foodtech), bioconvergence and more, and has led the establishment of a national plan for developing an ecosystem of climate technologies (climate tech) in Israel, that covers a variety of technologies dealing with the challenges posed by the global climate crisis and aimed at reducing greenhouse gas emissions or mitigating the repercussions of the crisis. In this framework, in 2022 Bin led the Israeli innovation delegation to the UN Climate Conference at Sharm el-Sheikh (COP27).

In his role, Bin is working to expand the variety of the Israeli high-tech on three different aspects – thematic (disciplinary), demographic, and geographic, launching a variety of programs for high-tech employment and entrepreneurship among underrepresented social groups such as women, Israeli Arabs and Ultra-Orthodox Jews (Haredim) as well as training programs in advanced technological areas.

In October 2023, Bin announced a 100m NIS matching fund for startup companies encountering difficulties because of the outbreak of the Gaza war. Later on the amount was increased to 400m NIS.

In 2021, Dror Bin was nominated by The Marker magazine to its list of the 100 most influential people in Israel.

In May 2026, Bin announced he would conclude his term after some 5 years in office.

== Personal life ==
Bin is married and a father of three. He resides in Ramat Hasharon, Israel.
