= Ilan Ramon Youth Physics Center =

Physics lab in Israel

Coordinates: 31°15′46.38″N 34°48′17.22″E

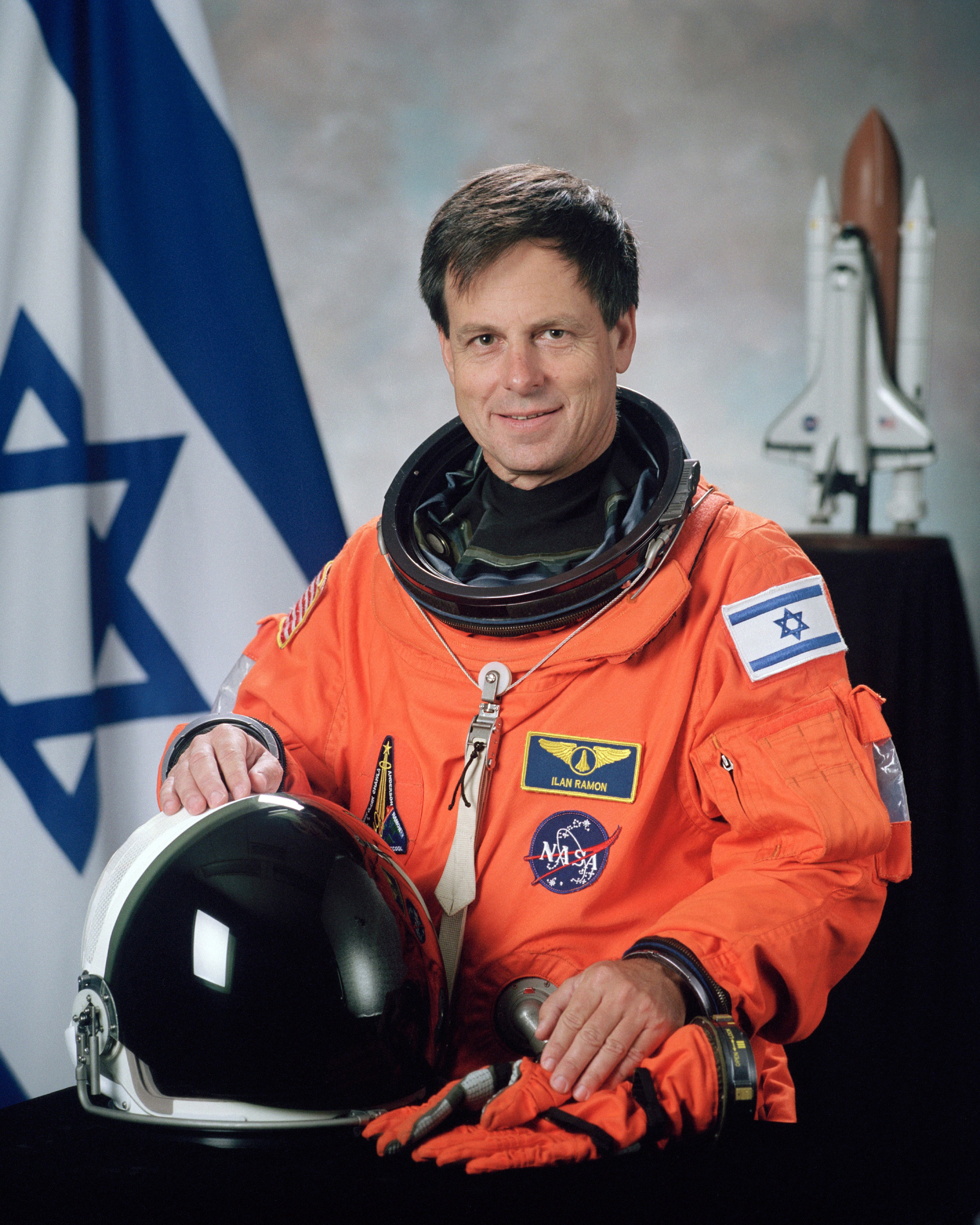
Ilan Ramon

The Ilan Ramon Youth Physics Center was established in honor of Ilan Ramon, Israel's first astronaut. The center was established in 2007 by the Rashi foundation in order to allow high school students that are interested in physics access to high grade laboratory and astronomy equipment. The center is located at the Ben Gurion University of the Negev and hosts students of all ages and of a wide cultural variety.

The objectives of the Center are to advance the study of physics and astronomy in high school; increase the number of pupils who take Physics at matriculation level and improve their matriculation results; establish and operate physics centers in school increase the number of physics and engineering students in academic institutions.

== Astronomical equipment ==
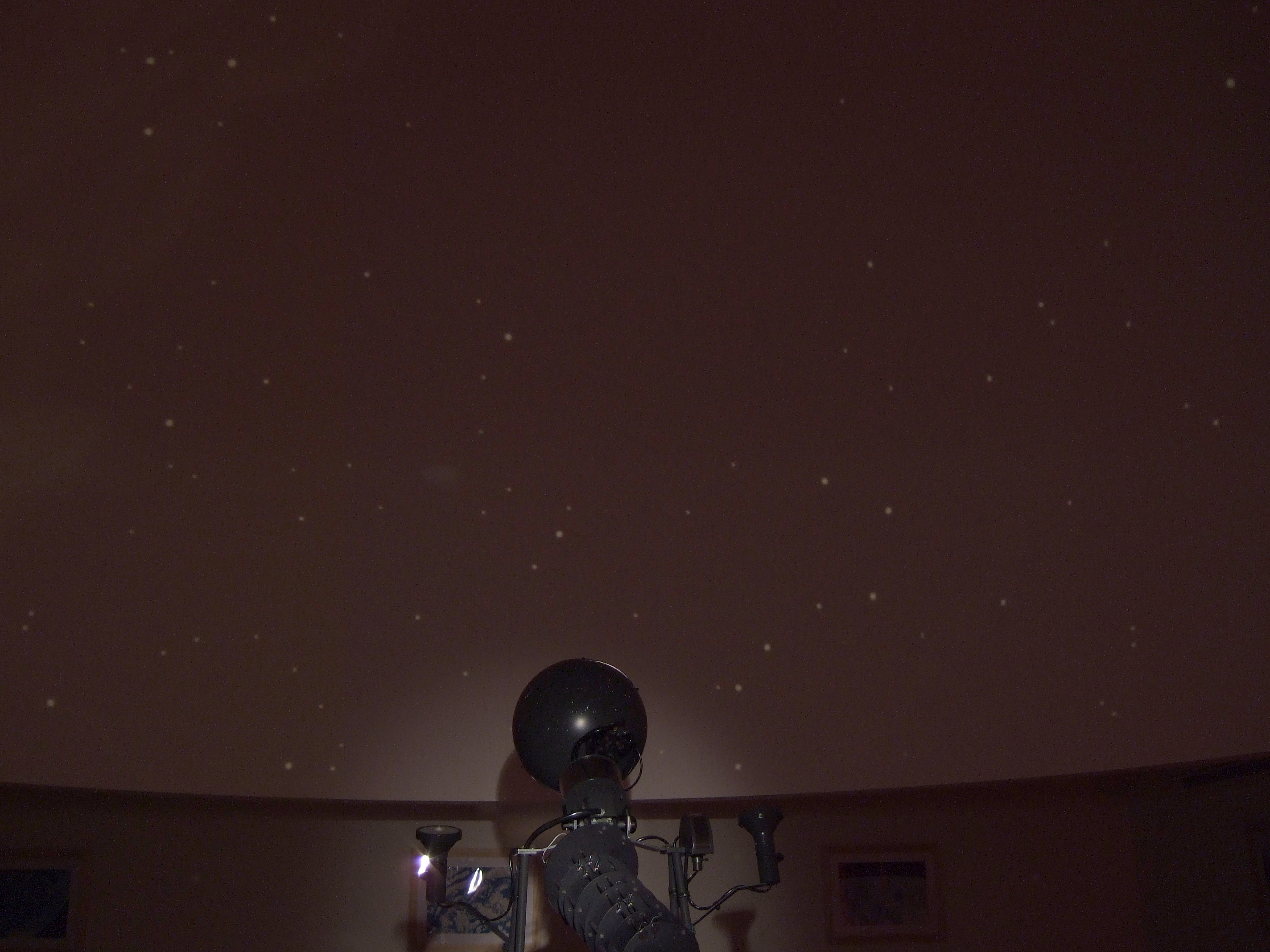
The Japanese-made Goto E5 Planetarium at work

- MEADE LX200R 16" robotic telescope, used for research.
- GOTO E5 planetarium, used for showing the night sky
- MEADE LightSwitch 8"
- Meade LightBridge 10"
- MEADE ETX-125 PE
- Coronado PST solar telescope, used for daytime observations

== Laboratory equipment ==
The laboratories are equipped with a variety of physics experiment kits, for both modern and classical physics.

== See also ==
- List of astronomical observatories
