= 157 Squadron (Israel) =

157 Squadron IAF
- טייסת 157
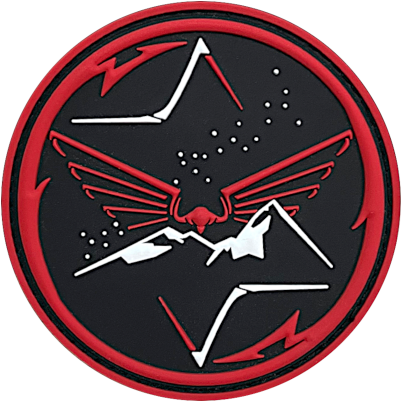
- Logo of the Squadron
- Active: 2006 – 2025
- Country: Israel
- Allegiance: Israel Defense Forces
- Branch: Israeli Air Force
- Type: Unmanned Aerial Vehicle Squadron
- Role: Electronic Warfare
- Garrison/HQ: Ramat David Airbase
- Nickname: Within the valley
- Mottos: And today I will fuse the city with a fortress and an iron pillar for copper walls throughout the land

Aircraft flown
- Unspecified UAVs

157 Squadron, also known as Squadron in the valley is a squadron in the Israeli Air Force at the Ramat David Airbase, specialised in Electronic Warfare.

== History ==
=== Second Lebanon War ===
The unit was established in 2006, at the outbreak of the Second Lebanon War, from the merger of Squadron 153 and Squadron 557. The squadron participated in the Second Lebanon War.

=== Space mission ===
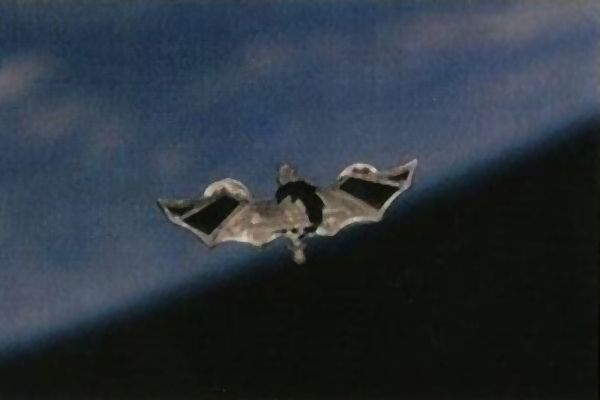
Photograph of the warrior pin of the squadron in space taken from International Space Station

In May 2010, as part of the STS-132 mission of the Space Shuttle Atlantis, the warrior pin of Tal Ramon (son of Col. Ilan Ramon) who served in the unit was flown to the International Space Station and released into space in his name and in memory of his father, who perished as part of Space Shuttle Columbia disaster. The pin was photographed against the background of outer space . A copy of the pin and a certificate of authenticity were given to the commander of the unit, in the commemorative corner of the squadron, at the Ramat David Airbase.

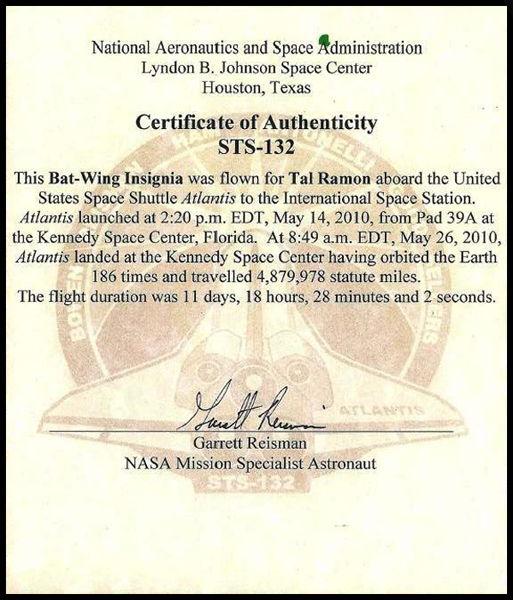

==== 2010 Mount Carmel forest fire ====
In December 2010, during the 2010 Mount Carmel forest fire, the squadron played a key role in coordinating ground units as well as Aerial firefighting.

=== Adoption program ===
As a combat operational unit, the squadron and its soldiers are frequently adopted by various bodies in Israel and around the world, as part of the "Adopt a Battalion" project so it was adopted in 2014 by the CFO Forum, and in 2015 by the Friends of the IDF organization.

=== At present ===
The squadron is currently stationed at the Ramat David Airbase and is a specialised squadron for electronic warfare utilising Unmanned Aerial Vehicles

== Notable Commanders ==
- Lt. Col. Eran Giladi (2006–2009).
- Lt. Col. Assaf (2010–2013).
- Lt. Col. R. (full name redacted) (2013-).
- Rest of the names are redacted due to security concerns

== Motto ==
The motto of the squadron is "And today I will fuse the city with a fortress and an iron pillar for copper walls throughout the land", which refers to verse 18 of chapter 1 of the Book of Jeremiah.

== Sources & References ==
- מיקום היחידה, שמה וסמלה - Amir Segev, founder and editor of the airport website
- מרקיע שחקים
- אתר nrg
- The Air Force website, in the "Army and Security" forum on Fresh website.
- "לראשונה: בנות המדרש ישמשו כמפעילות ל.א". Israeli Air Force (in Hebrew). November 30, 2014.
