= Israel Innovation Authority =

Support and investment arm of the Israeli government

- רשות החדשנות; Rashut HaHadshanut
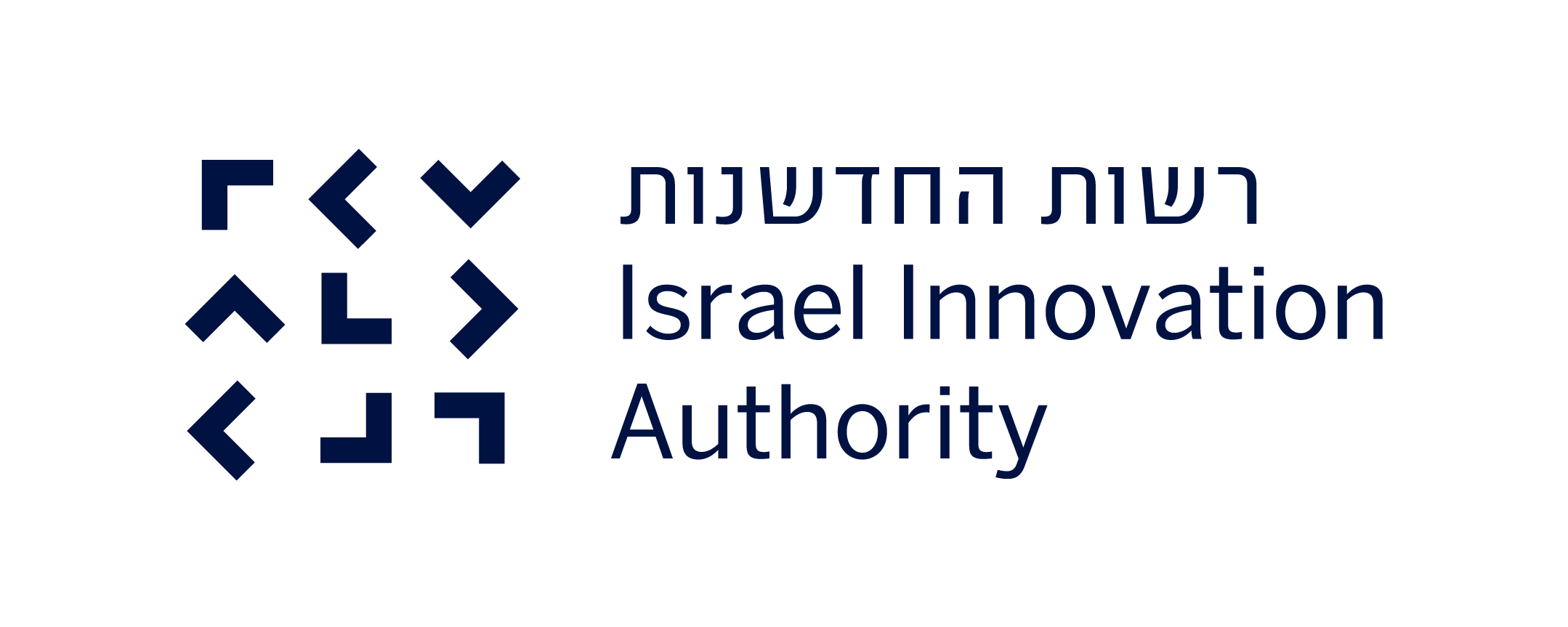
- Israel Innovation Authority

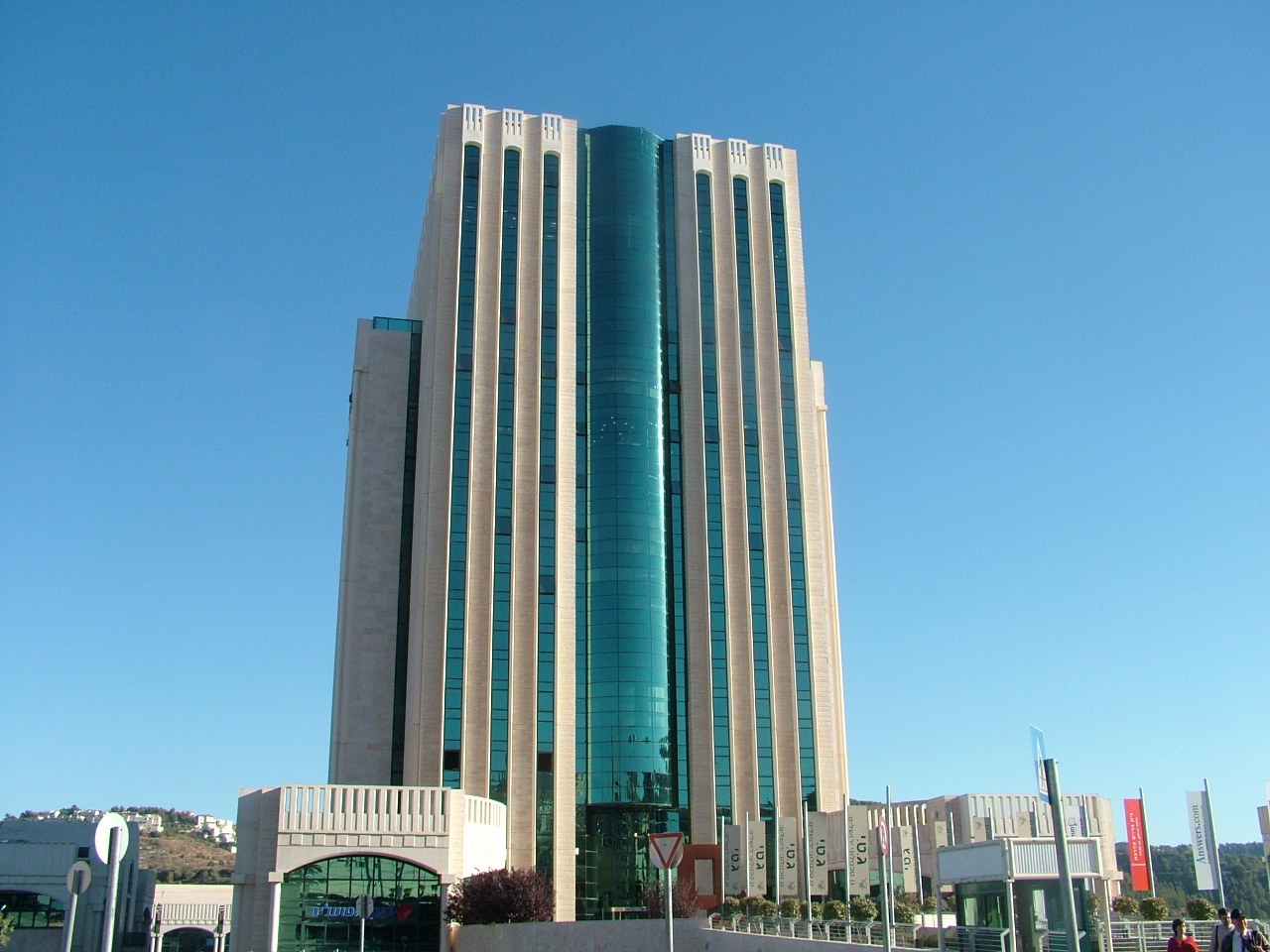
- Israel Innovation Authority offices in the Jerusalem Technology Park

Organization overview
- Formed: 1965 (as the Office of the Chief Scientist); 2016 (as the Israel Innovation Authority)
- Preceding Organization: Office of the Chief Scientist
- Type: Government agency
- Headquarters: Jerusalem Technology Park, Derech Agudat Sport Ha'poel 2, Jerusalem 9695102
- Employees: 140
- Organization executives: Dror Bin, CEO; Amiram Applebaum, Chairman
- Parent Organization: Ministry of Science, Technology and Space
- Website: https://innovationisrael.org.il/english

The Israel Innovation Authority (IIA) is the support and investment arm of the Israeli government, in charge of planning and executing the country’s innovation policy, promoting technological innovation and research and development (R&D) in the state of Israel.

The IIA offers a variety of investment programs that provide non-dilutive resources for entrepreneurs and companies of all sizes and stages within Israel. Most programs require matching funds from the private sector.

Funds and support programs include: Ideation Program (Tnufa), The Startup Fund, the Technological Venture Incubator Program, operating approximately 15 venture incubators across Israel, Technology Transfer Program, Applied Research in Academia Programs, Human Capital for High-Tech Fund, and more.

The IIA is also responsible for Iserd management within the European Union framework, as well as international R&D agreements and partnerships with countries such as the USA, Canada, Japan, South Korea, Singapore and more.

The IIA promotes diversification of Israeli high-tech in three different verticals – thematic (disciplinary), demographic, and geographic – launching a variety of programs for high-tech employment and entrepreneurship in Israel's periphery and among underrepresented social groups in the tech sector, such as women, Israeli Arabs and Ultra-Orthodox Jews (Haredim), as well as training programs in advanced and emerging technological fields that require talented human capital.

Until 2016, the IIA was known as the Office of the Chief Scientist (OCS) (Hebrew: המדען הראשי, romanized: Ha-madʿan ha-rashi) of Israel's Ministry of Economy. The IIA offices are located in the Jerusalem Technology Park, in the Malha neighborhood in Jerusalem.

== History ==
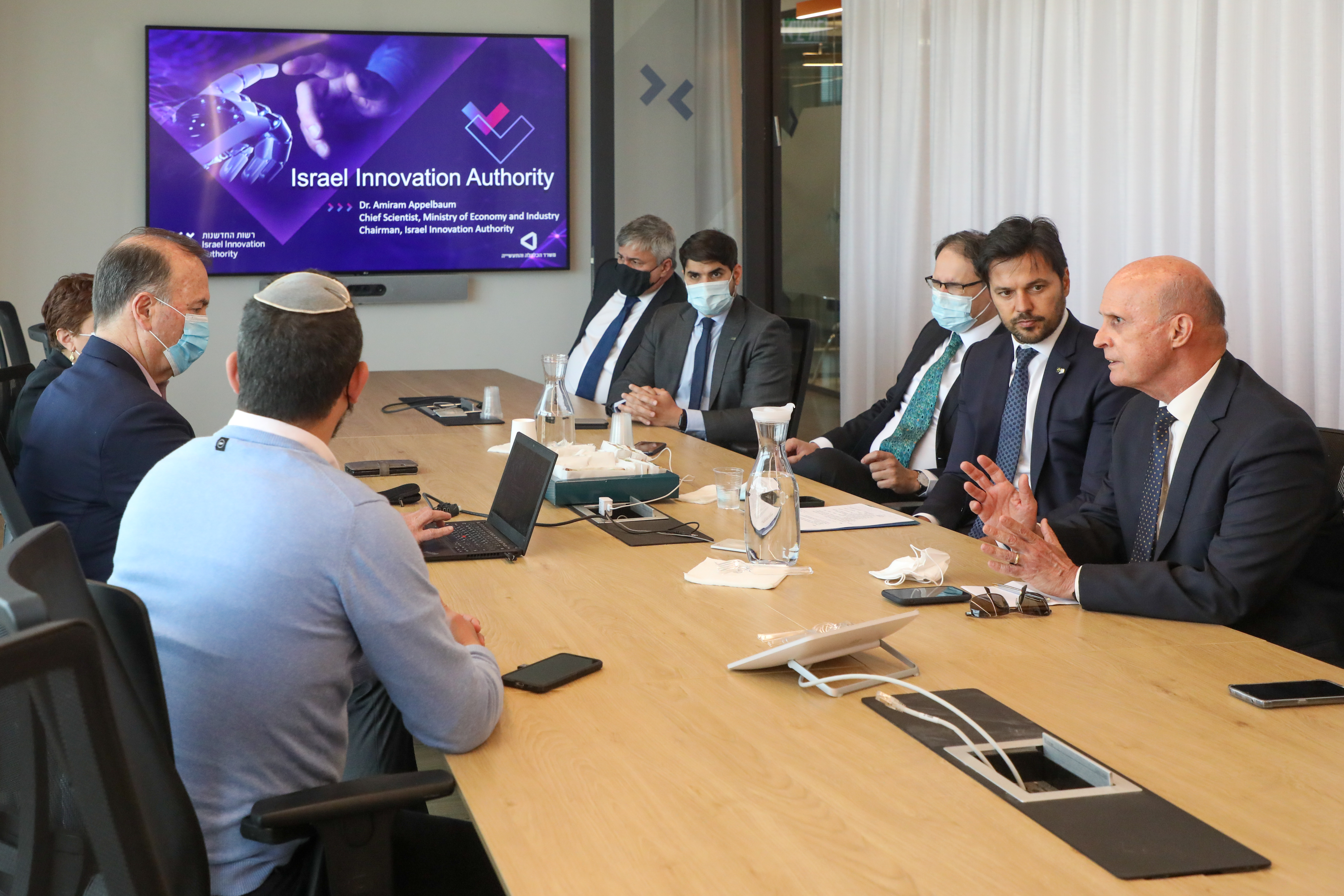
Fabio Faria visit to IIA, March 2022

The Office of the Chief Scientist was established in 1965. It was renamed the Israel Innovation Authority (IIA) in 2016. The main aim of the IIA is to increase economic empowerment within the civilian sector of the Israeli economy. Main activities include the funding of R&D and policy-making within its sphere of influence. The development and prominence of the OCS was further strengthened by the development of the venture capital industry within Israel in the 1990s.

The mission of the IIA has been defined through the country's "Law for the Encouragement of Industrial Research and Development—1984" (The R&D Law) and its operations are facilitated through Israel's R&D Fund, as well as a variety of international programs, agreements and collaborations. Its mission is to assist the advancement of Israel's knowledge-based science and technology industries in order to encourage innovation and entrepreneurship while stimulating economic growth.

Legal aspects of agreements which may include R&D funding, as well as royalties, are governed under the Regulatory Framework of the IIA.

According to the IIA, 54 percent of Israel's exports are high-tech products and services.

In 2022 the IIA led a delegation of Israeli startups fighting the Climate crisis, to the UN Climate Conference at Sharm el-Sheikh (COP27).

In October 2023, the IIA announced a 400m NIS matching fund for startup companies encountering difficulties because of the outbreak of Gaza war.

== Programs ==
=== Technological incubators ===
The Technological Incubators Program was established in 1991 and is designed for entrepreneurs interested in establishing a startup company based on an innovative technological concept. In addition to funding, the technological incubator offers a supportive framework for the establishment of a company and development of a concept into a commercial product, providing technological, business and administrative support. Incubators are selected through competitive processes for a license period of up to five years and are spread across Israel in sectors such as Medical Devices, Pharma, Bioconvergence, Agricultural technology, Foodtech, Renewable Energy and more. At any given time, there are about 15 active incubators in Israel. Startups in the Incubators Program typically receive a joint public-private investment of up to 5 million Shekels (Approximately 1.5M USD) for their first stages of development.

=== Yozma Program ===
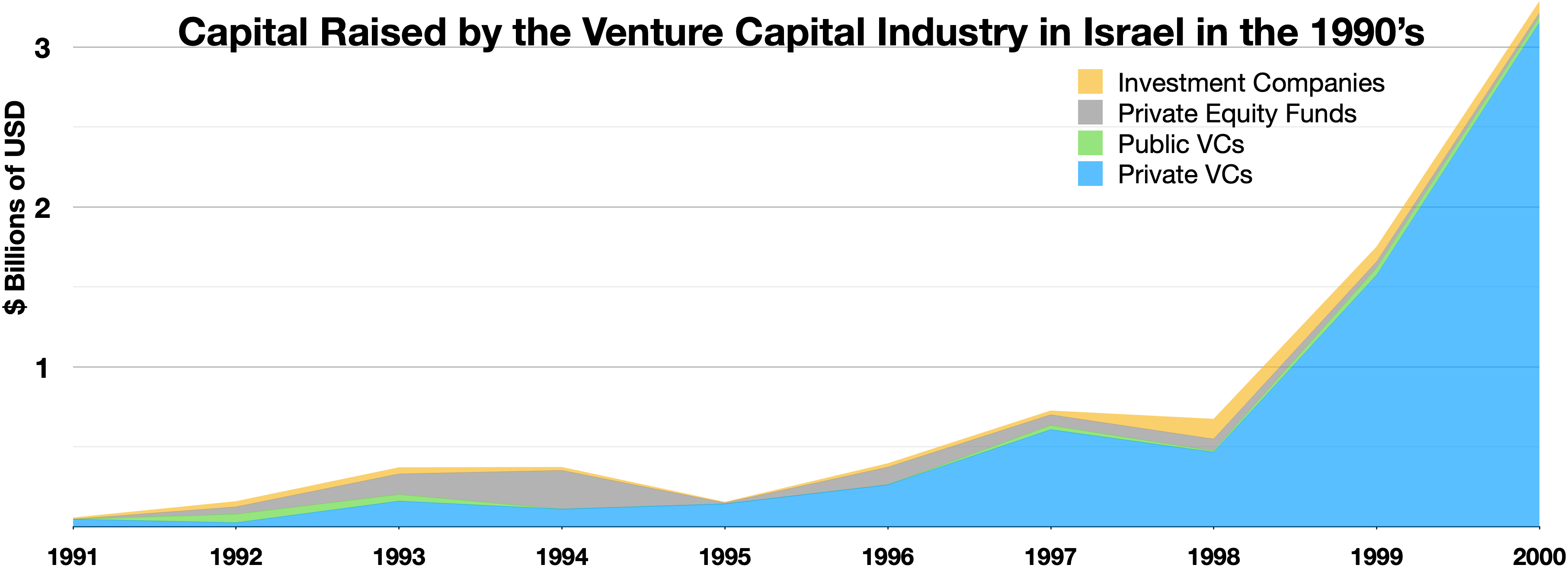
Capital raised by year in the venture capital industry in Israel during the 1990’s, ~$8 billion raised total

The Yozma Program started in 1993 and small government incentives induced a thriving venture capital scene in Israel.

=== Applied research ===
The Magnet Program was established in 1994, and manages the partnership between academic and commercial R&D programs. Significant activities include facilitation of the transfer of knowledge between academia and commercial R&D companies.

Under the auspices of the Magnet Program, the Nofar program was established to provide support and funding to applied research in fields such as biotechnology, nanotechnology and more.

== Chief scientists and CEOs ==
The following is a list of Chief Scientists of the Ministry of Economy (1965-2016).

Name	Term
Prof. (Brigadier General) Yitzchak Yaakov	1969–1977
Prof. Arie Lavie	1977–1983
Yigal Erlich	1984–1992
Dr. Yehoshua (Shuki) Gleitman	1993–1996
Dr. Orna Berry	1997–2000
Carmel Vernia	2000–2002
Dr. Eli Opper	2002–2010
Avi Hasson	2011–2016
Amiram Applebaum	2016-2023
Alon Stopel	2024–Present

The following is a list of CEOs of the Israel Innovation Authority (since 2016).

Name	Term
Aharon Aharon	2017–2021
Dror Bin	2021–Present
