= Rona Ramon =

CEO of Ramon Foundation (1964–2018)

- רונה רמון
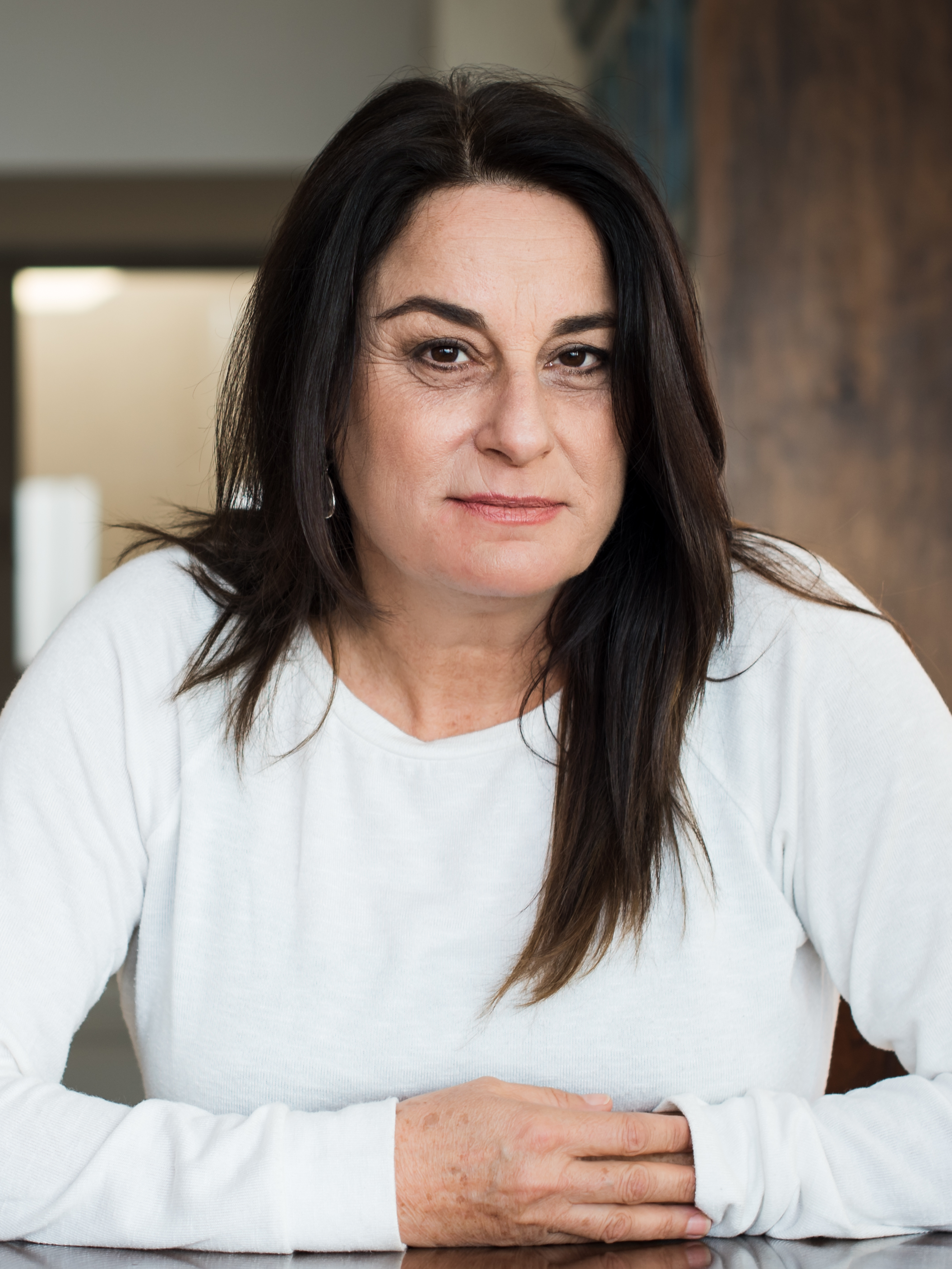
- Rona Ramon in 2016
- Born: Rona Bar-Siman-Tov; 16 April 1964; Kiryat Ono, Israel
- Died: 17 December 2018 (aged 54)
- Resting place: Ashes given to her family
- Occupation: Activist
- Known for: Widow of Ilan Ramon, public activist, STEM and youth influencer
- Spouse: Ilan Ramon (m. 1986; died 2003)
- Children: 4

Rona Ramon (Hebrew: רונה רמון; 16 April 1964 – 17 December 2018) was a public activist, STEM influencer and supporter of the education and advancement of youth in Israel. Ramon was the widow of Colonel Ilan Ramon, the first Israeli astronaut, who died in the Space Shuttle Columbia disaster in 2003. She was the mother of Captain Assaf Ramon, a fighter pilot in the Israeli Air Force who was killed in a training accident on 13 September 2009.

After the death of her husband and son, she established the Ramon Foundation, which encourages academic excellence for Israeli youth.

== Biography ==
Rona was born in Kiryat Ono, on 16 April 1964, to Israel and Gila Bar-Siman-Tov. Her parents emigrated from Turkey as part of the Youth Aliyah when they were 15 years old. As a youth, Rona volunteered in the Scouts movement. She served as a paramedic during her army service.

Rona met Ilan Ramon at the age of 22. They were married in 1986 and they had four children.

In 1997 Ilan Ramon was chosen as the first Israeli astronaut, and the family moved to Houston, in 1998, as part of the astronaut training and the preparations for STS-107.

Ramon was a holistic therapist, and gave lectures on the subject. She had a bachelor's degree in physical therapy from the Wingate Institute and a master's degree in holistic therapy from Lesley University in Massachusetts. She provided lectures, workshops and individual treatments on coping with crisis.

Following the Space Shuttle Columbia disaster, Ramon created the Ramon Foundation, promoting education and leadership to youth around Israel, providing scholarships and opportunities. Another program of the Ramon Foundation, the Ramon Spacelab, allows teams of students to submit an experiment to the International Space Station.

Ramon also helped found Israel's annual Space Week, the last week of January. It stages numerous events promote STEM education. Astronauts and Space Agency representatives come to participate in these events, as well as attending the Annual International Ilan Ramon Conference.

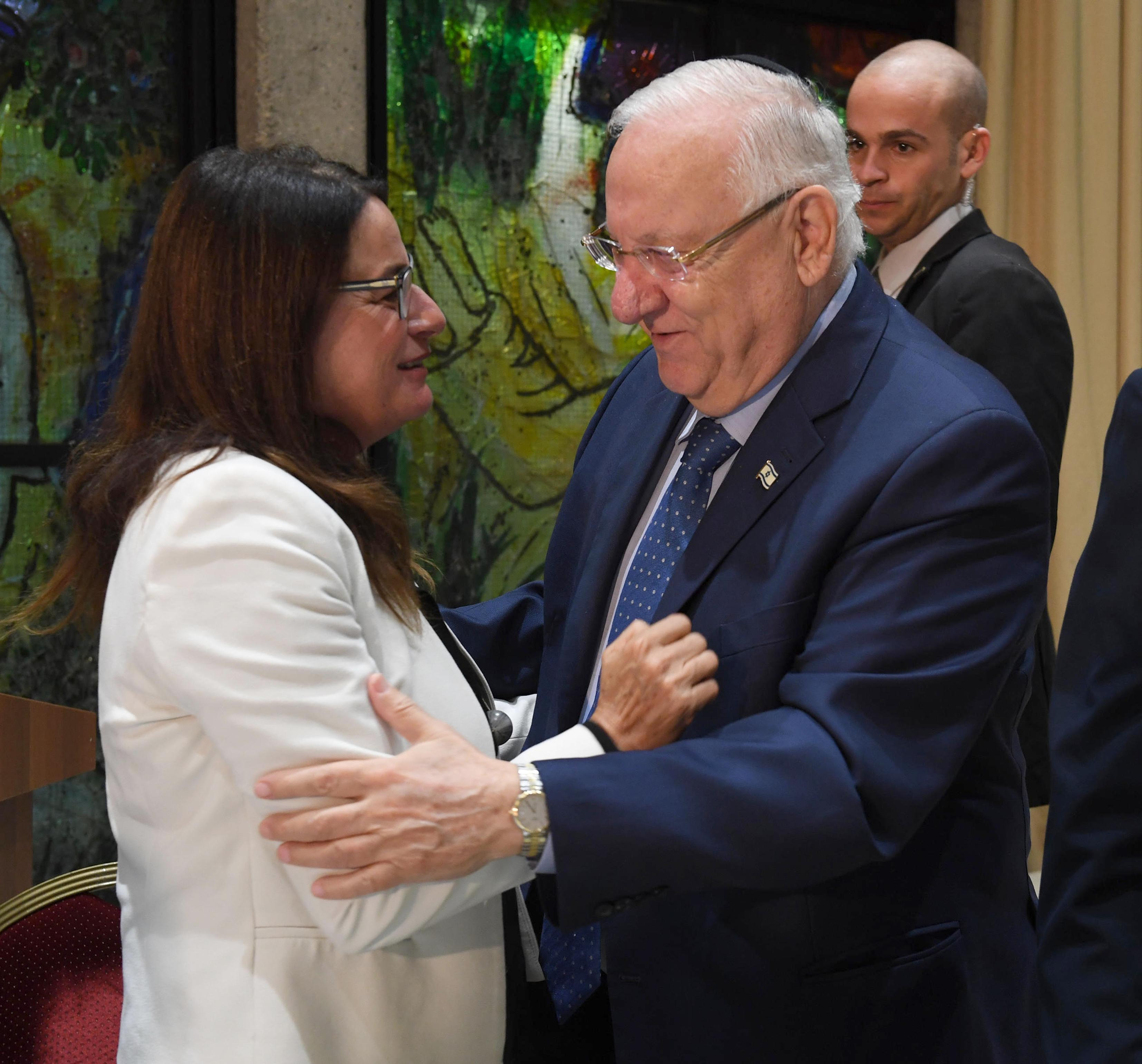
Rona Ramon with Israeli president Reuven Rivlin, November 2017

As part of Israel's 68th Independence Day celebrations, she held a torch at the annual torch lighting ceremony at Mount Herzl. In June 2018 she was awarded an honorary fellowship by the Technion, in recognition of her many years of work and contribution to Israeli Society.

She died at the age of 54 after a long battle with pancreatic cancer.

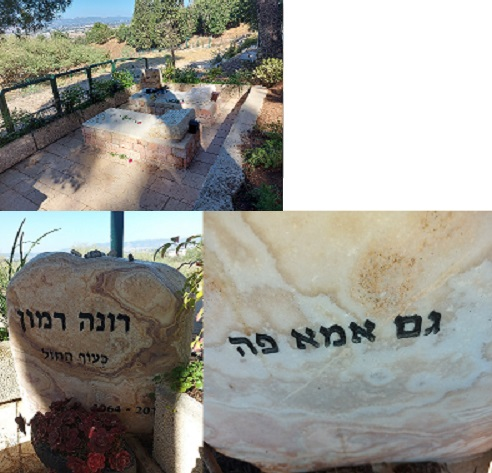
In the top photo: the tombstone of Rona Ramon next to the graves of Ilan and Assaf Ramon. In the left picture below is the front of the tombstone, and on the right the inscription on the back of the tombstone: "Mom is also here"
