= Columbia: The Tragic Loss =

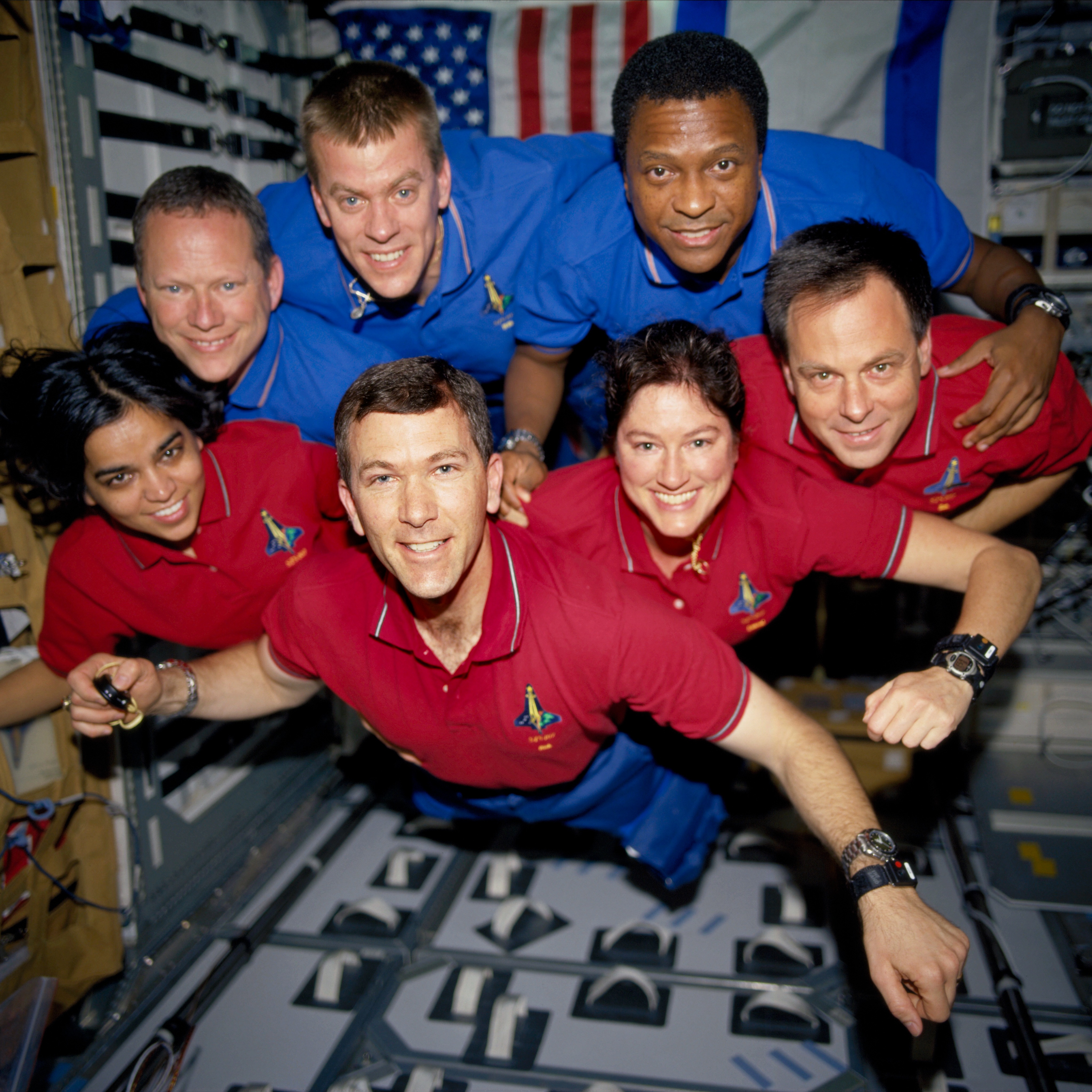
- Directed by: Naftaly Gliksberg
- Written by: Naftaly Gliksberg
- Produced by: Udi Zamberg and Michael Tapuach
- Release date: 2004
- Running time: 60 minutes
- Country: Israel
- Languages: English; Hebrew

Columbia: The Tragic Loss is a 2004 documentary film about the first Israeli astronaut Ilan Ramon, who died in 2003 when Space Shuttle Columbia disintegrated upon reentry into the Earth's atmosphere. Two months after the disaster, Ramon's diary was found at one of the crash sites and was reconstructed by the Israel Museum along with Israeli police. Interviews with NASA officials and with Ilan's family offer both expert analysis of the flight and a personal look at the tragedy.

The documentary received a special mention at the Houston International WorldFest Film Festival in 2004.

== Summary ==
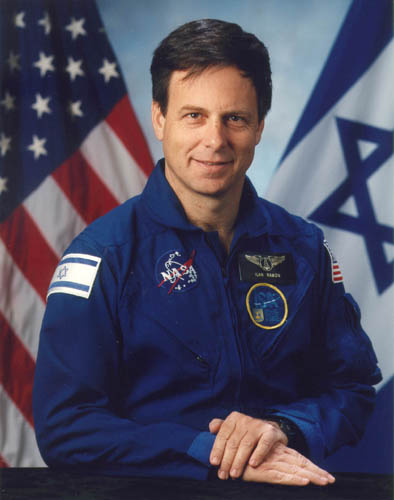
Payload specialist Ilan Ramon

Columbia shows interviews of both NASA officials in charge of the mission and critics of NASA, who were all devastated by the Space Shuttle Columbia disaster and are attempting to understand what went wrong. The film focuses on the reaction of the family of Ilan Ramon.

== Production ==
Filmmaker Naftaly Gliksberg has made a number of political documentaries, ranging from the assassination of Yitzhak Rabin to global anti-Semitism to an upcoming film about Iran–Israel relations in the 1990s.

Gliksberg met Ramon in Houston before his travels into space. Although much of Israel celebrated Ramon as a national hero, Gliksberg, initially, did not see him as a good subject for a documentary. "I'm a very cynical guy. I don't believe in human heroes," the director once said in a phone interview. In fact, Gliksberg told Ramon, jokingly, "You are a nonstory; you have no prostitute sister; you are from a very well-off family."

== Reception ==
Columbia has shown at a number of Jewish Film Festivals from 2004 to the present. In Variety, Joe Leydon said the film "pays heartfelt tribute to Ilan Ramon" and called the documentary scrupulously detailed.

== See also ==
- List of Space Shuttle missions
- Space science
