= 119 Squadron (Israel) =

Israeli military unit

- טייסת העטלף
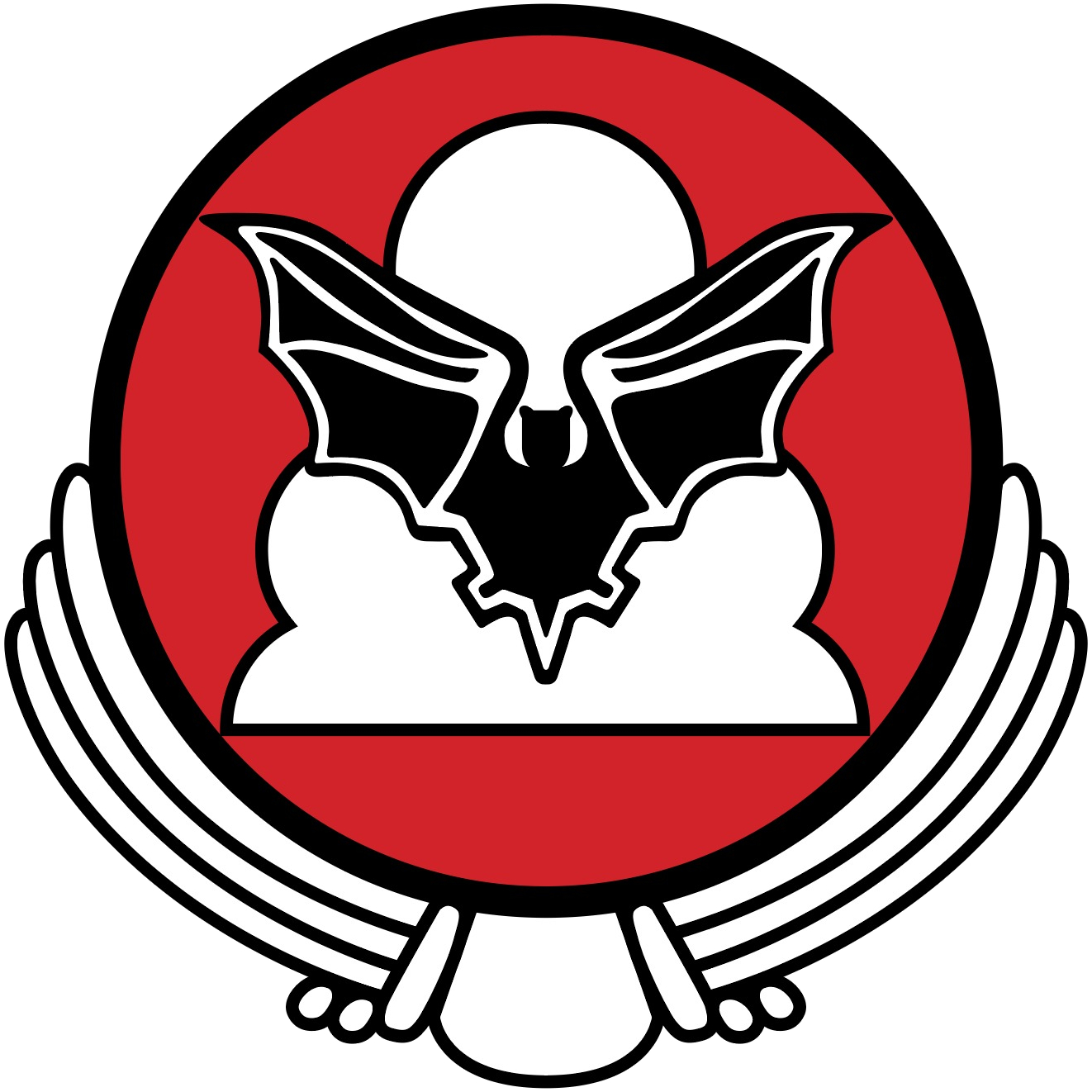
- Bat Squadron
- Active: 8 September 1956 – present
- Country: Israel
- Branch: Israeli Air Force
- Role: Air Defence
- Garrison/HQ: Ramon Airbase

Aircraft flown
- Fighter: F-16I Sufa

119 Squadron of the Israeli Air Force, also known as the Bat Squadron, is a Lockheed Martin F-16I Sufa fighter squadron based at Ramon Airbase.

== History ==
=== Meteor, Vautour and Mirage (1956–1970) ===
119 Squadron was first formed on 8 September 1956 at Ramat David Airbase, under the command of Yoash Tzidon. The squadron was equipped with the Gloster Meteor NF.13 (Night Fighter, two-seater), seeing its first two used jets from the Royal Air Force delivered in October 1956. The squadron participated in the Suez Crisis, but its operations were limited due to lack of crew and aircraft. However, 119 Squadron did shoot down an Egyptian Air Force Ilyushin Il-14 on 28 October 1956, the day before the conflict started. To bring the squadron closer to its operational area in Egypt, it was relocated to Tel Nof Airbase at the end of 1957.

In May 1958, 119 Squadron began to receive the French-built Sud Aviation Vautour IIN. The squadron continued to operate both the Meteor NF.13 and Vautour IIN until 1963, when the Meteor NF.13 was retired from Israeli service and the Vautours were transferred to 110 Squadron at Ramat David Airbase. This was done ahead of 119 Squadron's conversion to the Dassault Mirage IIICJ in March 1964.

119 Squadron fought in the Six-Day War, under the command of Ran Ronen-Pekker, where it emerged as the top scoring unit in the Israeli Air Force, with 19 air combat kills to two losses. Giora Romm became Israel's first ace during the conflict while serving the 119 Squadron. The squadron was also continually involved in the subsequent War of Attrition.

=== Kurnass (1970–2004) ===
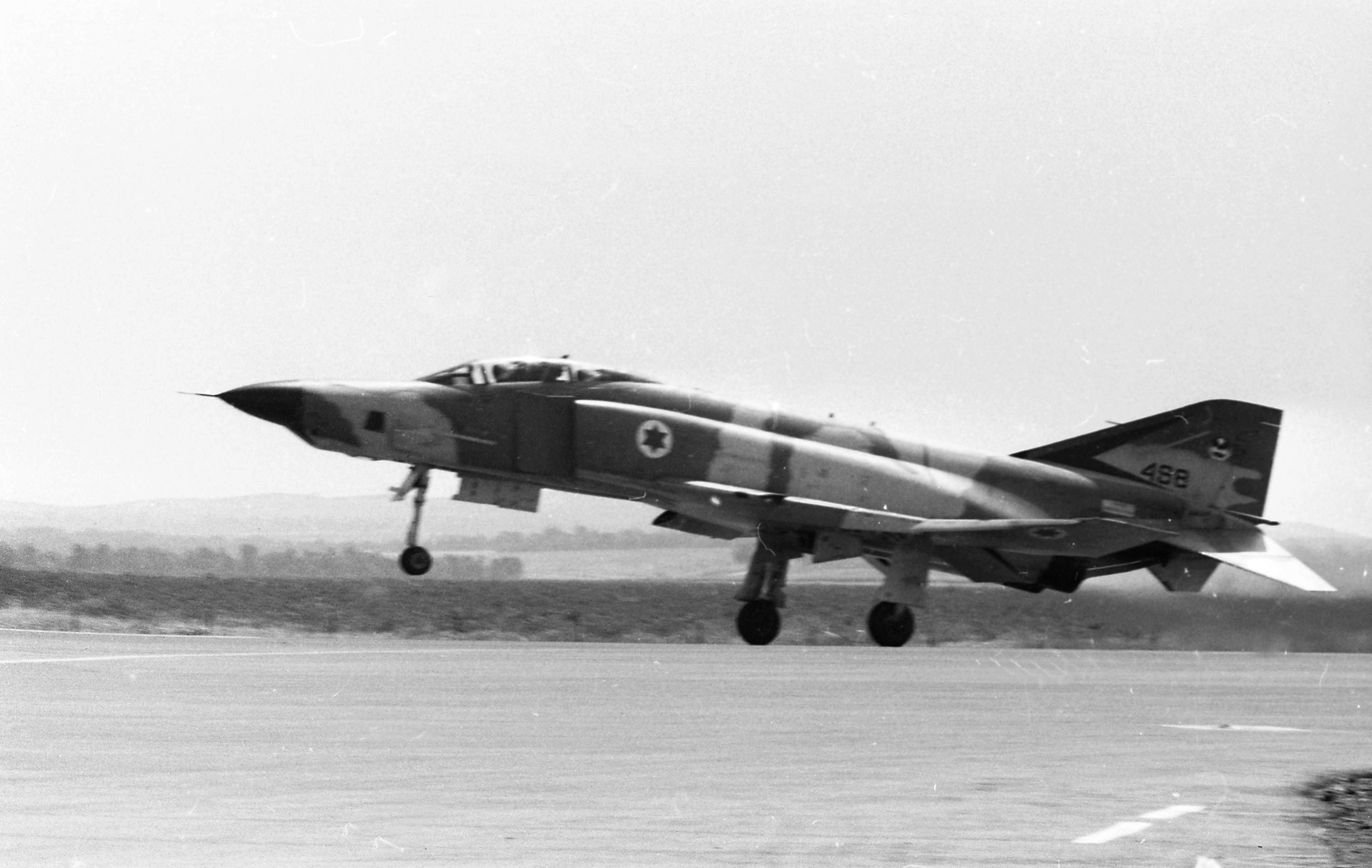
119 Squadron RF-4E Orev 458, 1974

In 1970, 119 Squadron relocated to Ramat David Airbase and began to convert to the McDonnell Douglas F-4E Kurnass. It also received a pair of RF-4E Orevs in 1971. The squadron fought in the Yom Kippur War in October 1973. During the war, 119 Squadron participated in the Syrian General Staff Headquarters Raid on 9 October. After the war, the squadron relocated back to Tel Nof Airbase.

119 Squadron fought in the 1982 Lebanon War.

In 1989, the squadron began to receive the upgraded F-4E Kurnass 2000, completing conversion by 1992. 119 Squadron continued to operate the Kurnass 2000 and Orev until their retirement in 2004.

=== Sufa (2004–present) ===
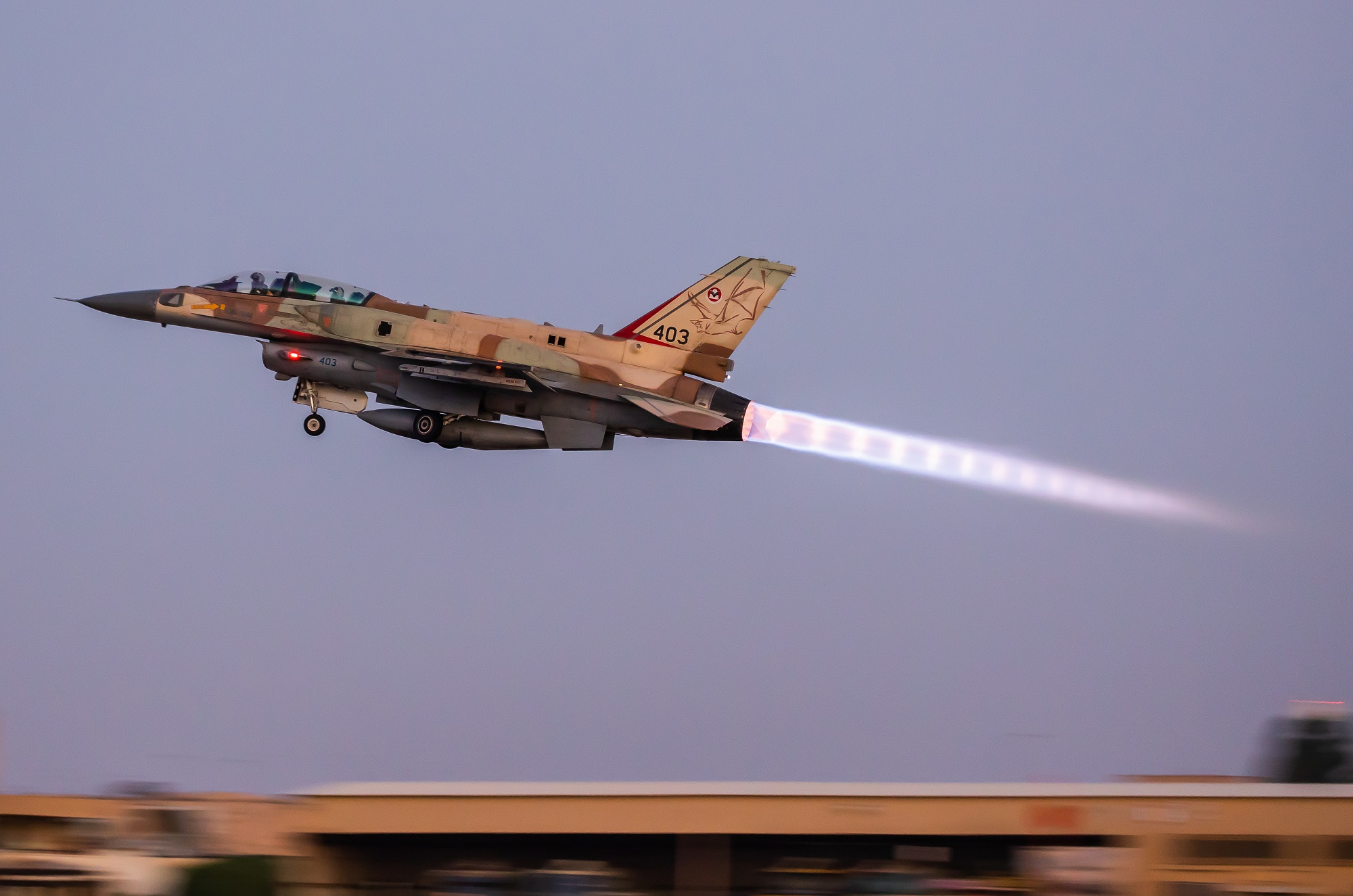
F-16I 453 of 119 Squadron, 2020

In 2004, 119 Squadron relocated to Ramon Airbase, swapping places with 157 Squadron, which moved to Ramat David Airbase. On 28 December 2004, the squadron received its first Lockheed Martin F-16I Sufas.

In March 2018, the IAF confirmed that 119 Squadron, together with Squadrons 69 and 253, took part in Operation Orchard. During a briefing prior to the mission, the commander of 119 Squadron wrote in his notes that the operation “will change the face of the Middle East.”

== Aircraft operated ==
Aircraft operated include:

- Gloster Meteor NF.13 (1956–1963)
- Sud Aviation Vautour IIN (1958–1963)
- Dassault Mirage IIICJ/CJ(R)/BJ (1963–1970)
- McDonnell Douglas F-4E Kurnass (1970–1992)
- McDonnell Douglas RF-4E Orev (1971–2004)
- McDonnell Douglas F-4E Kurnass 2000 (1989–2004)
- Lockheed Martin F-16I Sufa (2004–present)

== See also ==
- Operation Tarnegol
- 1973 Syrian General Staff Headquarters Raid
- Shimshon Rozen
