= Ramot at Tel Aviv University =

Israeli technology transfer company

Ramot at Tel Aviv University LTD. רמות ליד אוניברסיטת תל אביב
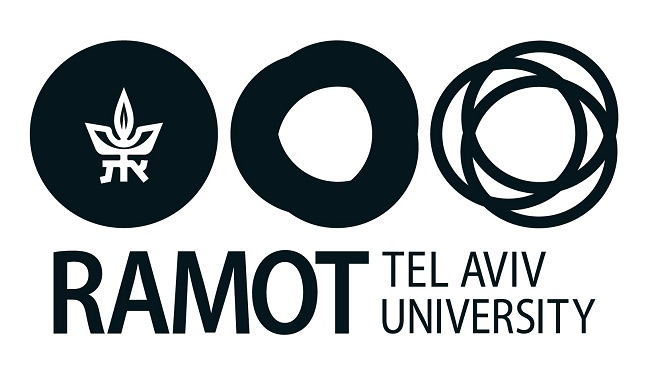
- Type: Private company
- Founded: 1973; 53 years ago
- Headquarters: Tel Aviv University, Tel Aviv, Israel
- Key people: Ronen Kreizman, PhD (CEO), (CEO)
- Owner: Tel Aviv University
- Website: ramot.org

Ramot at Tel Aviv University LTD is Tel Aviv University's technology transfer company, owner of the intellectual property created by the university's researchers and responsible for the commercialization of such intellectual property. The company is considered a leader in its field.

Ramot's mission is to facilitate the transfer of technology and knowledge from the university to the market, and to promote the commercialization of research and development (R&D) conducted at the university. To achieve this, Ramot works with researchers, entrepreneurs, and companies to identify and evaluate technologies and ideas with commercial potential, and to help protect and license these technologies through patents, trademarks, and other intellectual property (IP) rights. Ramot also provides support to startups and other companies that are based on Tel Aviv University technologies, including funding, business development, and access to university resources.

== History and activity ==
Ramot was founded in 1973. It is a private company, fully owned by Tel Aviv University. Ramot manages all of the university's commercialization activities – filing patent applications and maintaining patents claiming intellectual property invented by researchers of Tel Aviv University and granting licenses to relevant industrial partners with respect to such intellectual property. The company creates new business opportunities at the university, through the founding of start-up companies, granting of licenses to existing companies – Israeli and multi-national – and creation of business collaborations and partnerships with such entities.

Ramot identifies and engages with industrial partners to further develop discoveries and inventions created by Tel Aviv University’s researchers. It negotiates and executes license and research agreements with partners from a wide variety of industries to enable the development and commercialization of its technologies; raises research funding from industrial partners and from other sources, such as the Israel Innovation Authority and manages collaborations with industry and the transfer of materials and data from the university to industrial partners. Ramot is active mainly in the fields of engineering, computer science, medicine, biotechnology, food-tech, materials and medical devices.

== Activity ==
Updated as of 2020, Ramot has filed more than 5,000 patent applications that claim more than 1,300 inventions. 600 patents have been granted, approximately 400 of which by the United States Patent and Trademark Office.

The most notable transaction signed and managed by Ramot relates to one of the technologies on which the USB flash drive is based. This technology was patented by Ramot in 2004 and licensed to M-Systems around a year later. Ramot has collaboration agreements with international companies such as Pfizer, Teva, Bayer, Samsung, Google, Microsoft, Merck, Novartis, GSK and more.

In 2013, Ramot established the Momentum Fund, an investment fund solely dedicated to funding research and development of the university's technologies. Momentum Fund investors include the Indian conglomerate, Tata Group, and Temasek Holdings. The Momentum Fund raised close to US 24 million dollars and invested in 28 technologies, of which 5 have led to the creation of the start-up companies QArt Medical, Unispectral, Trobix, Multivu and Silib, and 13 of which are in various stages of research and development. The venture capital fund, TAU Ventures, is a subsidiary of Ramot and was created to invest in early-stage start-up companies founded by Tel Aviv University students and alumni in the hi-tech field. The fund provides mentoring, facilities and funding of between US 50 to 150 thousand dollars to its portfolio companies.
