= Operation Tarnegol =

1956 Israeli Air Force operation

- Part of the Suez Crisis
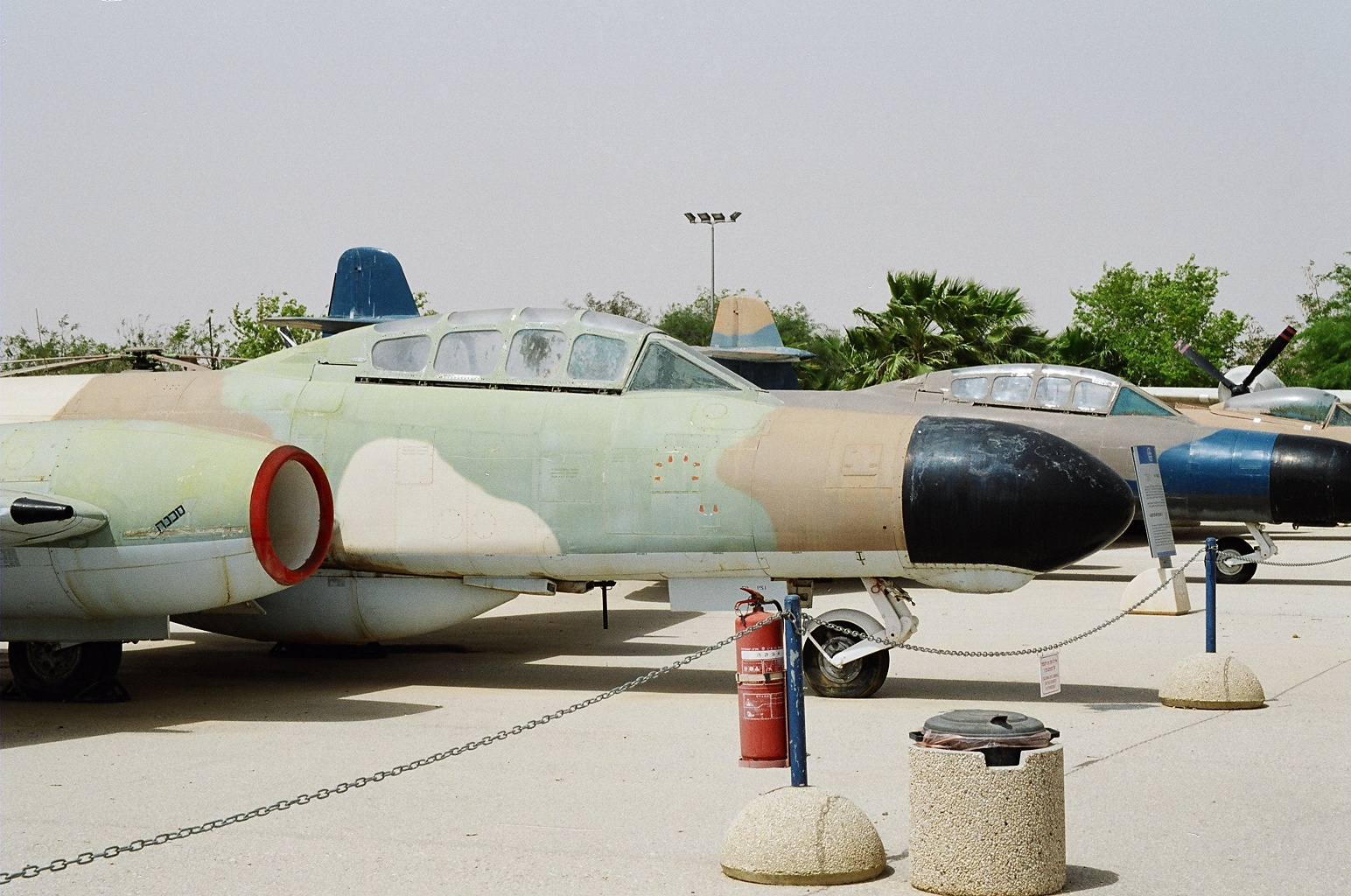
- Israeli Air Force Gloster Meteor NF. 13
Date	28 October 1956
Location	Mediterranean Sea, off Cyprus
Result	Israeli success

Belligerents
Israel	Egypt

Commanders and leaders
(Israel) Dan Tolkovsky	(Egypt) Mutawally †

Strength
1 Gloster Meteor NF. 13	1 Ilyushin Il-14

Casualties and losses
None	18 dead

Operation Tarnegol (Hebrew: תרנגול, lit. 'Rooster') was an Israeli Air Force operation carried out on the eve of the 1956 Suez Crisis. It witnessed an Israeli Gloster Meteor NF.13 intercept and destroy an Egyptian Ilyushin Il-14 carrying high-ranking members of the Egyptian General Staff en route from Syria to Egypt.

== Background ==
On 24 October 1956, as Israel, France and Britain were preparing for the launch of operations Kadesh and Musketeer, Abdel Hakim Amer, Egypt's defence minister and commander-in-chief, departed Egypt for a visit to Jordan and Syria. Early on Sunday, October 28, a day before operations were to commence, Israeli intelligence learned that Amer and the entire Egyptian General Staff were soon to depart Damascus for Cairo on board an Ilyushin Il-14. This presented an opportunity to incapacitate Egypt's high command on the eve of operations and the Israeli Air Force was tasked with shooting the aircraft down.

The IAF had only received its first three Meteor NF.13s, the night-fighting variant of the British jet, shortly before the outbreak of the Suez Crisis. Newly formed 119 Squadron, operating out of Ramat David and led by Major Yoash Tsiddon, was therefore shut down for the upcoming campaign and Tsiddon detailed to 117 Squadron as a regular Meteor pilot. Although neither Tsiddon nor his navigator Elyashiv Brosh had practised night intercepts since training, they were dispatched to take 119's lone serviceable aircraft and intercept the Ilyushin.

== Interception ==
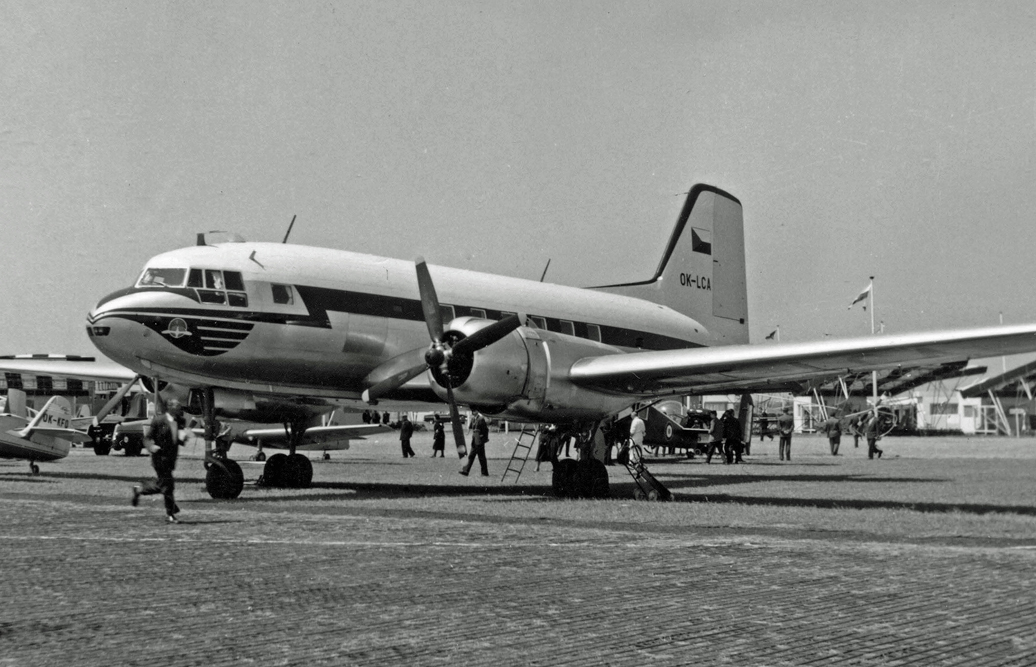
Czech Ilyushin Il-14

Late on 28 October, half an hour after the Ilyushin had reportedly left Damascus, Tsiddon and Brosh departed Ramat-David in Meteor 52. They had taken off with a maximum fuel load and external fuel tanks, but soon discovered that fuel would not flow from the external tanks and jettisoned both. Heading west over the Mediterranean, Tsiddon was 200 kilometres (120 mi) south of Cyprus when the aircraft's radar picked up a target 3 miles (4.8 km) away at 10,500 feet (3,200 m). Tsiddon closed in on the aircraft, slowed and circled it, counting the windows and attempting to trace the shape of its tail in the pitch-dark night. Clearly identifying it as an Ilyushin Il-14, Tsiddon pulled alongside the aircraft to peer inside. Spotting men clad in military uniform, he was certain he had located the correct target.

With the aircraft positively identified, IAF commander Dan Tolkovsky authorized Tsiddon over the radio to shoot it down. With a top speed of about 414 kilometres per hour (257 mph), however, the Ilyushin was flying barely faster than the Meteor's stall speed. Tsiddon slipped behind the Ilyushin and opened fire, but his cannons had been loaded with tracer rounds, whose glow temporarily blinded him from seeing the target. One of his guns jammed, and with two cannons firing on the left versus only one on the right, the slow flying aircraft entered a left-handed spin.

Tsiddon recovered control of the Meteor and closed in on his target again. His initial burst had damaged the aircraft's left engine and had apparently caused an electrical shortage, as no lights were apparent, but the Ilyushin was still flying. Coming in for a second pass, he dropped his flaps and aimed at the tip of the right wing, hitting the body as the Meteor once again yawed to the left. The Ilyushin "mushroomed to a huge fireball" and both aircraft entered an uncontrollable spin. Tsiddon regained control of the Meteor at 1,000 feet (300 m), only to see the burning Ilyushin disintegrate as it hit the water.

Ascending to 15,000 feet (4,600 m), Tsiddon discovered he was dangerously low on fuel. Directed to the closest IAF air base, he landed at Hatzor, his engines flaming out during taxi-in.

== Aftermath ==
Sixteen Egyptian officers and journalists and two crewmen were killed on board the Ilyushin. Intelligence soon reported, however, that Marshal Amer had not been present on the ill-fated flight. He had changed his plans and remained in Damascus, departing the Syrian capital on another aircraft. The IAF had considered intercepting and shooting down the second aircraft as well, but was dissuaded by fears of jeopardizing intelligence sources.

The Ilyushin Il-14 had been downed without reporting the attack. Egypt soon made a request to Britain on a humanitarian basis asking for help in searching for the missing plane, and both the British and Egyptians launched search operations, with aircraft scouring the Mediterranean for the plane for several days. The British passed on a request for assistance to Israel, and the Israeli Navy, which had not been informed of the operation, joined the search. The search flotilla was spotted by the IAF. As only the participants and a few high-ranking officers in the IAF were aware of the mission, the flotilla was assumed to be hostile, and a request was sent to the high command to call in the navy to engage the ships, which was denied.

Operation Tarnegol remained classified for 32 years and was only made public in January 1989. It was 119 Squadron's first aerial victory and the last for a Gloster Meteor flying for the IAF.
