= Bioconvergence =

Convergence of biology with other fields

Bioconvergence is a multidisciplinary industry that leverages the synergy between biology and engineering technologies to address challenges in life sciences and related fields. It is applied in diagnostic processes, material development, and pharmaceutical research. Beyond healthcare, bioconvergence has applications in sectors such as agriculture, energy, food, security, and climate.

== Implications ==
Bioconvergence combines methods from various disciplines, including biology, engineering, medicine, agriculture, computational sciences, and artificial intelligence (AI), to develop solutions for complex problems.

=== Healthcare ===
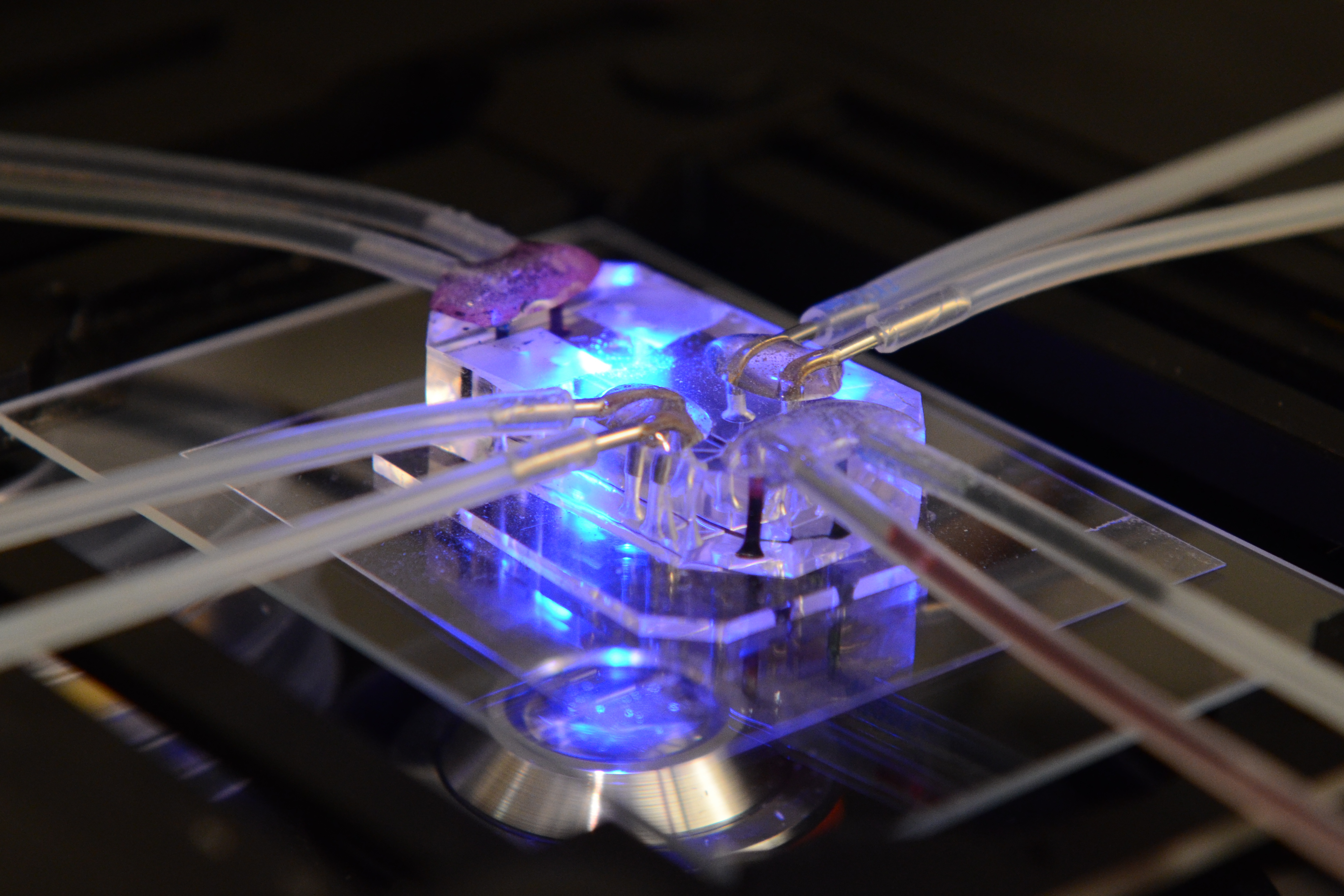
A lung on a chip, close-up

Bioconvergence in healthcare encompasses a range of technologies and applications, including:

- Translational medicine: Analyzing large biomedical datasets to inform clinical practice.
- Neuromorphic computing: Modeling neural structures to enhance computational efficiency and reduce energy consumption.
- Digital twins: Creating virtual replicas for clinical trial simulations.
- Biochips: Such as "organ-on-a-chip" systems that mimic organ functions for drug testing and disease modeling.
- Nanorobotics: For targeted drug delivery and minimally invasive procedures.
- Regenerative medicine: Utilizing 3D bioprinting to create tissues and organs for transplantation.
- Diagnostics and biological sensors: Developing advanced sensors for real-time health monitoring and point-of-care diagnostics.
- Optogenetics: Combining genetic engineering and optics to control cellular activities with light.
- Bioelectronics: Integrating electronics with biological systems for therapeutic applications, such as neural interfaces and bioelectronic medicines.
- Engineered living materials: Creating materials with biological properties for applications in medicine and beyond.

Additionally, bioconvergence enables personalized medicine by allowing for tailored treatment strategies based on individual genetic profiles and real-time health data. Belén Garijo, CEO of Merck, has highlighted the role of bioconvergence in advancing personalized medicine, stating that it will help power the next wave of human progress by transforming patient care with more precise, personalized, and predictive healthcare therapies.

=== Food and agriculture ===
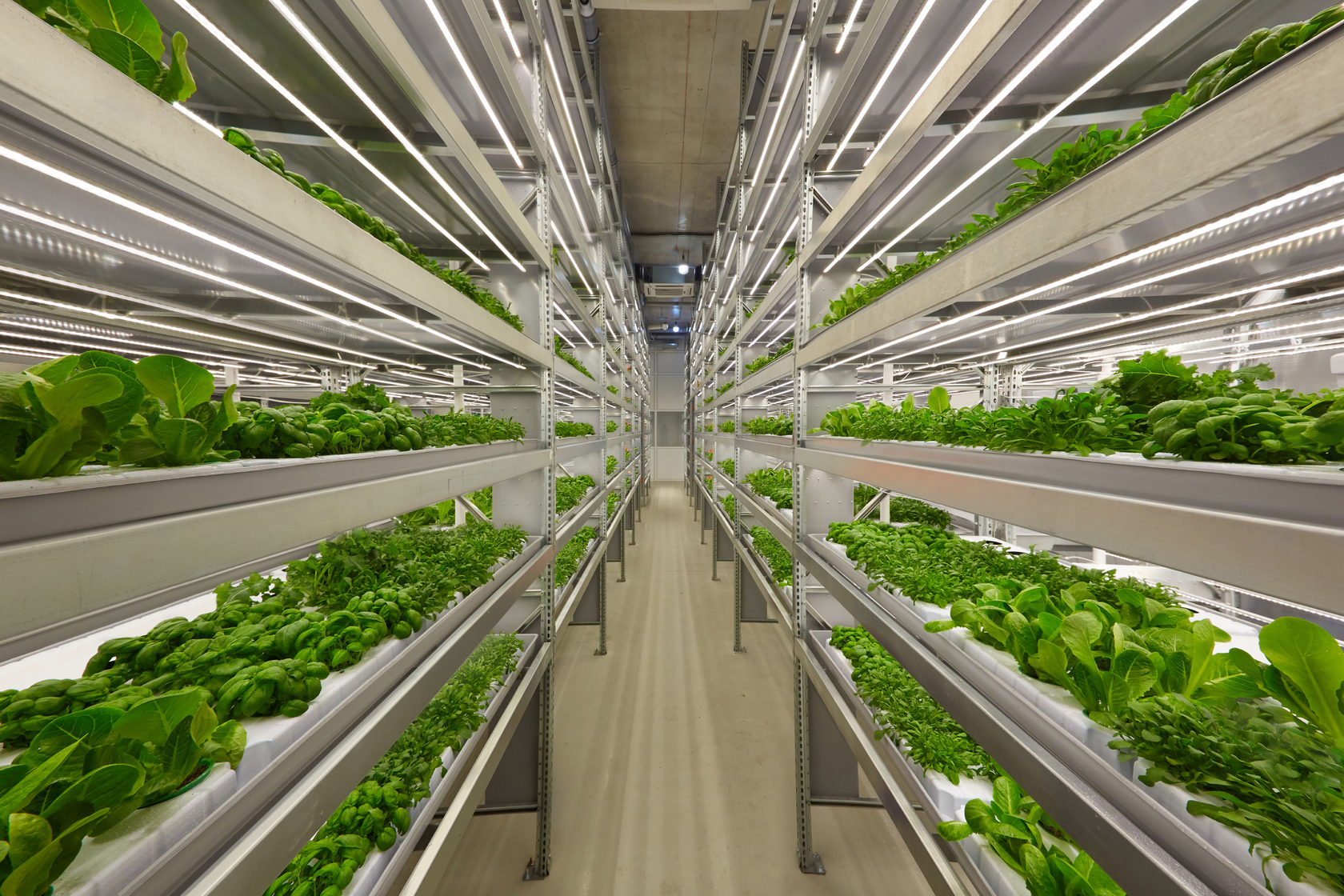
A vertical farm in Finland

Bioconvergence supports food production in controlled environments, such as laboratories and indoor vertical farms, reducing reliance on traditional agricultural resources like land, water, and specific climates. Applications include:

- Molecular breeding: Using molecular or genetic markers to accelerate and refine the breeding of plants and animals compared to traditional selective breeding.
- Genetic engineering: Developing precise tools for modifying plant genomes to enhance traits such as drought resistance or yield.
- Microbiome engineering: Manipulating the microbiomes of plants, soil, animals, or water to improve agricultural productivity and product quality.
- Alternative proteins: Producing cultured meat, alternative eggs, and alternative milk through cellular agriculture techniques.

These technologies aim to enhance food security and sustainability by optimizing resource use and increasing production efficiency.

=== Energy, climate, and advanced materials ===
Bioconvergence contributes to the natural resource sector by enabling alternative methods for producing raw materials and fuels. Applications include:

- Bio-based manufacturing: Using biological processes to produce materials and fuels, such as biofuels derived from engineered microorganisms.
- Sustainable materials: Developing biodegradable or bio-inspired materials to reduce reliance on non-renewable resources.
- Environmental management: Applying bioconvergence techniques to address climate challenges, such as carbon capture using engineered biological systems.

These approaches aim to reduce environmental impact and promote sustainable resource use.

== History ==
The term "bioconvergence" was used in 2005 to describe the integration of bio- and information-technologies into the healthcare industry. Since 2020, various initiatives and investments related to bioconvergence have emerged globally.

In April 2020, the European Investment Bank and the Israel Innovation Authority concluded a cooperation agreement to jointly pursue investments in the globally emerging domain of bioconvergence.

In March 2021, the US National Intelligence Council (NIC) published a research paper on the "Future of Biology", concluding that "During the next 20 years, a more multidisciplinary and data-intensive approach to life sciences will shift our understanding of and ability to manipulate living matter. These disciplines, combined with cognitive science, nanotechnology, physics, and others, are contributing to advances in biological understanding. It is anticipated that the collective application of these diverse technologies to the life sciences—known as bioconvergence— will accelerate discovery and predictability in biotech design and production."

In September 2021, CELLINK Life Sciences, a Swedish publicly traded company that commercialized the first bio-based ink in 2016, changed its group name to BICO Group, short for "bioconvergence." It is building a portfolio that blends biology, engineering, and computer science technologies and considering acquisition opportunities in bioconvergence technology companies.

In May 2022, Israel launched a 5-year national plan worth ₪435 million (US$127 million) to boost research and development in bioconvergence. Also in May 2022, Ben-Gurion University of the Negev (BGU) and Soroka Medical Center announced a strategic collaboration for the development of novel technologies in the field of bioconvergence.

In October 2022, Japan announced that it will establish a global center of bioconvergence innovation in the Okinawa Institute of Science and Technology. It will be supported by a grant from the Japan Science and Technology Agency program on Open Innovation Platform for Academia-Industry Co-Creation.

According to a McKinsey report on public policy and "Biological innovations for complex problems", the Israel Innovation Authority is "investing in bioconvergence technologies to ensure that professionals in biology, computer science, mathematics, engineering, and nanoscience work seamlessly together". The Israel Innovation Authority views bioconvergence as potentially "one of the next significant growth engines of Israeli high-tech".

== Market ==
According to research company named Grand View Research, the global bioconvergence market was valued at USD 110.9 billion in 2021 and is anticipated to expand at a compound annual growth rate (CAGR) of 7.4% from 2022 to 2030. This growth is attributed to factors including the increasing elderly population and advances in stem cell technology aimed at repairing damaged cells, tissues, and organs. Research by McKinsey & Company indicates that the majority of bioconvergence's potential uses fall outside the healthcare sector, in areas like agriculture, aquaculture, consumer products, novel materials, chemistry, and energy. McKinsey estimates that bioconvergence solutions currently under development could generate an economic impact of up to US$4 trillion annually within the next 10 to 20 years.
