= Ilan Ramon =

Israeli fighter pilot and astronaut (1954–2003)

- אילן רמון
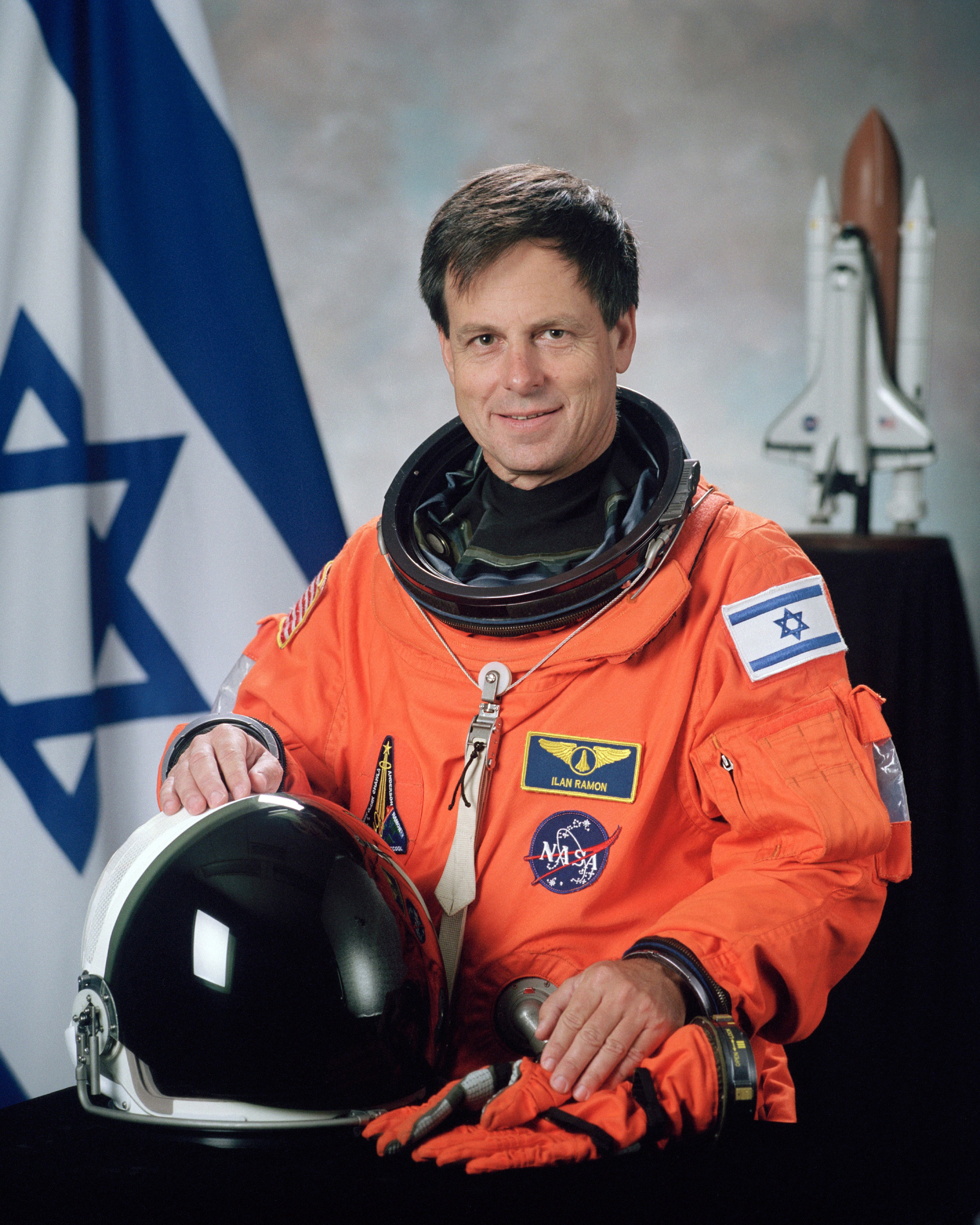
- Ramon in 2001
- Born: Ilan Wolfferman; June 20, 1954; Ramat Gan, Israel
- Died: February 1, 2003 (aged 48) over Texas, U.S.
- Cause of death: Space Shuttle Columbia disaster
- Education: Tel Aviv University (BSc)
- Awards: Congressional Space Medal of Honor; NASA Distinguished Service Medal
- Space career

ISA astronaut
- Previous occupation: Fighter pilot
- Rank: Colonel, Israeli Air Force
- Time in space: 15d 22h 20m
- Selection: 1996 NASA Group
- Mission: STS-107

Ilan Ramon (Hebrew: אילן רמון, pronounced [(ʔ)iˈlan ʁaˈmon]; June 20, 1954 – February 1, 2003) was an Israeli fighter pilot and later the first Israeli astronaut. He served as a Space Shuttle payload specialist on STS-107, the fatal mission of Columbia, in which he and the six other crew members were killed when the spacecraft disintegrated during re-entry. At 48, Ramon was the oldest member of the crew. He is the first foreign recipient of the United States Congressional Space Medal of Honor, which was awarded posthumously.

== Biography ==
Born as Ilan Wolfferman in Ramat Gan, Israel, to Tonya (1929–2003) and Eliezer Wolfferman (1923–2006), a family of Ashkenazi Jewish descent, Ramon grew up in Beersheba. His father was from Germany, and his family fled Nazi persecution in 1935. His mother and grandmother were from Poland, and were Holocaust survivors, having been in Auschwitz. They emigrated to Israel in 1949. Ramon's first name, Ilan, means "tree" in Hebrew. Ramon Hebraizied his surname from Wolfferman to Ramon, a more "Israeli (Sabra)" name, when he joined the Israeli Air Force (IAF). This was customary and expected of IAF pilots, as well as among IDF senior officers at the time.

Ramon graduated from high school in 1972. In 1987, he graduated with a B.Sc. degree in electronics and computer engineering from Tel Aviv University.

== Air Force career ==
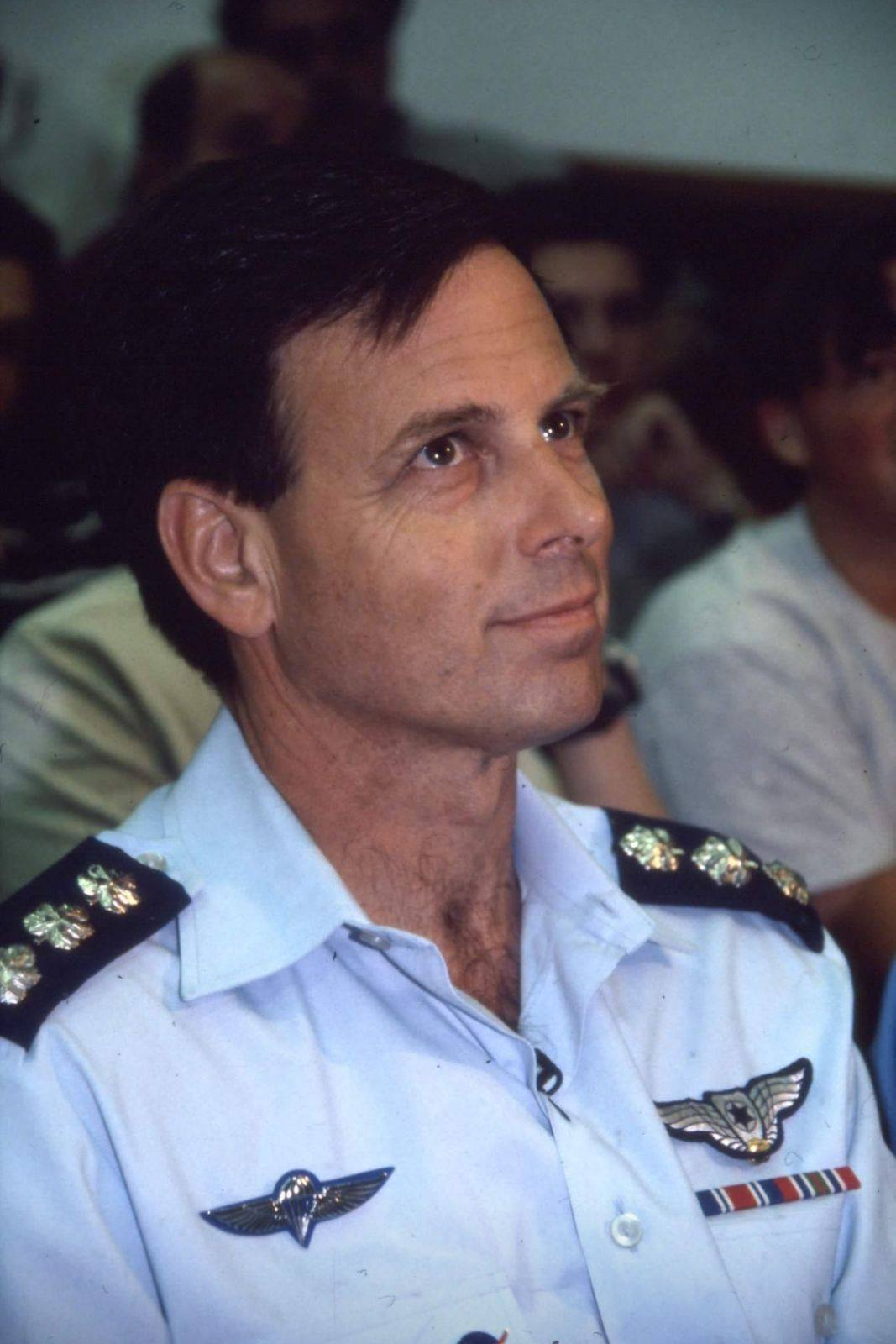
Ramon as a Colonel in the Israeli Air Force

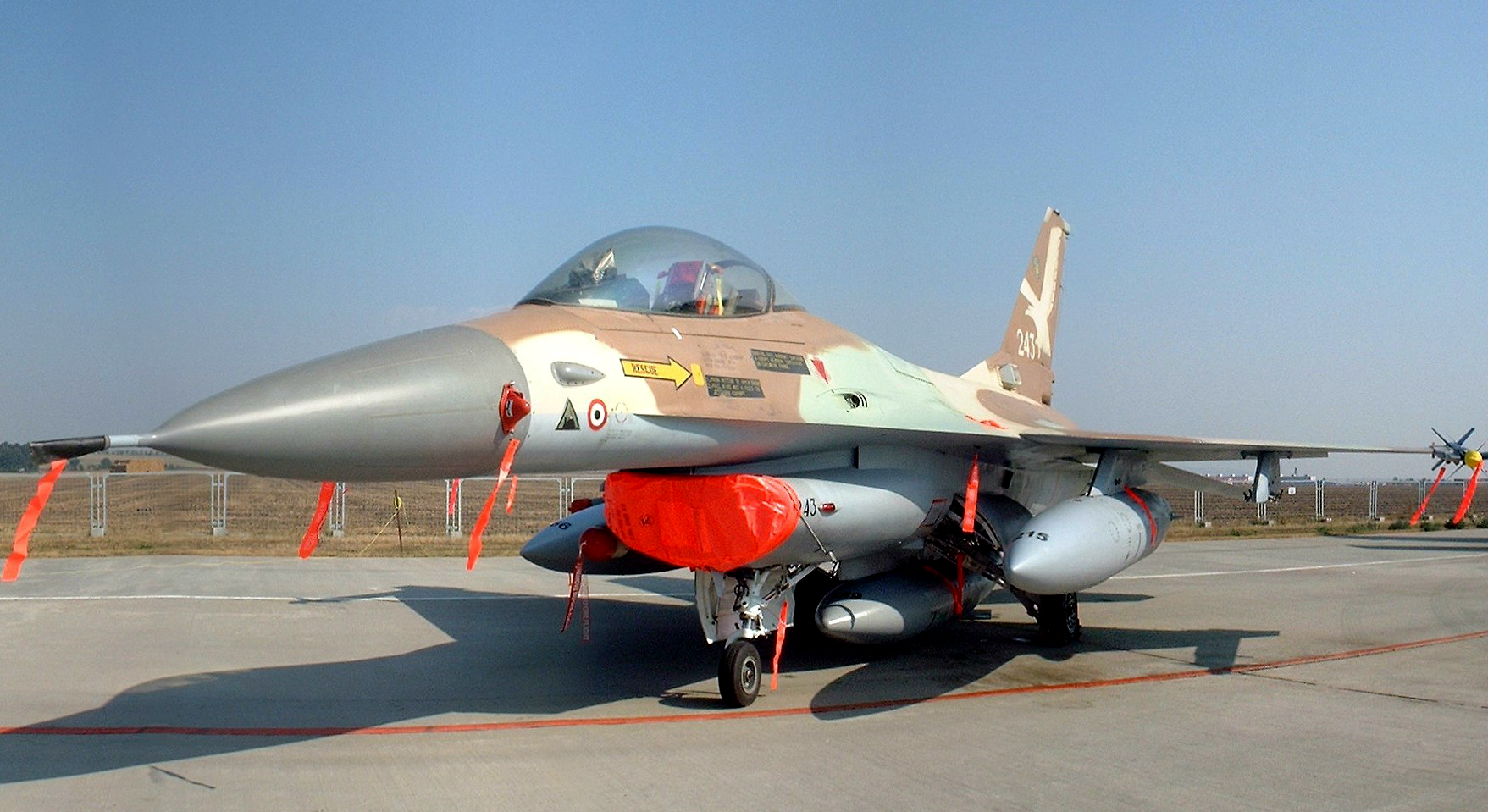
The F-16 Netz #243 flown by Ramon in Operation Opera. The green and black triangular emblem on the nose commemorates the attack.

Ramon was a Colonel (Aluf Mishne) and a fighter pilot in the Israeli Air Force, with thousands of hours of flying experience. He began the fighter pilot's course at the Israeli Air Force Flight Academy in 1972, but was forced to suspend his studies after breaking his hand. Ramon served in an electronic warfare unit in the Sinai during the Yom Kippur War, and afterwards, returned to the flight academy. He graduated from the fighter pilots' course in 1974. From 1974 to 1976, Ramon participated in A-4 Skyhawk Basic Training and Operations. From 1976 to 1980, he participated in training and operations for the Mirage IIIC. In 1980, as one of the IAF's establishment team of the first F-16 Squadron in Israel, Ramon attended the F-16 Training Course at Hill Air Force Base, Utah. From 1981 to 1983, he served as the Deputy Squadron Commander B, F-16 Squadron.

In 1981, Ramon was the youngest pilot taking part in Operation Opera, Israel's strike against Iraq's unfinished Osiraq nuclear reactor. The facility was destroyed, killing ten Iraqi soldiers and one French researcher. Ramon also flew in the 1982 Lebanon War.

After attending Tel Aviv University, Ramon served as Deputy Squadron Commander A, 119 Squadron, flying the F-4 Phantom (1988–1990). In 1990, he attended the Squadron Commanders Course and between 1990 and 1992, commanded 117 Squadron, flying the F-16. From 1992 to 1994, Ramon was head of the Aircraft Branch in the Operations Requirement Department. In 1994, he was promoted to the rank of colonel and assigned as head of the Department of Operational Requirement for Weapon Development and Acquisition. Ramon stayed at this post until 1998.

Ramon accumulated over 3,000 flight hours on the A-4, Mirage IIIC, and F-4, and over 1,000 flight hours on the F-16.

== NASA experience ==
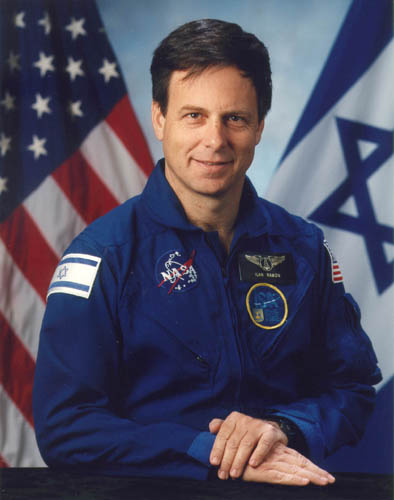
Ramon in November 2001

=== NASA on-ground trainings ===
In 1997, Ramon was selected as a Payload Specialist. He was designated to train as prime for a space shuttle mission with a payload that included a multispectral camera for recording desert aerosol (dust). In July 1998, Ramon reported for training at the Johnson Space Center in Houston, Texas, where he trained until 2003. Ramon flew aboard STS-107, logging 15 days, 22 hours and 20 minutes in space.

=== Space flight: STS-107, Space Shuttle Columbia ===
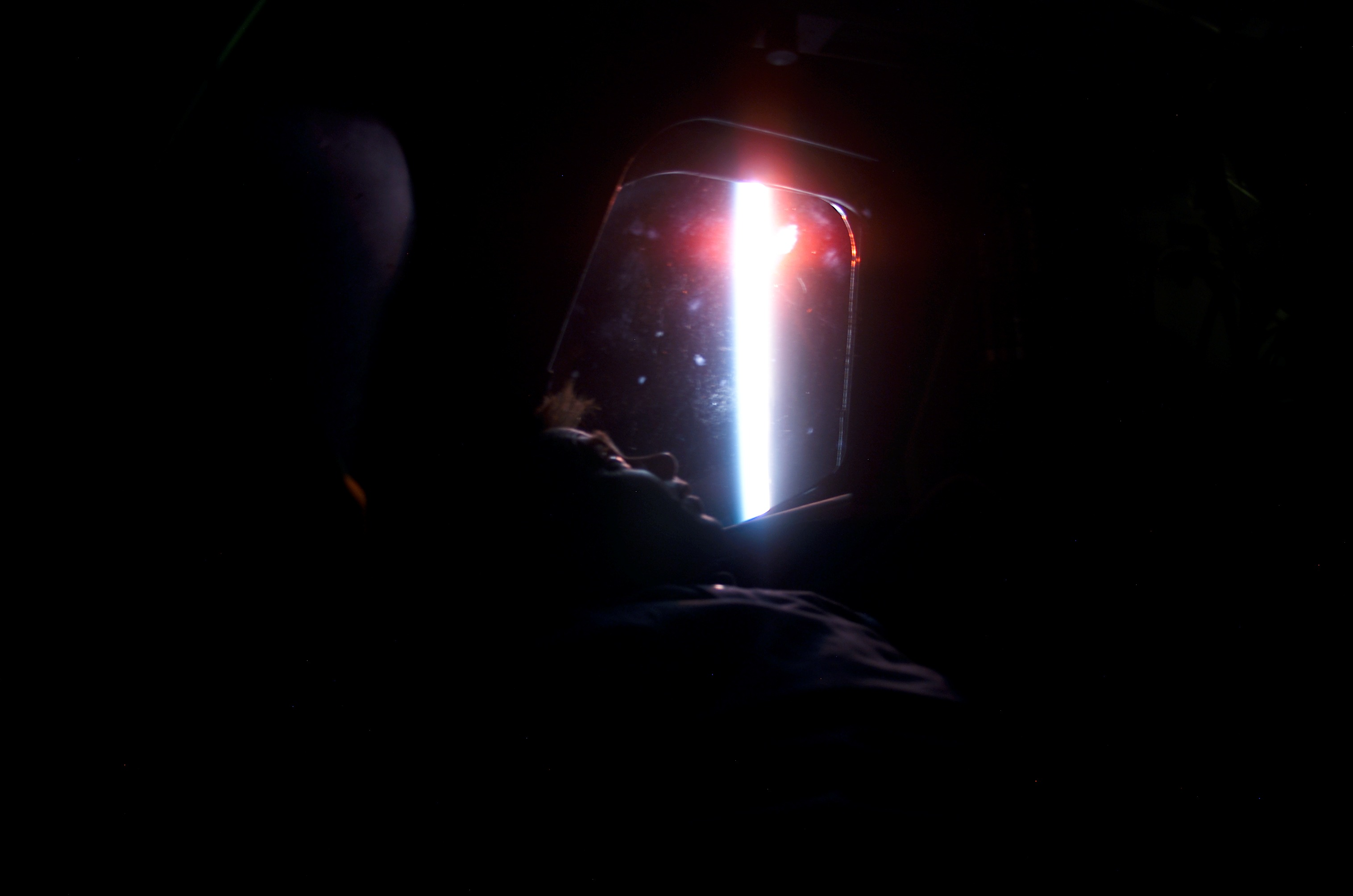
Ramon photographed aboard Columbia on January 26, 2003

STS-107 Columbia (January 16 – February 1, 2003), a 16-day flight, was a dedicated science and research mission. Working 24 hours a day, in two alternating shifts, the crew successfully conducted approximately 80 experiments.

Personally nonreligious, Ramon performed traditional observance while in orbit: "I feel I am representing all Jews and all Israelis." He was the first astronaut to request kosher food and marked the Sabbath. Ramon, whose mother and grandmother were survivors of Auschwitz, was asked by S. Isaac Mekel, director of development at the American Society for Yad Vashem, to take an item from Yad Vashem aboard STS-107. Ramon carried with him a pencil sketch, Moon Landscape, drawn by 16-year-old Petr Ginz, who was murdered in Auschwitz. Ramon also took with him a microfiche copy of the Torah given to him by Israeli president Moshe Katsav and a miniature Torah scroll (from the Holocaust) that was given to him by Prof. Yehoyachin Yosef, a Bergen Belsen survivor. Ramon asked the 1939 Club, a Holocaust survivor organization in Los Angeles, for a symbol of the Holocaust to take into outer space with him. A barbed wire mezuzah by the San Francisco artist Aimee Golant was selected. Ramon also took with him a dollar of the Lubavitcher Rebbe, Rabbi Menachem M. Schneerson.

Ramon and the rest of the Columbia crew died over East Texas in the Southern United States during entry into Earth's atmosphere, 16 minutes before scheduled landing.

=== Diary ===
Among the recovered 40% from the contents of the Columbia Space Shuttle that broke up over Texas were 37 pages of Ramon's diary, which NASA returned to his wife. His widow, Rona, shared an excerpt with the Israeli public in a display at Jerusalem's Israel Museum. Rona Ramon brought it to Israel Museum forensic experts. Only two pages were displayed, one containing Ramon's notes, and the other is a copy of the Kiddush prayer. Curator Yigal Zalmona said the diary was partially restored in one year, and needed four more, for police scientists to decipher 80% of the text. Zalmona stated: "The diary survived extreme heat in the explosion, extreme atmospheric cold, and then was attacked by microorganisms and insects. It's almost a miracle that it survived — it's incredible. There is 'no rational explanation' for how it was recovered when most of the shuttle was not." Ramon wrote on the last day of the journal:

Today was the first day that I felt that I am truly living in space. I have become a man who lives and works in space.

Inscribed in black ink and pencil, it covered the first six days of the 16-day mission.

== Family ==
Ramon was survived by his wife, Rona, and their four children: Assaf, Tal, Yiftah, and Noa, who were in Florida at the time of the accident. Ramon's widow, Rona Ramon, served in the Israel Defense Forces as a paramedic and later earned a BA at the Wingate Institute. After Assaf's death, she returned to university and graduated with a master's degree in holistic health at Lesley University, Massachusetts. She also lectured about dealing with grief and finding coping mechanisms. Rona served as founding CEO of the nonprofit Ramon Foundation for youth academic excellence and social leadership through science and technology. She died of pancreatic cancer on December 17, 2018. She was posthumously awarded the Israel Prize for lifetime achievement.

Ramon's eldest son, Assaf (February 10, 1988 – September 13, 2009), died at age 21 during a routine training flight while piloting his F-16A, three months after graduating from the IAF flight school Hatzerim Airbase as the top cadet in his class. Assaf lost consciousness during a spell of vertigo, as a result of the high speed and G-force conditions to which he was subjected. This led to the plane crash and Assaf's subsequent death. He was considered an excellent pilot. A lieutenant of the Israeli Air Force, he was posthumously promoted to the rank of captain.

On November 10, 2013, the American Society for Yad Vashem held a special event with the participation of Ramon's son, Tal, who performed a song he wrote in memory of his father. Tal Ramon performed his debut album, Dmut, at the club Zappa Tel Aviv in 2016.

== Awards and honors ==
- Military decorations:
  - Yom Kippur War campaign ribbon (1973)
  - 1982 Lebanon War campaign ribbon (1982)
  - F-16 1,000 Flight Hours (1992).
- Posthumously awarded:
  - IDF Chief of Staff Medal of Appreciation
  - Congressional Space Medal of Honor (Ramon is the only non-U.S. citizen recipient to date)
  - NASA Space Flight Medal

== Namesakes ==
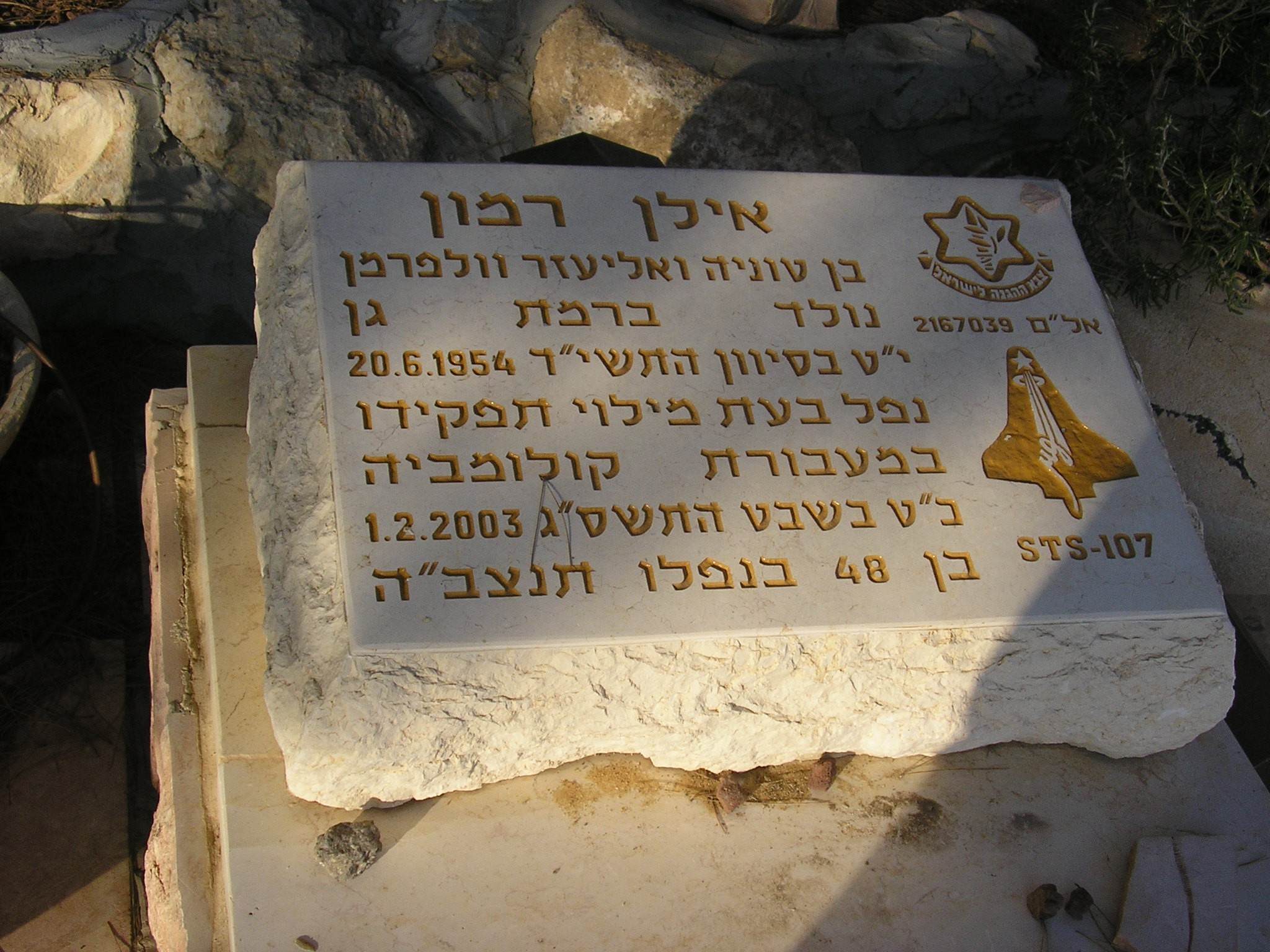
Ilan Ramon's grave in Nahalal

=== In Israel ===
- Ramon Airport, named in honor of Ilan and Assaf Ramon
- The international Ilan Ramon Conference, hosted by the Israel Space Agency
- Ilan Ramon Youth Physics Center, Ben-Gurion University of the Negev, Beersheba
- Ramon Control Tower, Ben-Gurion Airport
- Ilan Ramon Elementary School, Be'er Ya'akov
- Ilan Ramon Elementary School, Jerusalem
- Ilan Ramon Junior High School, Kfar Saba
- Ilan Ramon Elementary School, Netanya
- Ilan Ramon Elememtary School, Hadera
- Ramon Elementary School, Modi'in
- Ramon High School, Hod Hasharon
- Ilan Ramon Junior High, Kokhav Ya'ir
- Ilan Ramon Emergency Center, Kaplan Hospital, Rehovot
- Ramon Park, Givat Shmuel
- Ilan Ramon Park, space-themed playground, Beersheba
- Ramon.Space, an aerospace electronics company, multinational

=== In Canada ===
- Ilan Ramon Boulevard, Vaughan, Ontario, Canada
- Ilan Ramon Crescent, Côte-Saint-Luc (Montreal), Quebec, Canada

=== In the United States ===
- Ramon Hall, in the Columbia Village apartments, Florida Institute of Technology
- Ilan Ramon AZA #380, Boulder, Colorado
- Ilan Ramon BBYO #5378, Oviedo, Florida
- Ramon AZA #195 (named after Ilan and Assaf Ramon), Sunnyvale, California
- Ilan Ramon Day School, Agoura, California

=== In space ===
- Asteroid 51828 Ilanramon
- Ramon Hill, Columbia Hills on Mars
- Ramon Crater, within the Apollo basin, on the far side of the Moon

== See also ==
- Boris Volynov, first Jewish person in space
- Space Shuttle Columbia disaster
- Columbia: The Tragic Loss, a documentary that focuses on Ilan Ramon
