= Yoash Tzidon =

Israeli Air Force officer and politician

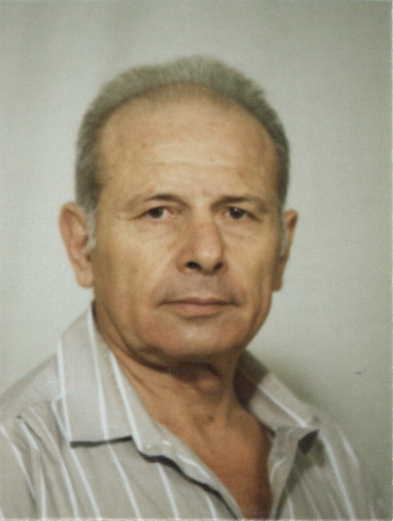
- Tzidon during his time in the Knesset

Faction represented in the Knesset
- 1988–1992: Tzomet

Personal details
- Born: 28 November 1926 Focşani, Romania
- Died: 8 July 2015 (aged 88)

Yoash "Matti" Tzidon (Hebrew: יואש צידון; 28 November 1926 – 8 July 2015) was an Israeli Air Force commander and politician.

== Biography ==
Born Yoash Chatto in Focşani, Romania in 1926, Tzidon emigrated to Mandatory Palestine in 1941. He attended the Hebrew Navy school at the Technion, and later at the Aerial Warfare School in France. Between 1944 and 1948 he was a member of the Palmach, and was involved in illegal Jewish immigration from Egypt and Cyprus between 1945 and 1947. In addition to assisting illegal Jewish immigrants in their attempts to run the British blockade of Palestine, Tzidon took part in sabotage operations against British ships in Cyprus. During the 1948 Arab-Israeli War he was a commander involved in convoys to Jerusalem. He later served as a combat pilot in the Israeli Air Force, before becoming a test pilot, flight trainer, squadron commander and a deputy Air Force base commander. He later became head of the Weapons Systems and Planning in the Air Force, before being demobilised in 1966.

He joined the Movement for Greater Israel, and later the Tzomet party. He was elected to the Knesset in 1988 on the Tzomet list, and was one of the instigators of the law that led to direct elections for the Prime Minister. He lost his seat in the 1992 elections.

== See also ==
- Operation Tarnegol
