= 69 Squadron (Israel) =

Israeli Air Force squadron formed 1948

- טייסת הפטישים
- Active: 1948–1954, 1956, 1969–1994, 1998–Present
- Country: Israel
- Branch: Israeli Air Force
- Role: Strike/Attack
- Garrison/HQ: Hatzerim Airbase
- Nicknames: The Hammers (Hebrew: פטישים, Patishim)
- Colors: Black and Yellow
- Equipment: F-15I Ra'am (Thunder)
- Engagements: 1948 Arab–Israeli War; Suez Crisis; War of Attrition; Yom Kippur War; 1982 Lebanon War; Second Lebanon War; Gaza–Israel conflict

Commanders
- Notable commanders: Pinchas Ben-Porat; Avihu Ben-Nun; Yoram Agmon; Tomer Bar

Aircraft flown
- Attack: F-4 Phantom II
- Bomber: B-17 Flying Fortress

The 69 "Hammers" Squadron is an Israeli Air Force squadron operating the F-15I Thunder out of Hatzerim. It was formed in July 1948 to operate three B-17 Flying Fortresses which the fledgling Israeli Air Force had acquired in the United States. The squadron flew the Flying Fortress, an aircraft credited with propelling the IAF into the realm of modern aerial warfare, during both the 1948 Arab–Israeli War and 1956 Suez Crisis. Disbanded in early 1957, 69 Squadron reformed in 1969 to fly the F-4 Phantom II.

69 Squadron operated the Kurnass (Sledgehammer), as the Phantom was known in Israel, for 25 years. Its Phantoms saw extensive action during the War of Attrition, Yom Kippur War, First Lebanon War and numerous engagements in between. The squadron often played a central role in IAF suppression of enemy air defences (SEAD) efforts and took part in repeated battles against Egyptian and Syrian air defence.

The squadron retired its Phantoms in 1994 and reformed shortly thereafter to operate the F-15I Thunder. Described as the "long-range, heavy bombing element of Israeli air power", 69 Squadron, together with Squadrons 119 and 253, carried out Operation Outside the Box, the September 2007 airstrike on a nuclear site in Syria.

== Formation and B-17 years ==
=== 1948 Arab–Israeli War ===
In early 1948, before the establishment of the State of Israel, the Haganah ordered three Boeing B-17 Flying Fortress planes from the United States through US Mahal operative Al Schwimmer, circumventing a US arms embargo during the 1948 Palestine war. Two were demilitarised and modified for freighter use by Aerodex Inc. of Miami, then sold unknowingly to a front company that said they would be used in the Caribbean. The first two departed the city on June 12, followed a day later by a third, and made their way first to Puerto Rico and then across the Atlantic via the Azores to Žatec, Czechoslovakia, where they arrived on June 14.

By June 16 the story had made it to the press and a fourth plane, whose crew only barely managed to elude the FBI, was impounded in the Azores by Portuguese authorities. At Žatec the three B-17s, missing bomb shackles and sights, oxygen systems and defensive weapons, were militarized and the squadron that was to operate them, at the time referred to as the "Hammers Program", first took shape. Ray Kurtz, a former B-17 navigator with 31 missions over Europe, was assigned command of the squadron, staffed by an international crew of World War II veterans who volunteered to fight for Israel. Robert Luttrell, a sailor by trade, flying as a bombardier, recalled that for each mission the B-17s were given new markings and their armament was altered to lead the enemy to believe Israel possessed an entire squadron of the type.

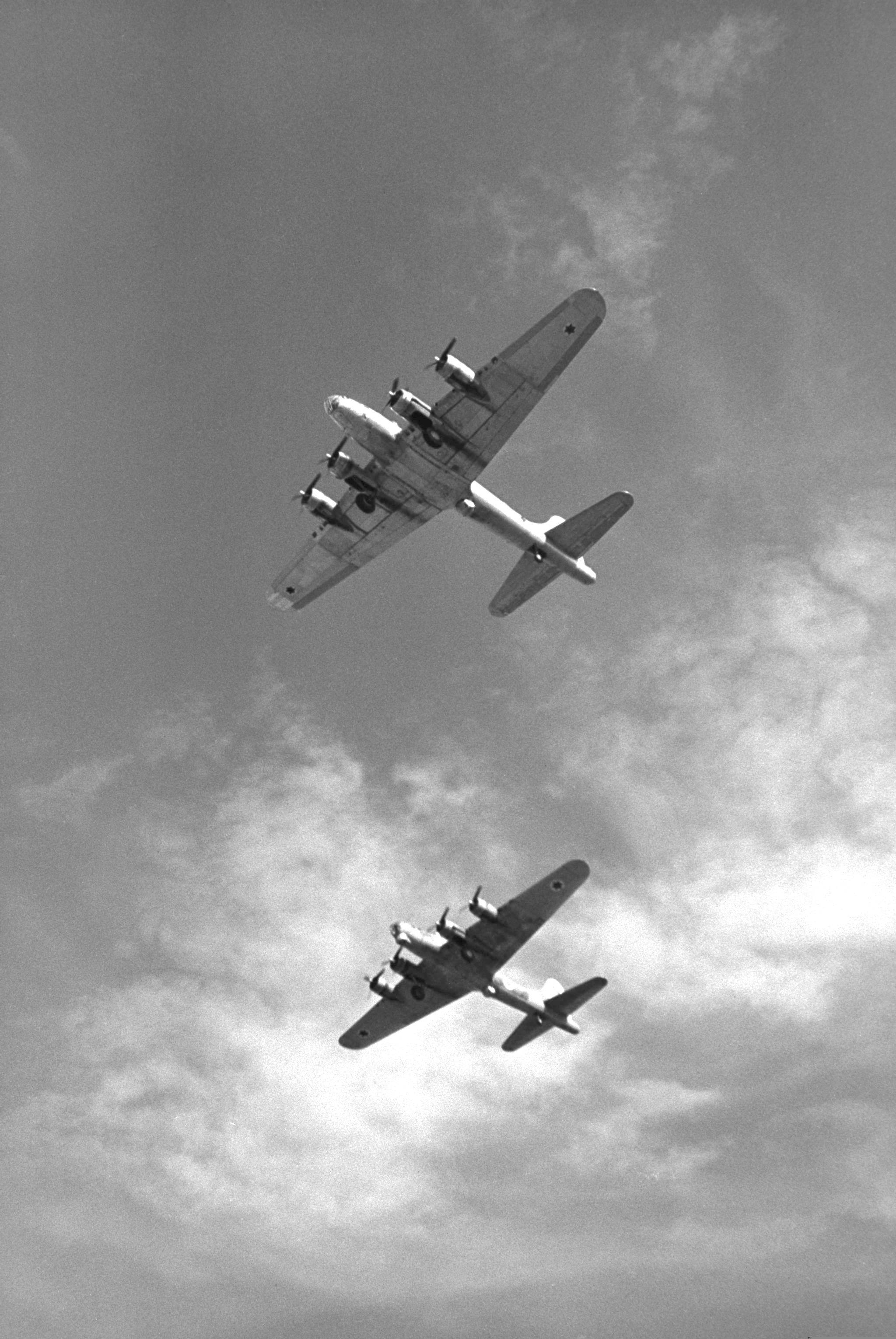
Israeli B-17s in flight, 1953

On July 15, 1948, one of the B-17 planes, recently put in the service of the Israeli Air Force, flew to Cairo and bombarded a residential neighborhood near Qasr al-Qubba, killing 30 Egyptians breaking their Ramadan fast and striking a rail line, in an operation that intended to bomb King Farouq's Abdeen Palace. With fighting raging in Israel and Tel Aviv suffering from Royal Egyptian Air Force (REAF) raids, the three B-17s departed Žatec for Israel. Still ill-equipped, the bombers were tasked with bombing Egyptian targets en route. Flying south along the Adriatic, near Crete the bombers separated, with Bill Katz and Ray Kurtz taking the only Fortress with an oxygen system and a proper sight to bomb the Royal Palace in Cairo, and the other two B-17s heading towards the REAF base at El-Arish. While Katz and Kurtz successfully bombed the Abdeen Palace, the other two failed to locate their target and bombed Rafah instead. All landed that evening at Tel Nof.

The three aircraft were back in action at 06:30 on the next day, hitting the REAF base at El-Arish they had missed the previous night. As Tel-Nof was deemed vulnerable to Egyptian attacks, the aircraft then landed at Ramat David, which housed the squadron for the remainder of the war. In the following days, until a UN-brokered ceasefire came into effect on July 18, the Fortresses struck across three fronts, attacking Majdal, Damascus and Tulkarm. Raising the average bomb load of an IAF sortie from 100 kg per sortie to 743 kg per sortie, the B-17s are credited with propelling the Israeli Air Force into the realm of modern aerial warfare.

All three bombers flew in support of Operation Shoter on July 20. Combat operations then ceased until October 1948. These three months saw the unit reorganize and by August it had received its official designation as 69 Squadron. With Bill Katz now in command, the squadron spent the truce training, qualifying new airmen and equipping the veteran aircraft. Fighting resumed on October 15 with Operation Yoav, aimed with breaking the Egyptian siege of the Negev. Over the next week the Hammers flew 47 sorties against Egyptian targets in and around Majdal, Gaza, El Arish, Al-Faluja, and Rafah. Missions were flown in either a trio or a pair to maximize defensive firepower, and sometimes with 101 Squadron escorts, but no enemy fighters were ever encountered. In late October a number of sorties were flown against Tarshiha, in the Upper Galilee, in support of Operation Hiram against Fawzi al-Qawuqji's Arab Liberation Army.

Operation Yoav had left Faluja as an enclave within Israeli-held territory. During November 1948 the Hammers routinely returned to bomb what became known as the Faluja Pocket. The town held out until the end of the war. On December 22, Israel launched Operation Horev, its last major offensive of the war, to defeat the Egyptian expeditionary force and expel it beyond the borders of Mandatory Palestine. 69 Squadron again flew in support of Israeli efforts in the south, targeting the air base at El-Arish, Khan Younis, Gaza and Rafah. The squadron revisited Faluja to prevent an Egyptian sortie from the beleaguered pocket, and on New Year's Day 1949 flew a failed attempt to bomb an Egyptian Navy flotilla which had shelled Tel Aviv. 69 Squadron flew its last missions of the war in the early morning of January 7, 1949, against Rafah. Having evaded Egyptian flak on most occasions, both participating bombers were hit, rendering one unserviceable.

=== Postwar deactivation ===
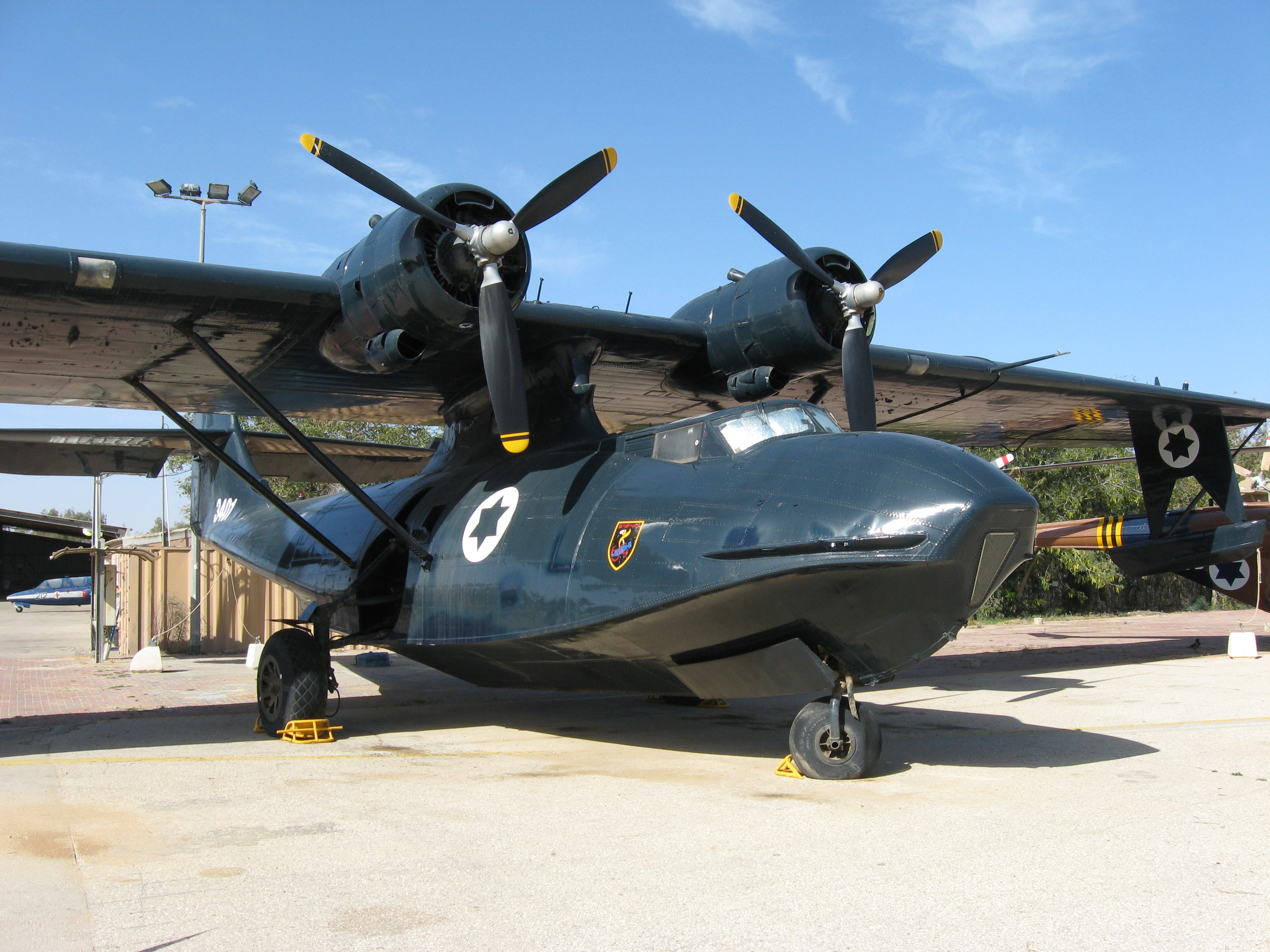
A PBY Catalina at the Israeli Air Force Museum in Hatzerim. The aircraft bears the B-17-era squadron badge

With the end of the 1948 Arab Israeli War, the majority of volunteer airmen returned home, and 69 Squadron went through a period of reorganization. From an English-speaking outfit it was transformed into a Hebrew speaking unit. Training was stepped-up to qualify Israelis to take over vacated positions. The squadron settled into a peacetime routine, with the B-17s conducting bombing and cloud seeding tests and participating in IDF exercises. The IAF itself was undergoing major changes, and in early May 1949 69 Squadron relocated to Tel Nof.

In October 1951 the squadron moved, this time to Hatzor. In December 1952 the three B-17 was joined by three PBY Catalinas, acquired to guarantee supply to the town of Eilat at Israel's southern extremity. Utilization of these aircraft was low and they were soon withdrawn from service with the squadron. Spares, meanwhile, were hampering B-17 operations. In March 1954 69 Squadron was deactivated and its assets handed over to 103 Squadron, which soon retired the Catalinas but continued to operate the three B-17s.

=== Suez Crisis ===
In 1956, growing diplomatic tensions in the Middle East, tensions that would soon culminate in the Suez Crisis, resulted in the resurrection of 69 Squadron. On April 19 the IAF issued an order reactivating the squadron at Ramat David, with Nahum Efrat as its commanding officer. The squadron was soon tasked with its first mission, allocating two B-17s for search and rescue operations during Dassault Mystère delivery flights from France to Israel. The reformed squadron again began training personnel and equipping the aircraft for possible hostilities. As Israel purchased more jet fighters, room had to be made for the new arrivals, and in September 1956 the IAF ordered the squadron to send its aircraft into storage and changed its status to reserve. By October 3 the aircraft had been stored at Bedek Aviation, later Israeli Aircraft Industries, at Lod. Three weeks later, on October 25, the IAF reactivated the squadron.

Only two Fortresses had left Bedek's storage facility by the time hostilities commenced on October 29, 1956. The squadron had not flown a single training sortie before fighting began and had only two full crews ready for battle. Israeli piston-engined aircraft flew few missions in the first two days of the war, but on October 31, 69 Squadron received an order to bomb Rafah in support of IDF Brigade 27 operations. Arriving over the target early on November 1, the aircraft could not tell the location of friendly troops, and without being able to communicate with the forces on the ground, were forced to dump their bomb loads in the Mediterranean. The B-17s were back in action the following night, to attack retreating Egyptian forces. A repeat of the previous night's lack of communications with Israeli forces operating in the same area again prevented the strike, and the bombers dropped their loads on the outskirts of Gaza.

With the threat of Egyptian air power curtailed by Anglo-French strikes against Egyptian air bases, the B-17s began flying daylight operations. On November 2, the squadron supported the Israeli push towards Sharm el Sheikh, on the southern tip of the Sinai. Two aircraft bombed the local barracks but were met with effective anti-aircraft fire which damaged the lead aircraft. The damaged aircraft managed to return to Ramat David, just as the third B-17 returned from storage at Bedek. Two aircraft were therefore available for the B-17s' final combat sorties with the IAF, another failed strike on Sharm el Sheikh on November 4.

The squadron flew 8 sorties throughout the war and dropped 27 tons of bombs. With the conclusion of hostilities the squadron continued training and on November 10 moved to Tel Nof. The B-17s flew a few more sorties during a January 1957 survey of the Sinai but were soon sent back to storage. 69 Squadron was disbanded on March 1, 1957. It was initially slated to operate the IAF's next heavy bomber, the Sud-Ouest Vautour, but these plans were dropped in favour of 110 Squadron.

== Flying the F-4 Phantom II ==
=== War of Attrition ===
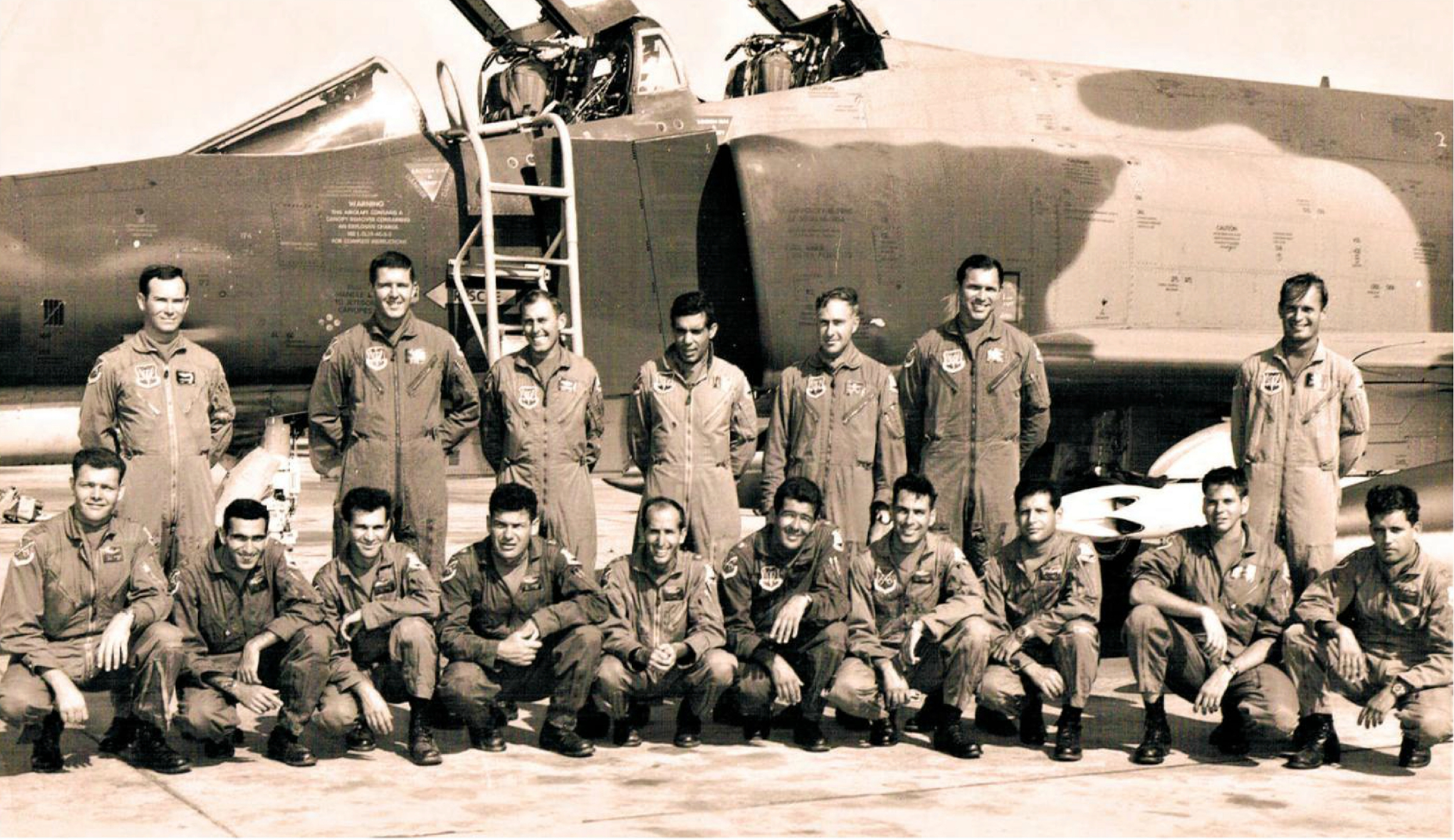
Israeli airmen learning to fly the F-4 Phantom (kneeling) and their American instructors (standing) at George AFB, 1969

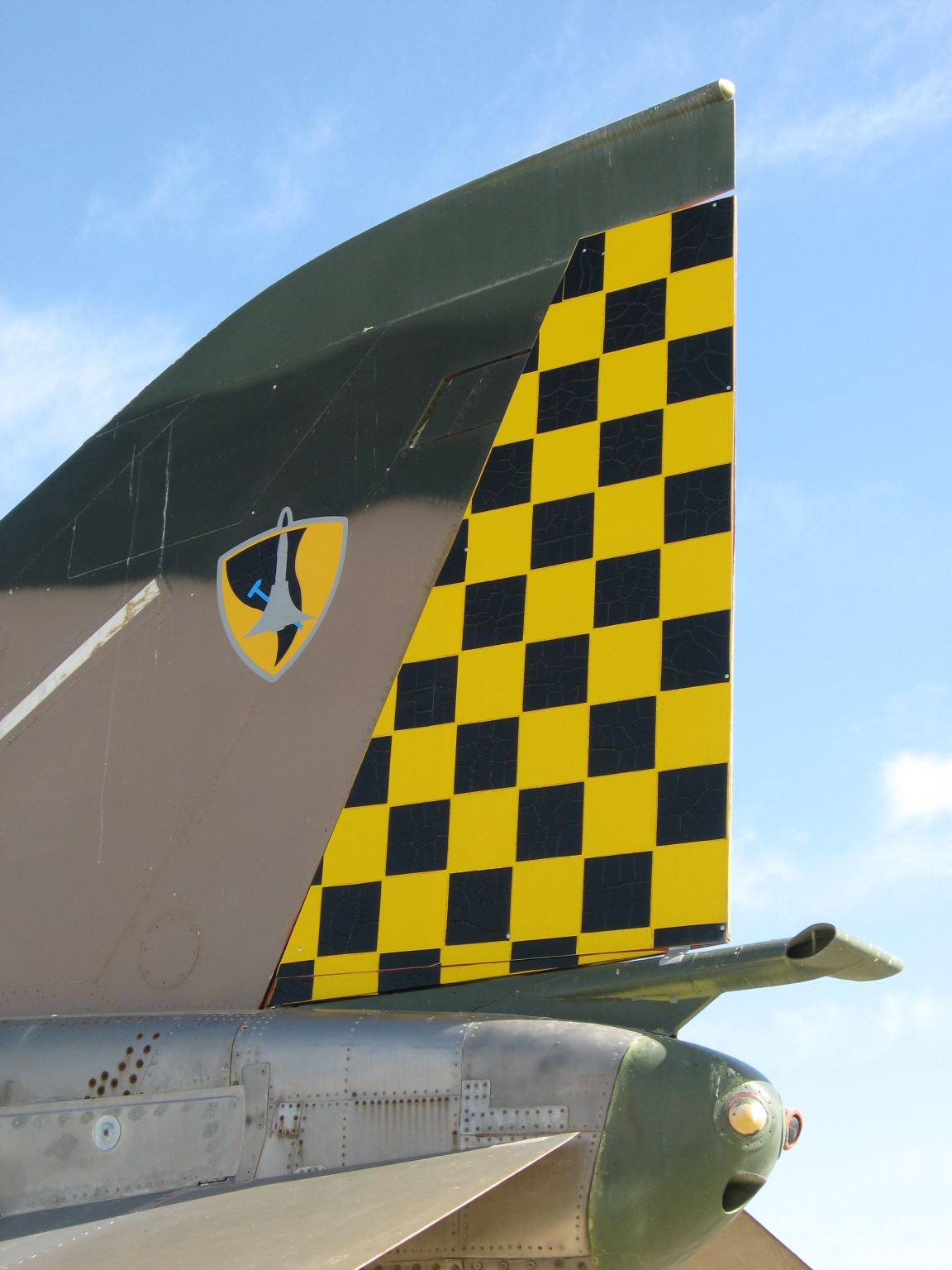
Checkered tail of 69 Squadron F-4 Phantom II

69 Squadron was reactivated at Ramat David on November 1, 1969, headed by Major Avihu Ben-Nun. A year earlier Israel had ordered 50 F-4 Phantoms, enough to equip two squadrons. Ten IAF airmen had spent March to August 1969 training with the 479th Tactical Training Wing at George Air Force Base in California. These included five 69 Squadron airmen: Ben-Nun, Ehud Hankin, Rami Harpaz, Shaul Levi and Achikar Eyal. Upon their return to Israel, then in the midst of the War of Attrition, the 69 Squadron airmen flew both training and combat missions with 201 Squadron, the IAF's first Kurnass squadron. On one such mission on November 11, Hankin and Eyal shot down an Egyptian MiG-21 to score the Phantom's first aerial victory with the IAF.

69 Squadron received its first four aircraft on November 15, the third Peace Echo I batch to arrive in Israel. Although still far from the 12 aircraft required to achieve IAF operational certification, on November 25, 1969, Avihu Ben-Nun led the squadron's debut operational mission, a combat air patrol (CAP). The first air-to-ground mission came three days later, when two Phantoms struck an Egyptian SA-2 battery near Fayid. Still busy forming, receiving new aircraft, training and qualifying fresh airmen, the squadron was soon taking an increasingly large part in the IAF's ongoing battles against Egyptian air defences along the Suez Canal.

When the IAF launched Operation Priha (Blossom) against targets in the Egyptian heartland during January 1970, 69 Squadron was at the forefront of the fighting. On February 8, 1970, pilot Aviem Sella and navigator Shabtai Ben-Shoa downed an Egyptian Air Force MiG-21. Operations, meanwhile, were also conducted to deter Syria from joining the fight, with Phantoms conducting low level runs over Damascus on January 6, 1970, and over 5 major Syrian cities on January 29. The squadron suffered its first combat loss on April 2, when Gideon Magen and Pinchas Nachmani were shot down by a Syrian MiG-21, becoming prisoners of war.

Israeli aerial supremacy prompted Egypt to turn to the USSR for assistance and by the spring of 1970 an entire Soviet air defence division had deployed to Egypt. The Soviet presence spelled the end of Priha and Egypt regained the initiative, rolling its air defence array towards the Suez Canal. The IAF sought to hamper these advances through a renewed SEAD campaign and 69 Squadron saw repeated action against Egyptian air defences and related infrastructure. Egyptian SAMs soon exacted a toll on the attackers, with Rami Harpaz and Achikar Eyal falling into Egyptian captivity on June 30, a fate shared by Amos Zamir and Amos Levitov on July 5.

AN/ALQ-71 Electronic countermeasures (ECM) pods were soon rushed to Israel but proved only partially effective against surface-to-air missiles. On July 18, the IAF attempted to fly eight F-4 Phantoms in close-knit pod formations, thought to maximize the effect of the ECM pods, only to lose 201 Squadron leader Shmuel Hetz, while an injured Avihu Ben-nun was forced to crash land his badly damaged aircraft at Rephidim.

The SEAD campaign was halted. Although the IAF possessed no operational answer to the massive air defence array forming west of the Canal, it still enjoyed supremacy in the air-to-air arena. On July 30, 69 Squadron took part in Operation Rimon 20, a ruse designed to draw Soviet-flown MiG-21s into battle. In the ensuing dogfight, five Soviet fighters were downed, of which one was shot down by Avihu Ben-Nun with Shaul Levi and another by Aviem Sella with Reuven Reshef. With no side securing a clear advantage, yet both able to claim military achievements, American pressure soon bore fruit and a ceasefire marking the end of the war came into effect on August 7, 1970.

=== Reconnaissance ===
With the next round of the Arab–Israeli conflict deemed a mere matter of time, peacetime saw 69 Squadron engaged in developing new SEAD tactics and weapons and in renewed reconnaissance efforts. New weapons such as the AGM-45 Shrike and AGM-12 Bullpup were introduced for the SEAD role. On September 18, 1971, the Hammers flew their first Shrike armed strike against an Egyptian SA-2 battery following the downing of an Israeli C-97 Stratocruiser. As for reconnaissance, the IAF had ordered the RF-4E reconnaissance variant of the Phantom, but these were not slated for delivery until 1971.

69 Squadron had already modified two F-4s in early 1970 for the role by removing their cannons and replacing them with cameras. After the ceasefire these were joined by a pair of loaned American RF-4Cs, which were in operation until the squadron received two RF-4Es in early 1971. While 119 Squadron, which had transitioned to the F-4 in 1970, specialized in high-altitude photography, 69 Squadron adopted low-altitude photography. A mission by reconnaissance Phantoms over northern Syria on September 13, 1973, triggered a large scale clash between the two air forces, resulting in the downing of 13 Syrian MiGs, one at the hands of 69 Squadron's Amnon Arad, and the loss of a single Israeli Mirage III.

=== Yom Kippur War ===
Experienced and well-trained, 69 Squadron nevertheless entered the Yom Kippur War unready for the challenges brought about by start of the war. Prior to the outbreak of war, the IAF had been preparing for a pre-emptive strike against Egyptian and Syrian positions, but this was rejected by the Israeli government. 69 Squadron aircraft were in the process of re-armament to the air-to-air role when hostilities began at 14:00 on October 6, 1973. The aircraft were scrambled to perform CAPs, some having to dump their bomb loads in the Mediterranean, yet no aerial opposition was encountered. The squadron flew 37 sorties on the first day of the war, of which only 4 were strike missions. Two aircraft suffered damage from SA-7s over the Golan Heights.

The next morning saw the squadron participate in Operation Tagar, a SEAD offensive against Egyptian air defences, which began with strikes against Egyptian air bases. Seven Phantoms led by squadron leader Yoram Agmon struck the air base at Gianaclis, and although two defending MiG-21s were shot down, the strike failed to cause significant damage. Tagar was quickly discontinued when the dire situation on the Golan Heights became apparent. 69 Squadron efforts were redirected north where the IAF staged the ill-fated Operation Model 5. Flying with outdated intelligence and no electronic screening against mobile SAM batteries and heavy flak, 6 IAF Phantoms were lost, including 69 Squadron's Ehud Hankin and Shaul Levy in Kurnass 123. Both were killed.

The same evening saw appeals for help from the southern front, leading the squadron to fly strike missions against Egyptian bridges and assembly points on the Suez Canal. Another Phantom was lost to surface-to-air missiles, its crew falling into captivity. Four more aircraft were lost on the following day, October 8. One was lost in an otherwise successful morning strike against the Syrian air base at Dumayr, its crew captured. Another was lost over the Golan Heights, and two more during night strikes against Egyptian bridges across the canal, all falling prey to the SA-6. Although four airmen were rescued by Israeli forces, pilot Zvulun Amizi and navigator Zeev Yogev were killed.

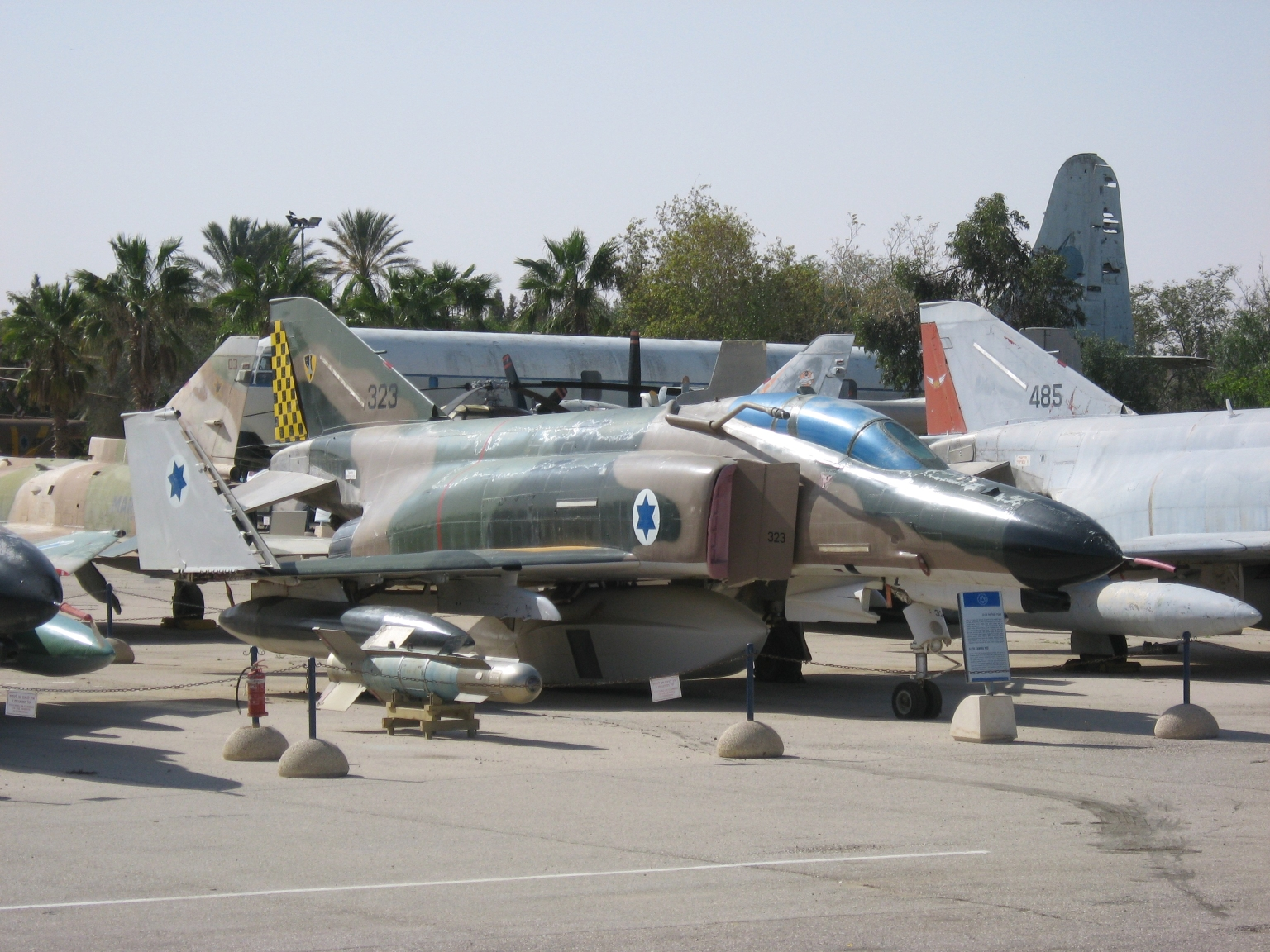
A "Toad"-liveried F-4E Phantom II

Three days into the war, 69 Squadron had lost six aircraft. Four airmen had been killed and four became prisoners of war. The detailed planning and extensive training undertaken before the war had gone to waste and the sustained campaign required to defeat enemy air defences was abandoned in the face of Egyptian and Syrian advances. Nevertheless, it had been the close air support provided by the IAF that helped Israeli troops on the ground to stem the tide and eventually go on the offensive, first in the north and later in the south.

October 10 saw the Hammers strike the Egyptian air base at Quweisna, while two Syrian MiGs were claimed on the northern front. The next day the IDF pushed into Syria, and 69 Squadron was at hand striking fuel depots, SAM sites and the air bases at Dumayr, Nasiriya and Damascus. One aircraft was lost over Lebanon, where its crew were interned until the end of the war. Syria was the primary target for air base strikes on October 12 and 13. Yoram Agmon and Daniel Whittman claimed two aerial victories, one on each of these two days.

The squadron lost another aircraft on October 14, possibly the result of friendly fire on the southern front, with the crew rescued. The same day the IAF began receiving attrition replacements from USAF stocks. These Phantoms were delivered in their darker Southeast Asia scheme and rushed into service without repainting, gaining the name "Toads". To ease maintenance, most were retained by 69 Squadron, which transferred several of its airframes to 201 Squadron.

Unlike Israeli aircraft, the new aircraft were equipped with TISEO targeting equipment, allowing them to launch the AGM-65 Maverick, another component of the American airlift. 69 Squadron was therefore entrusted with the introduction of the Maverick into Israeli service. No training flights were flown, the first launch occurring in combat, against a Syrian-held bunker on the Hermon. Some 50 missiles were launched in the course of the war. 69 Squadron continued hammering Syrian infrastructure and Egyptian air bases in the following days. On October 16, Yoram Agmon shot down a Syrian MiG-21 to become to only pilot to achieve ace status while flying with the squadron. The Hammers flew their final air base strike of the war on October 20, striking the EAF air base at Khutamiyah. Pilot Doodi Zait and navigator Yoram Rubinstein were hit by a SAM and forced to ejected, becoming POWs in Egypt.

=== Postwar activity ===
The Yom Kippur War ended on October 24. 69 Squadron had flown 789 sorties, had lost 9 aircraft, and had shot down 10 enemy aircraft. Four airmen had been killed and eight had become prisoners of war. The end of the war did not spell an end to the fighting. On December 6, a mixed 69 and 119 squadrons combat air patrol over the Gulf of Suez engaged a flight of MiG-21s to score one kill, possibly two. The kill was credited to 69's Yiftach Shadmi and Meir Gur, with the MiG-21s revealed to be a part of a North Korean contingent that had deployed to Egypt during the war. With the arrival of spring, fighting resumed in the north, where Israel and Syria had yet to sign a disengagement agreement. On April 8, 1974, while on patrol against low flying Syrian helicopters, the squadron lost one of its aircraft, probably to a shoulder-launched SA-7. The crew, Shadmi and Rafaeli, were interned in Lebanon for a month. Three weeks later, on April 29, the squadron scored two aerial kills against Syrian MiG-21s, the squadron's final victories to date. Fighting ceased on May 31 1974.

The postwar years were spent implementing the lessons of the Yom Kippur War. SEAD tactics were improved, training was stepped up and innovative technologies introduced. The Hammers cooperated with Rafael, Israel's weapon systems development authority, in the introduction of the Tadmit electro-optical fire-and-forget guided bomb, a modified version of the AGM-62 Walleye II. At the same time, the Phantom's air-to-air role was diminished with the introduction into service of the F-15 Eagle and the F-16 Fighting Falcon. The squadron was the first IAF squadron to introduce Rafael's Python 3 into service in March 1977.

Air-to-air training continued and on December 29, 1977, during combat against a pair of F-15s, two squadron aircraft collided. Squadron leader Avsha Friedman and navigator Avihu Ikar were killed. The remains of their aircraft, Kurnass 305, stand as a memorial to the two pilots on the Acre-Carmiel road. On January 20, 1981, the squadron lost another pilot in similar circumstances, when Kurnass 222 collided with F-16 222. Squadron leader Eliezer Adar ejected, but Dani Weiss was killed, as was the F-16 pilot, Uri Ben-Amitai.

The Hammers flew 28 support, 13 reconnaissance and 6 combat air patrols during Operation Litani, Israel's March 1978 invasion of Lebanon. In 1976 the squadron had received two additional RF-4Es, and was soon flying high-altitude reconnaissance. This led to its participation in the preparations for the 1981 Operation Opera to destroy Iraq's Osirak nuclear reactor, which the Hammers were initially planned to conduct. The squadron trained for the raid using the Tadmit, but these plans were dropped when the F-16 entered IAF service in 1980. On November 12, 1980, the squadron carried out the IAF's longest fighter mission hitherto, when two reconnaissance birds photographed the reactor near Baghdad. The mission involved three aerial refuelings, including one over enemy territory. Tensions over Lebanon flared once more in 1981, and on May 29, 1981, the squadron carried out Operation Mole 9, striking Libyan SA-9 batteries protecting PLO bases near Beirut.

=== 1982 Lebanon War ===
By the spring of 1982 tensions had risen again and the attempted assassination of the Israeli ambassador to London Shlomo Argov on June 3, 1982, prompted Israel to launch Operation Peace for Galilee. 69 Squadron flew 27 sorties in the preparation phase for the operation, from June 4 to the actual beginning of the invasion on June 6. The first of these were carried out on the afternoon of June 4, when a 4-ship formation struck the stadium in Beirut, used as a PLO weapons depot. Once Israeli ground forces began pushing into Lebanon, 69 Squadron provided close air support. One aircraft was damaged by enemy flak on the first day of the invasion, and two suffered landing accidents, but with poor weather and a shortage of targets, there was initially little fighting to be done. This changed on June 8 when it became apparent the Syrian forces in Lebanon would have to be engaged, and that same afternoon two squadron Phantoms bombed a Syrian electronic warfare facility at Jabel Barouk.

Kill-marking borne by Mole Cricket 19 Phantoms

Syrian SAMs had been a constant threat to IAF operations, and as the war progressed the Syrian SAM array in the Bekaa Valley was bolstered with additional batteries. It was therefore decided to launch a comprehensive assault on the Syrian defences, in order to secure aerial superiority over the area and ensure air support for Israeli ground forces. At 14:00 on June 9 the IAF launched Operation Mole Cricket 19, the culmination of 10 years of planning and preparation. 69 Squadron participated with 13 Tadmit and four follow-up free-fall bombers sent against the Syrians. The former operated individually, targeting Syrian fire control centers and radars, in all engaging seven SAM batteries.

Mole Cricket 19 was a resounding success, with 14 out of 19 SAM batteries in the Bekaa destroyed and dozens of Syrian fighters downed in the ensuing dogfights. After the peak of June 9, during which 29 sorties were flown, activity declined. 12 more sorties were flown on June 10 and 19 on June 11, when a ceasefire came into effect. The squadron had flown 152 sorties throughout the offensive, of which 71 were close air support, 35 SEAD and 31 reconnaissance.

Once again, the official end of hostilities did not spell an end to fighting and Israel remained engaged in Lebanon for years to come. When the Syrians introduced the SA-8 Gecko into Lebanon in July 1982, IAF Phantoms were sent to hunt down four launchers on July 24 and two were claimed by 69 Squadron. Up to its disbandment in 1994, the squadron took part in repeated strikes against terrorist organizations operating from Lebanon. On one such operation on October 16, 1986, a bomb exploded immediately after release from Kurnass 306, forcing both crew to eject. The pilot, Yishai Aviram, was rescued by an IAF AH-1 Cobra, but navigator Ron Arad was captured by members of the Shi'a Amal Movement. Initial negotiations for an exchange of prisoners failed and Arad has been missing since and his fate remains unknown.

In early 1986 the squadron introduced the AGM-142 Popeye into IAF service, and for nearly a decade was the only IAF squadron to operate the missile. In 1987 its Phantoms played the role of Soviet "MiG-29s" in the film "Iron Eagle II". Filming coincided with the receipt of several birds from 105 Squadron, which appropriately appeared in the film bearing that unit's distinctive red flash on the fuselage, with the IAF markings replaced with the Soviet red star insignia. The squadron trained extensively for possible participation in the 1990 Gulf War, but Israel eventually stayed out of the conflict. In June 1991, the squadron relocated to the air base at Hatzerim, from which it flew 79 sorties during Operation Accountability in April 1993. In the wake of the Oslo Accords the US agreed to supply the IAF with the F-15E Strike Eagle. 69 Squadron was disbanded in early 1994 in expectation of its re-equipment with the new aircraft.

== Thunder Squadron ==
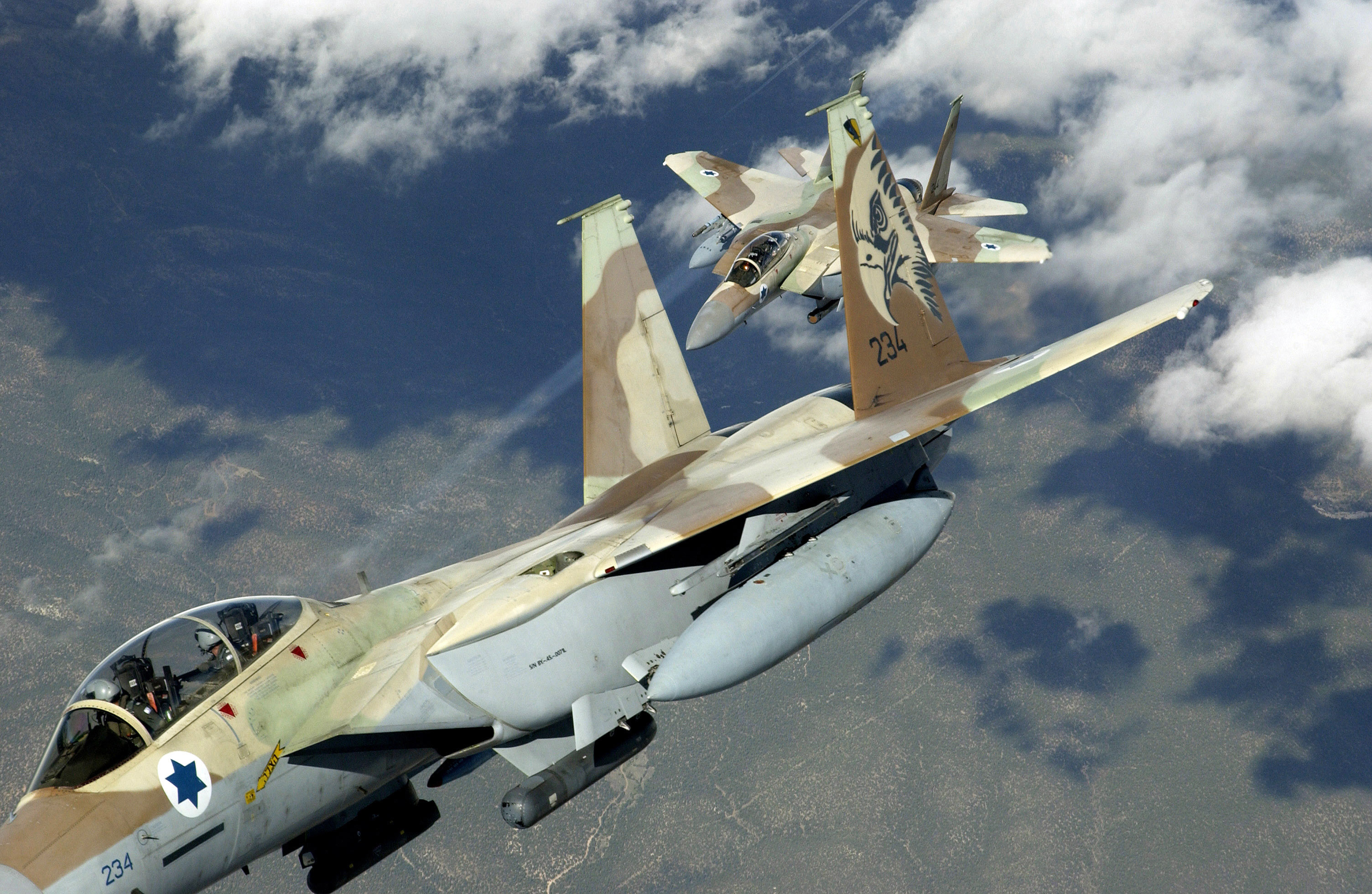
A 69 Squadron F-15I Ra'ams at Red Flag 04-3

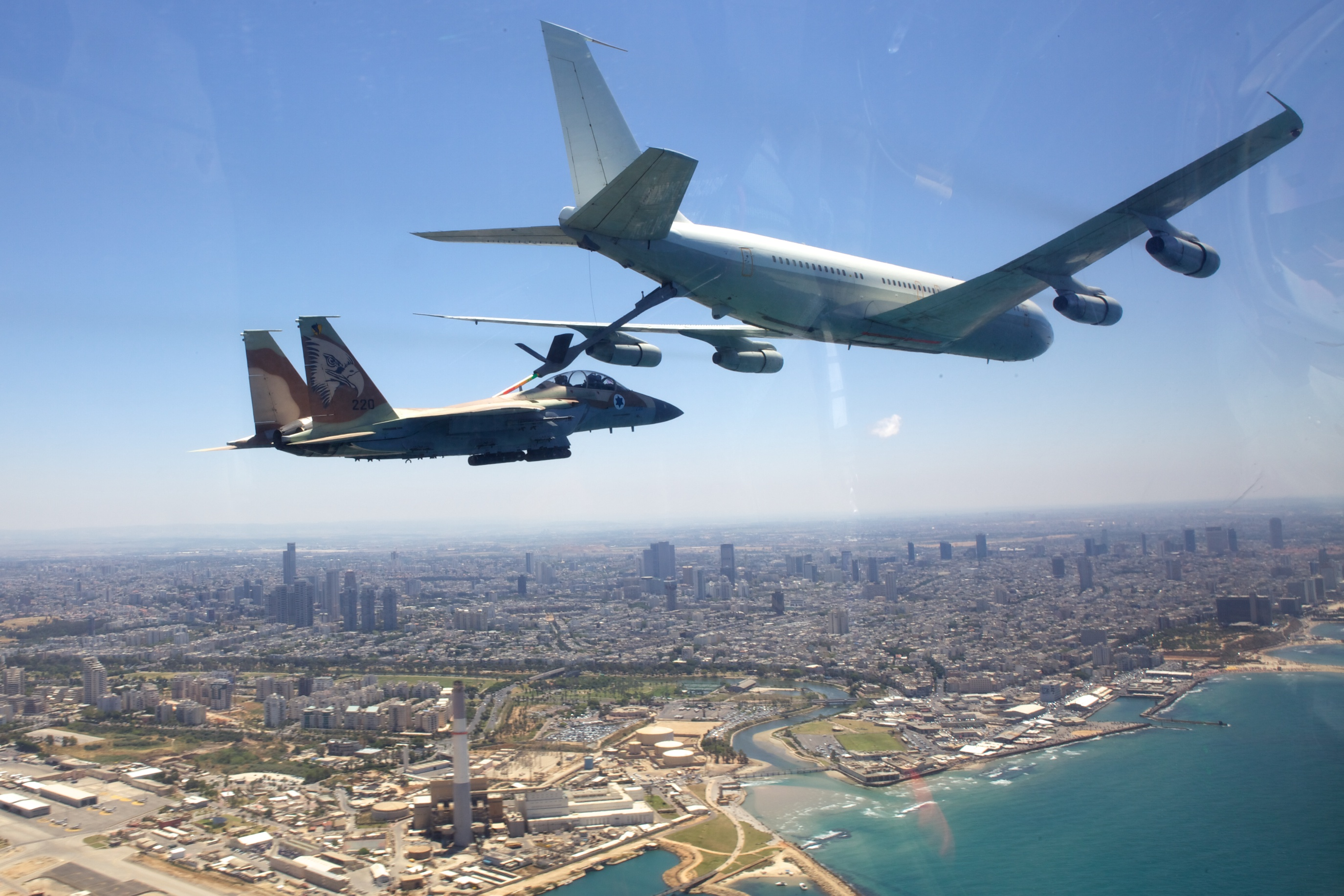
F-15I refueling from IAF KC-707 over Tel-Aviv, Independence Day 2011

Four Israeli airmen, led by future squadron leader Dror Ben-David, travelled to the US in 1997 for the F-15E conversion course. The first two aircraft landed in Hatzerim on January 19, 1998. 16 aircraft had arrived by January 1, 1999, when the squadron was declared operational, and 10 days later the unit carried out it first operational sorties over southern Lebanon. Deliveries were completed in June 2000, by which time the squadron had taken part in operations in support of the May 2000 Israeli withdrawal from Lebanon.

The squadron has since undertaken numerous missions during the Second Intifada and Operation Cast Lead. During the Second Lebanon War the Hammers flew 1,400 sorties, totalling 2,300 flying hours, more than any other IAF combat unit. During this conflict, the Ra'am's long range and endurance served it well in the close support role, as the aircraft could carry more munitions and remain on station longer than any other strike aircraft. It is these capabilities that place 69 Squadron at the forefront of Israel's strategic arm, and it this unit that is reputed to have undertaken Operation Orchard, the destruction of a Syrian nuclear site on September 6, 2007. The squadron has been linked to a possible Israeli strike against the Iranian nuclear program.

Since its reactivation, the 69 Squadron has undertaken multiple deployments abroad. It was the first Israeli unit to participate in exercise Red Flag in October 1998, and has taken part in several Red Flags since. It has deployed to Turkey, Italy and Greece on several occasions, and three aircraft participated in the 2001 RAF Waddington International Air Show.

== 2023 Israeli anti-judicial reform protests ==
On 5 March 2023, as part of the 2023 Israeli anti-judicial reform protests, 37 out of 40 of the squadron's reservist pilots announced that they would refuse to take part in an upcoming training exercise in response to a planned judicial reform by the government of Prime Minister Benjamin Netanyahu. In a statement, the pilots stated that they were not prepared to serve a "dictatorial regime". According to The Guardian, the refusal raised questions concerning the IDF's operational competence, as the pilots, who fly F-15I Strike Eagle jets, are "strategically crucial" to the Israeli military. In response, Commander of the Israeli Air Force Tomer Bar and Chief of the General Staff Herzi Halevi announced they would meet with reservist pilots on 7 March.

== See also ==
- 1973 Syrian General Staff Headquarters Raid
- 2024 Hezbollah headquarters strike
