= Aviem Sella =

Israeli spy and businessman

Aviem Sella (Hebrew: אביאם סלע; born January 7, 1946) is an Israeli businessman and former commander in the Israeli Air Force. In 1987, he was charged in absentia on three counts of espionage for recruiting Jonathan Pollard, who served a 30-year sentence for spying on the United States for Israel. U.S. President Donald Trump pardoned Sella during the morning of January 20, 2021, before Trump left office later in the day.

== Biography ==
Aviem Sella was born in Haifa during the Mandatory Palestine era. He studied at the Hebrew Reali School, and was drafted into the Israel Defense Forces in 1963. Sella is married to Yehudit, a lawyer, and has three children. He completed his PhD at Tel Aviv University's Faculty of Management and earned a degree in economics from the Hebrew University of Jerusalem.

== Military career and espionage ==
He served in the Israeli Air Force as a fighter pilot. In 1967, he fought in the Six-Day War with 109 Squadron. He was one of the first Israeli pilots to fly F-4 Phantom jets. He fought in the War of Attrition of 1967-1970, participating in Operation Priha (January–April 1970) and Operation Rimon 20 (July 1970). The outbreak of the Yom Kippur War in 1973 found Sella in the United States studying at a professional course; he returned to Israel and fought in the war as deputy commander of 69 Squadron. In total, he shot down five enemy aircraft during his service.

Between 1976 and 1979 he commanded 201 Squadron, and between 1980 and 1983, he served as the Air Force's Director of Operations. He commanded Operation Opera, the air strike against the Iraqi Osirak nuclear reactor in 1981, and was a commanding officer in Operation Mole Cricket 19 during the 1982 Lebanon War.

After serving in the 1982 Lebanon War, Sella took a sabbatical to the United States to study, and earned an MA in computer science at New York University. While pursuing a PhD, Sella recruited Jonathan Pollard to spy for Israel. Pollard was arrested in 1985 and pleaded guilty to espionage charges in 1987. Sella fled the United States and returned to Israel immediately after Pollard's arrest.

Pollard's Israeli handlers were granted immunity from prosecution in the United States in exchange for cooperation after Pollard's arrest. Sella's role, however, was unknown at the time and the Israelis were not forthcoming about his involvement. For this reason, Sella was not given immunity by the U.S. when his role was uncovered. Israel then refused to extradite Sella for questioning. In March 1987 a Federal grand jury indicted Sella on three counts of espionage which carried a potential maximum sentence of life imprisonment and a $500,000 fine. Israel was not required to extradite him under the US-Israel extradition treaty, as the treaty does not cover cases of espionage.

On March 3, 1987, when Sella was given command of Tel Nof Airbase, the U.S. Congress reacted by threatening to cut aid to Israel. U.S. officials in Israel were instructed to have no contact with Sella or with the airbase so long as he commanded it. Israel refused to relieve him of his duties, creating tensions. Sella then resigned on March 30, to defuse US-Israel tensions, and was subsequently appointed an instructor at Israel's National Security College.

U.S. President Donald Trump granted Sella a full pardon on January 20, 2021.

In September 2021, Sella was promoted to brigadier general, at the request of Amikam Norkin, commander of the IAF, with the approval from IDF Chief of Staff Aviv Kochavi, and Minister of Defense, Benny Gantz. He was originally promoted to brigadier general in March 1987, but left the IAF before actually receiving the rank.

== Business career ==
In 1990 he founded "Sibm", an IT company, which acted as a consultant on information systems. In September 2003, he sold his company - which had 40 employees - to Matrix ID Ltd and became director of strategic consulting at Matrix's Security Division. From 2005 to 2006, he served as chairman of the Adam Milo Institute in Jerusalem. He also became a business partner of Alexander Beer, a brewery based in the Emek Hefer Industrial Park.

== Sella Pardon ==
During the morning of January 20, 2021, the last half-day of Donald Trump's U.S. Presidency, the White House announced that Trump had granted a full pardon to Sella. The announcement stated that the State of Israel had requested the pardon and had issued a full and unequivocal apology. The announcement also stated that Prime Minister of Israel Benjamin Netanyahu, Israeli Ambassador to the United States Ron Dermer, United States Ambassador to Israel David Friedman and Miriam Adelson had supported Sella's request for clemency.
