= Rami Harpaz =

Fighter pilot in the Israeli Air Force

Col. Rami Harpaz, commander of Israeli Air Force Base Ramat David, 1978.

Rami Harpaz (Hebrew: רמי הרפז; February 1, 1939 – January 24, 2019) was a colonel in the Israel Defence Forces and a prisoner of war during the War of Attrition. Harpaz served as a fighter pilot in the Israeli Air Force (IAF) and spent three and a half years in an Egyptian prison. Following his release, he returned to the Air Force and came to command the IAF base at Ramat David.

== Biography ==
Harpaz was the son of Shifra and Shlomo Harpaz (Goldberg) and the brother of the astrophysicist Amos Harpaz. He was born in Herzliya and grew up in Kibbutz Mishmar HaEmek and Kibbutz Hazorea. In his youth, he was a member of the Israel Aviation Club and the Air Force youth movement. Harpaz enlisted in the IDF in 1956 and completed a pilot course (No. 25) in August 1958, majoring in combat. In the advanced training course he flew the Dassault Ouragan and then served as a fighter pilot in Dassault Mystere and Dassault Super Mystere squadrons. He instructed in the IAF flight school and in an advanced training course, served in the Scorpion squadron and was discharged from regular service in 1961. He worked at Kibbutz Hazorea and did a year of service at Kibbutz Zikim. During the Six Day War, he served as a first lieutenant in the 107th Squadron, flying the Ouragan, and served as a senior leader in attack formations. He participated in 24 operational sorties during the war, the highest number among air force fighter pilots.

After the war he re-enlisted into permanent service. He converted to the Dassault Mirage III which he flew with 117t Squadron. He was later a member of the A-44 Skyhawk absorption team and served with the 109th Squadron. During the War of Attrition with Egypt, he participated in many operational raids, first with 109th Squadron, with which he served until the arrival of the F-4 Phantom and took part in the raid on Green Island and Operation Raviv. After the arrival of the Phantoms, he served in the 69 Squadron as a systems officer, participated in anti-aircraft bombings at Fayed Airport, bombed an anti-aircraft bomb in Ja’eefa, flew a deterrent mission over Damascus in January 1970, carried out operations, attacked the port of Ras Banas and a destroyer anchored there, within Operation Hair and other sorties. During Operation Hair 7, on June 30, 1970, his aircraft was hit by an anti-aircraft missile and he and navigator Eyal Ahikar, were forced to eject over Egyptian territory. During his captivity he underwent severe interrogations and torture; he became the leader of Israeli prisoners imprisoned at this time in the Abassia prison in Cairo: Air Force team members Menachem Eini, Yitzhak Fir, Avinoam Kaldes, Amos Levitov and Amos Zamir; Reserve officer Dan Avidan; Paratrooper David Levy and two logistics soldiers Moti Cohen and Moti Bavli. Harpaz and his fellow pilots translated the book "The Hobbit" into Hebrew in what became known as the Pilots' translation. He was released from captivity in November 1973, after the Yom Kippur War. Soon after he became a prisoner of war his twin daughters were born.

Lt.Col. Menachem Eini is shaking Golda Meir's hand while presenting the prime minister with the Israeli flag that Lt. Col. Rami Harpaz (on the left) has knitted in captivity, Nov. 1973.

After his return from over 3 years of captivity he returned to serve as a pilot in the air force, he commanded a squadron and served as deputy commander of Etzion base. In 1977, he was appointed commander of Ramat David, where he served until January 1980. He continued to serve in the reserve and served as an instructor at the flight school until 1993 and commander of the Megiddo emergency airfield, until his retirement from the reserve service in 2016.

Harpaz died on January 24, 2019. He was a member of Kibbutz Hazorea, was married to Nurit and the couple had 5 children, their youngest son Erez died during a trip to Bolivia. His elder son, Amir, followed his tracks in the IAF, as a combat pilot and commander that also became a Lt. Col. by the time he ended his military service. After his release from the IDF, Rami Harpaz served as CEO of the Plastopil-Hazorea plant for six years and later as an employee in the product engineering department and development manager at the company.
