= The Hammers =

The Hammers may refer to:

- West Ham United F.C., a professional English football club
- PFC Minyor Pernik, a professional Bulgarian football club
- Forge FC, a professional Canadian soccer club
- 69 Squadron IAF, an Israeli Air Force squadron
