= Operation Tagar =

1973 battle of the Yom Kippur War

- Part of the Yom Kippur War
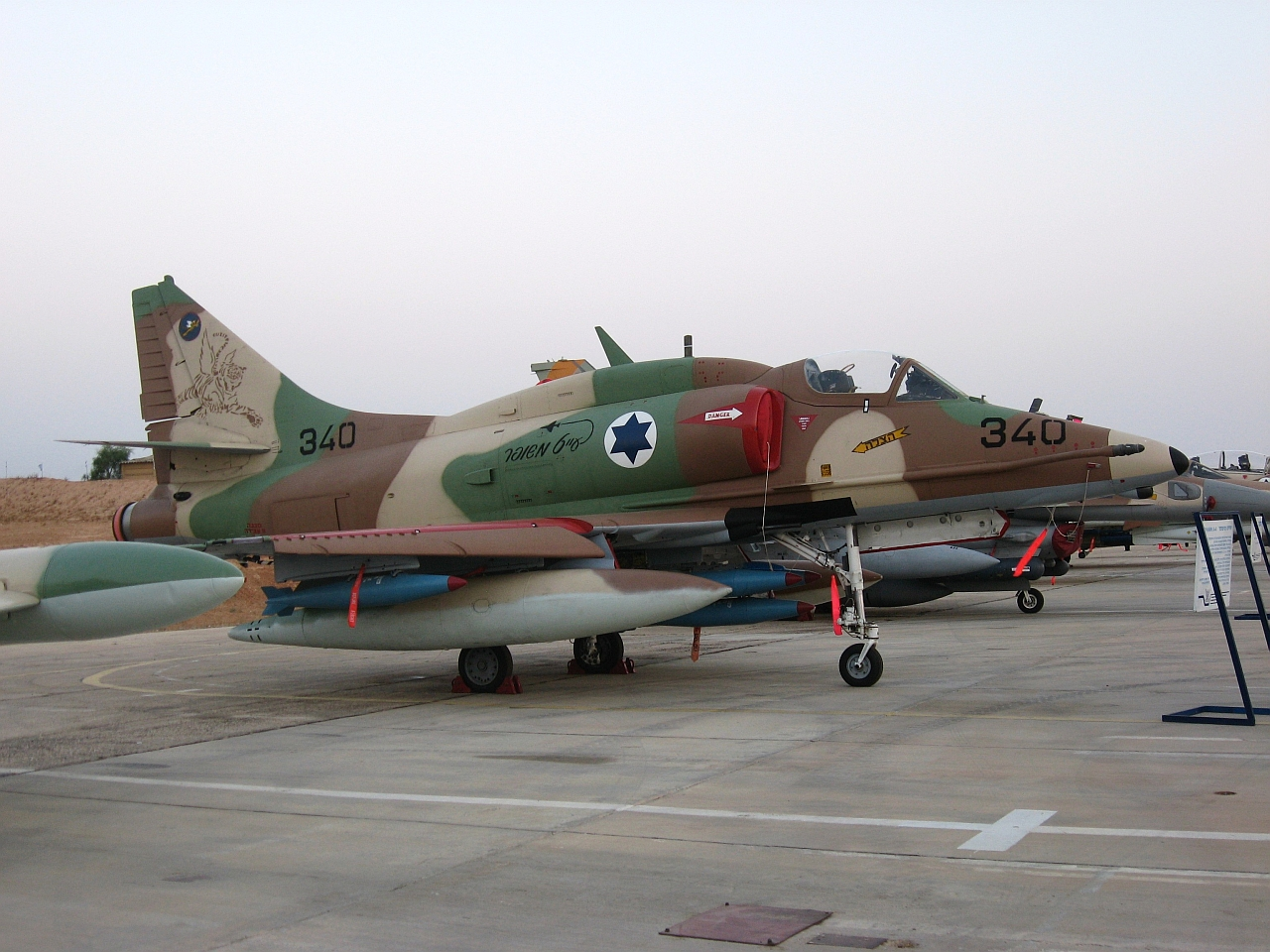
- Israeli A-4 Skyhawk
Date	October 7, 1973
Location	Egypt
Result	Discontinued after initial attack wave

Belligerents
Egypt	Israel

Commanders and leaders
Hosni Mubarak; Ahmed ibn Ali bin Hussein ibn Dawud †	David Elazar; Benny Peled; David Ivry

Casualties and losses
7 air bases damaged	2 A-4 Skyhawks lost, 2 pilots killed

Operation Tagar (Hebrew: תגר, Quarrel) was the name of an Israeli Air Force operation which took place over Egypt on October 7, 1973, the second day of the Yom Kippur War.

The operation was preplanned as a sweeping operation to destroy all of the Egyptian surface-to-air missile batteries on the Egyptian front, by using unguided, general-purpose bombs dropped from a medium altitude near the targets. The attacking aircraft were to approach the targets at a very low altitude, in order to avoid being detected by Egyptian radars (especially fire control and target acquisition radars such as the Flat Face and Long Track).

The operation was composed of three attack waves, the first of which was to disable Egyptian Air Force bases, while the aim of the following two waves was to demolish the Egyptian missile batteries.

The operation was discontinued after the first attack wave damaged several Egyptian air force bases, due to the need for more air power on the Syrian front and in order to execute Operation Doogman 5.
