= Bardawil International Airport =

Airport in Egypt

Bardawil International Airport مطار البردويل الدولى
- IATA: RDL; ICAO: HE36

Summary
- Elevation AMSL: 1,056 ft (322 m)
- Coordinates: 30°24′26″N 33°9′15″E
- Interactive map of Bardawil International Airport

Runways
Direction	Length		Surface
Direction	ft	m	Surface
15/33	8,241	2,512	Asphalt

Bardawil International Airport (also Bir Gifgafa, Meliz or Rephidim) is an airport in the Sinai of Egypt. It is located 90 km (55 miles) east of the Suez Canal. During the 1960s and 1970s it played a significant role in Arab–Israeli wars, at different times serving both Egypt and Israel.

== Construction ==
Bir Jifjafa was constructed by the Egyptian Air Force in the aftermath of the Suez Crisis of 1956. Assigned base number 244, it was responsible for providing air cover and close support for Egyptian Army units in the Sinai.

== The Six Day War ==
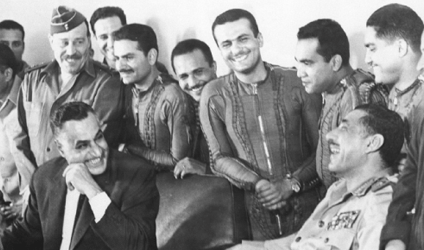
May 22, 1967, Nasser visits Egyptian Air Force pilots at Bir Jifjafa on the eve of the Six Day War.

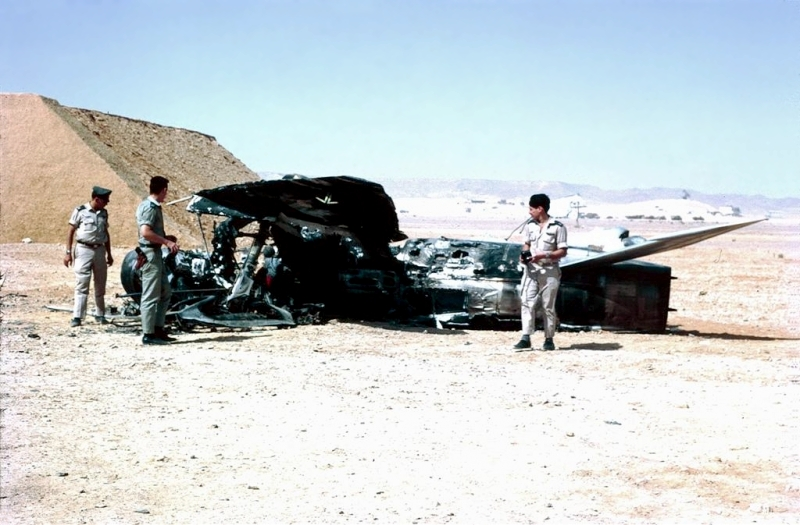
Destroyed MiG-21 at Bir Jifjafa, June 1967.

On May 22, 1967, as Israel and its Arab neighbours were drawing closer to war, president Gamel Abdel Nasser of Egypt visited Bir Jifjafa, meeting with Egyptian Air Force (EAF) pilots and commanders. In a much publicized press conference Nasser announced his intention to close the Straits of Tiran to Israeli shipping and declared that 'We are now on the verge of a confrontation with Israel', adding that 'If the Jews threaten us war? I say to them "Welcome, we are ready for war!"'

As the most important Egyptian air base in the Sinai, housing units that could pose a major threat to Israeli aerial supremacy, Bir Jifjafa figured prominently in the Israeli Air Force's planning for a pre-emptive strike. On the eve of the war the air base contained elements of the EAF's 15th fighter regiment, including part of the 45th fighter squadron flying MiG-21F-13s or MiG-21PFs. A number of transports and Mil Mi-6 helicopters were stationed there as well. No less than six IAF formations were therefore assigned to attack the base: four Dassault Ouragan formations from 113 Squadron at Hatzor and two 109 Squadron Dassault Mystere formations from Ramat David.
When Israel finally launched Operation Focus on June 5, Bir Jifjafa was the target of the very first formation to take off from Hatzor at 07:14. The four Ouragans, led by Captain Ran Alon, struck the field at 07:45, hitting the runway and destroying several aircraft, including one MiG-21 which had just taken off. The MiG was downed by Captain David Yariv, who was himself subsequently hit by anti-aircraft fire and killed. The fierce anti-aircraft fire took its toll on the other aircraft as well, with a second Ouragan forced to perform a belly landing upon returning to Ramat David, while Captain Mordechai Lavon became a prisoner of war after ejecting his stricken aircraft over the Mediterranean and swimming ashore at Gaza. By 09:05, when the first wave of operation Focus was concluded, Bir Jifjafa had been hit by three more 113 Squadron formations and by four 109 Squadron Dassault Mysteres.

Another 109 Squadron formation arrived at Bir Jifjafa at 09:55, while four 105 Squadron Super Mysteres attacked the field in the afternoon, although by then Bir Jifjafa had been completely disabled and there was little damage to be done. The Egyptian air force had lost as many as 20 MiG-21s, at least four Mi-6s and a MiG-15UTI.

Although defended by the 4th Armored Division of the Egyptian army, plus a motorized infantry brigade, these forces were withdrawn as the Egyptian effort in the Sinai collapsed, and the airfield was taken by the IDF's 84th Tal Division on June 7. Once secure, IAF Nords and Dakotas begun flying in supplies for the Israeli army, as well as an MIM-23 Hawk battery to provide air defence. Several dozen AA-2 Atoll missiles and nine missile launchers were captured in Bir Jifjafa. Testing proved their compatibility with the Mirage III, and these were pressed into service with 119 Squadron in December 1967, after several successful test firings the previous month.

== Rephidim Airbase ==
Israeli gains in the Six Day War meant that a great distance now lay between the air force's air bases and the front lines in the Sinai, along the Suez Canal. Israel therefore decided to employ Bir Jifjafa as a forward operating base. Following Egyptian Air Force incursions into the Sinai, four 101 Squadron Mirages first deployed there on July 26, 1967. Bir Jifjafa officially resumed operations in May 1968 as Israeli Air Force Base (Baha) 3. It was named Rephidim, after the station mentioned in the Biblical account of the Exodus from Egypt. Despite having the most rudimentary installations at first, the field and its surrounding environs soon became the hub of all IDF operations in the western Sinai, housing various air force, army and logistical units. It was also the IAF's transportation hub for the Sinai and was often frequented by the IAF's heavy transport aircraft, such as the C-97 Stratocruiser and Boeing 707, as well as lesser types.

=== The War of Attrition ===
As fighting intensified along the Suez Canal, the Israeli Air Force now dispatched its fighter squadrons on regular deployments to the airfield, with four pilots and aircraft rotating every two or three weeks. Two aircraft regularly stood on quick reaction alert (QRA) at the base, ready to scramble within 5 minutes. Many of the kills achieved by Israeli fighter pilots between 1967 and 1973 were claimed by the Rephidim QRA aircraft, and many pilots sought to be stationed there during times of tension, eager to improve their chances of achieving a victory. The base was also the forward recovery base for any aircraft damaged or low on fuel, as well as the premier medical station for soldiers wounded in the fighting along the Canal, from which they were then ferried to Israel.

Rephidim was permanently at the forefront of fighting between Israel and Egypt during War of Attrition, taking part in every major incident along the Suez Canal, as well as numerous minor ones. On August 26, 1967, a pair of Egyptian Su-7s struck at the field, damaging the main runway. One was shot down by anti-aircraft artillery, while the second evaded the two 119 Squadron Mirages scrambled to intercept it. The first kill by a Rephidim-based aircraft came on October 10, 1967, when Avihu Bin-Nun, leading a pair of 119 Squadron Mirages, shot down an Egyptian MiG-21 over the Sinai. It was the QRA aircraft at Rephidim which provided cover for the rescue efforts following the sinking of INS Eilat, and Mirages from Rephidim also took part in Rimon 20, the July 1970 air battle which saw 5 Soviet-flown MiG-21s shot down.

=== The Yom Kippur War ===
During the Yom Kippur War of 1973, Rephidim was once again at the forefront of fighting between Israel and Egypt. Although a heightened state of alert had been declared throughout the IAF on October 5, Rephidim was ill-prepared for the Egyptian attack which launched the war. 16 Su-7s, escorted by 6 MiG-21s, struck the field at 14:00 on October 6, escaping unharmed. Although the main runway was disabled for four hours, the parallel taxiway was operational within 30 minutes of the attack, allowing Rephidim to join the fighting now raging along the Suez Canal. Two 119 Squadron F-4 Phantoms (the squadron had retired the Mirage in 1970) launched from Rephidim to assist Israeli units under attack, and pilot Moshe Melnik with navigator Zvi Tal shot down an AS-5 Kelt launched by a Tu-16 as well as a Su-7. Later in the afternoon, a mixed pair consisting of a Phantom and an IAI Nesher scrambled from Rephidim to down several Mi-8 helicopters airlifting Egyptian commandos into the Sinai. That same night also saw the IAF deploying several helicopters to Rephidim for medevac (medical evacuation) duties. One Israeli CH-53 was shot down over the field on October 12, killing five crewmen. The Air Base was temporarily put out of service as a result.

=== Israeli withdrawal ===
Following the Camp David Accords, Rephidim was the very first air base from which Israel withdrew in late 1979.

== Current day ==
Although the accords prohibit Egypt from maintaining combat aircraft in the Sinai, Bir Jifjafa is still operational as a dual military and civilian airport. Several derelict C-97s may have remained at Bir Jifjafa upon Israel's departure. The airbase is used to support the Egyptian response to the Sinai insurgency. The base houses Air Tractor AT-802 aircraft. In 2016 and 2017, it was home to CAIG Wing Loong UAVs.

In 2015, it was decided to convert part of the airport to civilian use as part of a plan to develop the Sinai, to be opened in 2019. The conversion process includes the construction of a 3350 meter (2 mile) long and 60 meter (200 foot) wide runway, 2 aircraft tarmacs, and the construction of a 4200 m2 (1 acre) passenger lounge with a capacity of 200 passengers/hour, in addition to service facilities, internal roads, utility networks, and site coordination works. The airport was reopened as an international airport in 2019 under the name Bardawil International Airport.
