= 105 Squadron =

105 Squadron may refer to:

- No. 105 Squadron RAF, a squadron in the Royal Air Force
- 105 Squadron (Israel), a squadron in the Israeli Air Force
