= Bahr El-Baqar primary school bombing =

1970 bombing of a school in an Israeli Air Force strike

Coordinates: 30°51′35″N 31°54′54″E

- Part of War of Attrition, Operation Priha
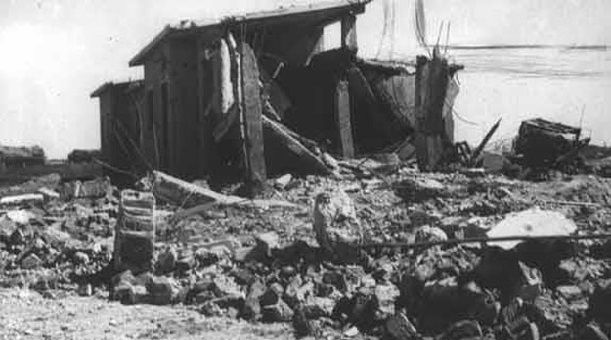
- Ruins of the school after the bombing
- Location: Bahr El-Baqar, Egypt
- Date: 8 April 1970
- Target: School
- Attack type: Aerial bombing
- Deaths: 46
- Injuries: 50+
- Perpetrator: Israeli Air Force
- Motive: Disputed: According to Israel: Accidental strike on a presumed military target.; According to Egypt: Deliberate massacre.

The Bahr el-Baqar primary school in the Egyptian village of Bahr el-Baqar (south of Port Said, in the eastern province of Sharqia) was bombed by the Israeli Air Force on 8 April 1970. Of the 130 children who were attending the school, 46 were killed and over 50 wounded. The school itself was completely demolished. A part of the War of Attrition, the attack was one of a series of airstrikes conducted in Egypt by Israel during Operation Priha. There has been significant dispute between both parties and their allies over the intentionality and motive of the attack and, consequently, its appropriate designation.

== Background and bombing ==
The bombing occurred during the War of Attrition (1967–1970) as part of Operation Priha's deep penetration strategy which aimed to relieve the conflict along the line of contact on the Suez Canal by striking deep targets and to pressure Nasser into a truce. The series of deep penetration strikes also included the earlier bombing of a factory in Abu Zaabal, in which 80 civilian workers were killed, which Israel also claimed to have been a mistake.

The attack was carried out by Israeli Air Force F4 Phantom II fighter bombers, at 9:20 am on Wednesday 8 April. Five bombs and two air-to-ground missiles struck the single-floor school, which consisted of three classrooms.

== Aftermath ==
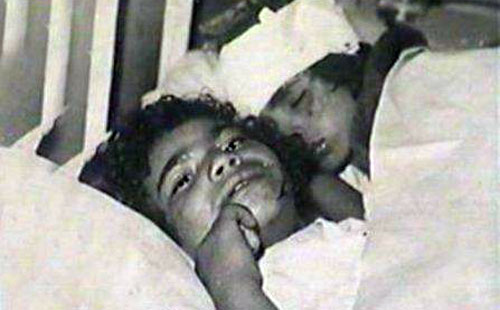
Injured victims

The respective parties and their allies expressed starkly differing views concerning the motive of the attack and, consequently, its appropriate designation. While Egyptian and Arab sources regard the attack as a deliberate massacre and war crime intended to impose a ceasefire, Israeli and Western sources consider it to be a human error on the Israeli side made under the impression that the school was an Egyptian military installation.

The bombing of Bahr El-Baqar was defended by then Defense Minister Moshe Dayan, and Israeli envoy to the UN Yosef Tekoah. When asked about the incident, Moshe Dayan said: "We have checked and re-checked and there was no mistake this time" and "Maybe the Egyptians put elementary students in a military base."

Speaking about the incident, Egyptian commander Abdelatim Ramadan said: "Actually, two targets were hit by the Israelis. The first target was a group of military bases about 30 km from the Suez Canal, which were targeted before, on the night of 18–19 December 1969. The second target was the Bahr El-Baqar primary school."

The townspeople denied that there was any military presence in the town at the time of the bombing.

The attack is considered a contributing factor to Israel's decision to suspend other deep strikes originally planned in operation Priha.

In 2016, reports circulated about prospective reimbursements for the historical killings being planned to further promote Egypt–Israel relations.
