= Operation Priha =

Series of Israeli operations during the War of Attrition

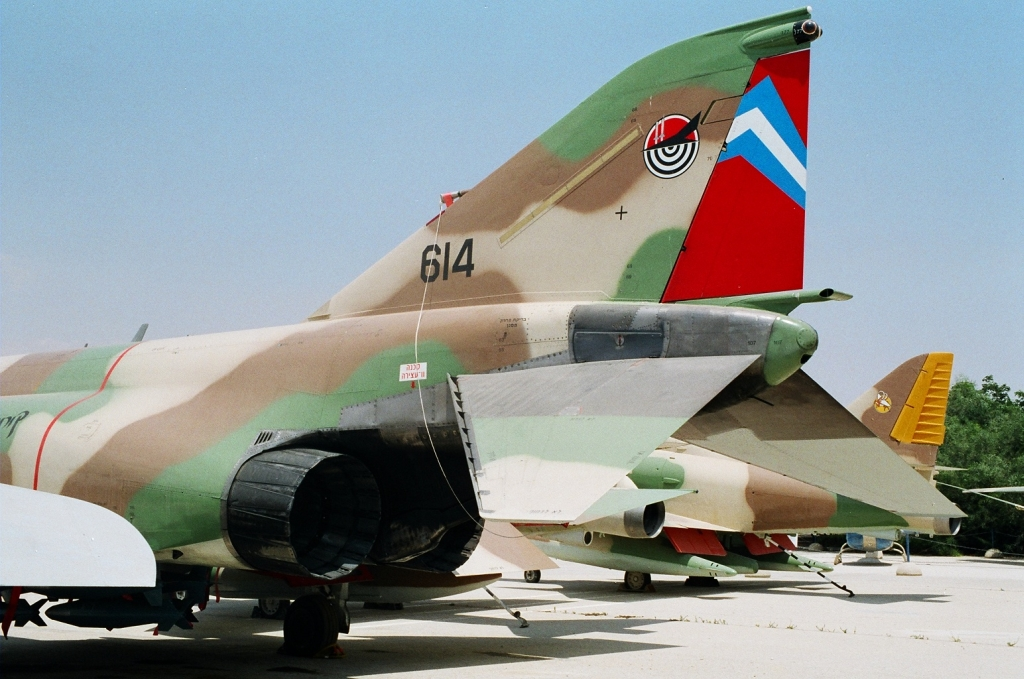
F-4E Phantom II at the Israeli Air Force Museum, bearing the colours of 201 Squadron.

The Priha (Blossom) Operations were a series of strikes undertaken by the Israeli Air Force during the War of Attrition. Taking place between January and April 1970, the operations consisted of 118 sorties against targets in the Egyptian heartland. The strikes were carried out almost exclusively by the F-4 Phantom II, operated at the time only by the 201 "The One" Squadron and the 69 "Hammers" Squadron. Although tactically successful, the operations failed to achieve their objective of pushing the Egyptian government to sue for a ceasefire.

== Background ==
By the end of 1969 Israel had achieved aerial supremacy in its battle with Egyptian air defences along the Suez Canal. Israel, however, was incapable of translating its military achievements into diplomatic gains, and the war continued. To increase Egypt's cost of maintaining the war and compel it to seek a ceasefire, the Israeli government decided to take the war deeper inside Egyptian territory. These strikes were to take place within full view of the Egyptian public, as far as 100 miles from the Canal, with the expectation that mounting public pressure would force President Nasser to seek a ceasefire.

== The operations ==
- Priha 1, January 7 - Two 201 Squadron F-4 Phantom IIs strike an SA-2 operators' school near Helwan, while a 69 Squadron pair attacks Egyptian command posts near Cairo.
- Priha 2, January 13 - Four 115 Squadron A-4 Skyhawks attack an Egyptian army camp in the Delta region, another quartet strikes barracks near the City of Suez, two 109 Squadron A-4s attack barracks near Tall al Kabir, and two 201 Squadron Phantoms strike a signal camp.
- Priha 3, January 18 - Two 201 Squadron Phantoms strike an ammunition factory at Jebel Huf, north of Helwan, while a 69 Squadron pair strikes an ammunition dump 10 km west of Cairo.
- Priha 4, January 23 - Two 201 Squadron Phantoms strike an ammunition dump 10 km west of Cairo, the same one struck five days earlier.
- Priha 5, January 28 - Two Phantom pairs, one from each F-4 squadron (69 & 201) strike missile bases at Dahshur, south of Cairo. Another 69 Squadron pair attacks an army base 5 km south east of Cairo.
- Priha 6, February 2 - A pair of Phantoms from 201 Squadron attack Egyptian army bases near Asyut, in upper Egypt. Several MiGs are scrambled to intercept the Israeli raiders but are too far away to intervene. A 69 Squadron pair attack a P-12 radar station at Baltim.
- Priha 7, February 6 - Two 201 Squadron Phantoms strike barracks near Gandela, upper Egypt. A 69 Squadron pair returns to Tall al Kabir in the Delta region.
- Priha 8, February 8 - Two 69 Squadron Phantoms strike a naval commando base while a 201 pair attacks army warehouses near Helwan. Egyptian Air Force MiG-21s are scrambled from nearby Inshas, and in the ensuing dogfight two are shot down - one by an F-4 and another by a 119 Squadron Mirage III scrambled to the scene.
- Priha 9, February 12 - 201 Squadron Phantoms attack Egyptian radar facilities at Jebel Obeid, while a 69 Squadron pair is sent to attack army bases at Hanca. Mistaken identification of the target results in the bombing of a metal foundry at Abu Zabel and the killing of 70 Egyptian workers. Israeli defence minister Moshe Dayan informs Egyptian authorities, through the Red Cross, of a delayed detonation bomb at the site, and the Israeli government prohibits strikes against targets within a range of 20 km from the center of Cairo. Later in the day, two 201 Squadron F-4s strike army bases at Dahshur again, while a 69 Squadron pair destroys a radar facility at Abu Suweir.
- Priha 10, February 17 - two 201 Squadron F-4s strike an SA-2 battery near Dahshur.
- Priha 11, February 26 - two 201 Squadron Phantoms strike an SA-2 battery and training facility near the air base at Cairo-West. MiG-21s are scrambled to intercept the raiders but break off when Israeli Mirages arrive on the scene. Later that same day two 69 Squadron F-4s attack another SAM battery in the delta, and are once again challenged by Egyptian MiGs. The attacking pair are withdrawn, but a 201 pair and four 119 Squadron Mirages on patrol are directed against the Egyptian interceptors. Three MiGs are downed by the Mirages for no loss, though Egypt claims the destruction of three Israeli aircraft.
- Priha 12, March 6 - Four Phantoms, two from each F-4 squadron, strike an SA-2 battery near El Mansourah and a radar facility near Domyat.
- Priha 13, March 13 - Two 201 Squadron F-4s attack a radar facility at Ras Obeid.
- Priha 14, March 17/18 - strikes by both squadrons against targets at Tall el Kabir and Helwan are called off.
- Priha 15, March 23 - A radar facility at Baltim is struck by two 69 Squadron Phantoms.
- Priha 16, March 26 - Two 69 Squadron F-4s attack a SAM site at Qassasin.
- Priha 17, March 31 - Four 201 Squadron F-4s joined by a single 69 Squadron bird attack SAM sites near El Mansourah.
- Priha 18, April 3 - Four 69 Squadron Phantoms strike SAM sites near El Mansourah again.
- Priha 19, April 8 - Four 201 Squadron Phantoms bombed a primary school near Bahr el Baqar, killing 47 children. Israel said the target was an Egyptian army headquarters.
- Priha 20, April 10 - Originally intended to be a part of Priha 19, two 201 Squadron Phantoms attack a radar facility at Wadi Zur.
- Priha 21, April 13 - An SA-2 base near Manzala is struck by a 69 Squadron pair, while two 201 Squadron birds strike at a radar facility near Wadi Zur.

== Aftermath ==
The expanding Soviet presence in Egypt and the increased likelihood of a confrontation with Soviet forces prompted the Israeli government to call off the Priha operations. Despite inflicting considerable damage on Egypt, the bombing campaign only brought the Egyptian public together behind their government. Instead of bringing Egypt to the negotiating table, it had quite the opposite effect. Humiliated and angry, Nasser turned to Moscow for additional support and weapons, drawing the Soviet Union further into the conflict. Instead of facilitating a ceasefire, the Priha operations in fact increased tensions and led to further escalation in the War of Attrition.

In his memoirs, Yitzhak Rabin, at the time Israel's Ambassador to the U.S., reports that he urged the Israeli government to initiate Operation Priha and credits the strikes inside Egypt with fortifying the United States in their negotiations with the Soviets. He writes, "From then on, the American Administration was gradually to shake free of the depressing feeling that it was backing the loser in the Middle East".
