= 201 Squadron (Israel) =

Israeli military unit

- טייסת האחת
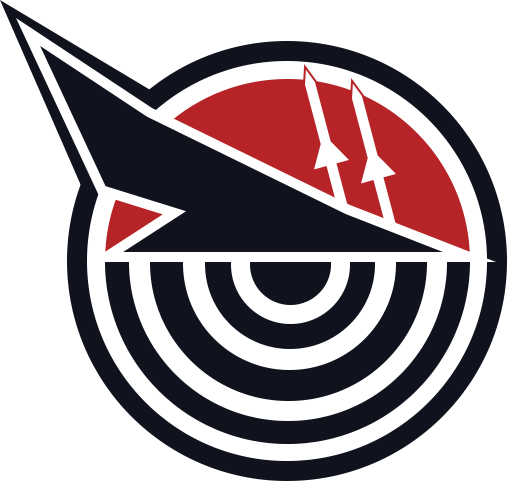
- Active: 1969–2004, 2008–Present
- Country: Israel
- Branch: Israeli Air Force
- Garrison/HQ: Ramon Airbase
- Nickname(s): The One
- Engagements: War of Attrition Yom Kippur War; Operation Litani 1982 Lebanon War

Commanders
- Notable commanders: Shmuel Hetz; Eitan Ben-Eliyahu; Ron Huldai; Aviem Sella; Amir Eshel

Aircraft flown
- Attack: F-4 Phantom II
- Fighter: F-16 Fighting Falcon

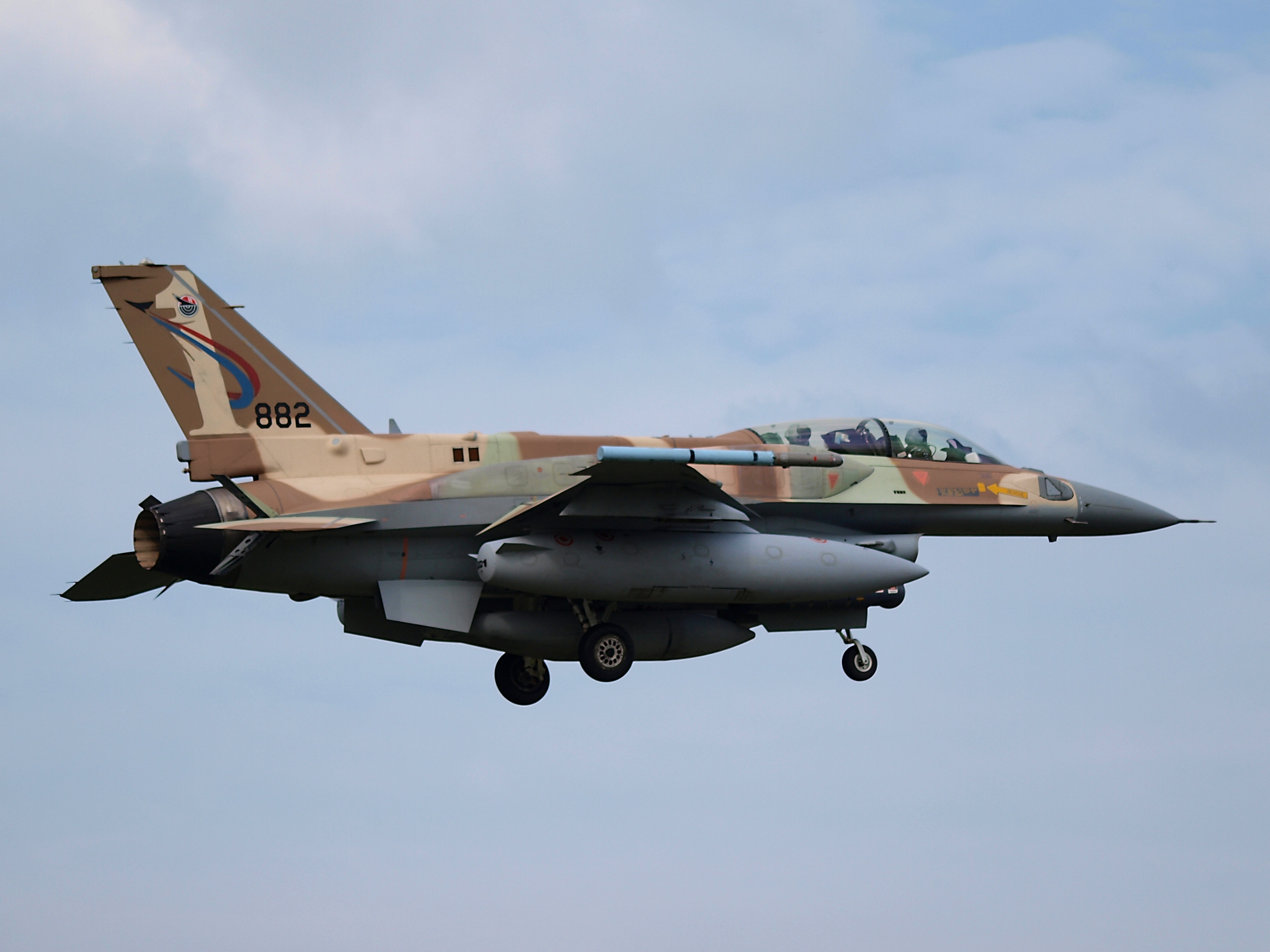
A 201 Squadron F-16I Soufa '882' arriving at Kecskemét Air Show

The 201 Squadron of the Israeli Air Force, also known as The One, is an F-16I fighter squadron based at Ramon Airbase.

== See also ==
- Operation Priha
- Operation Doogman 5
