= David Ivry =

Israeli diplomat and businessman

- דוד עברי
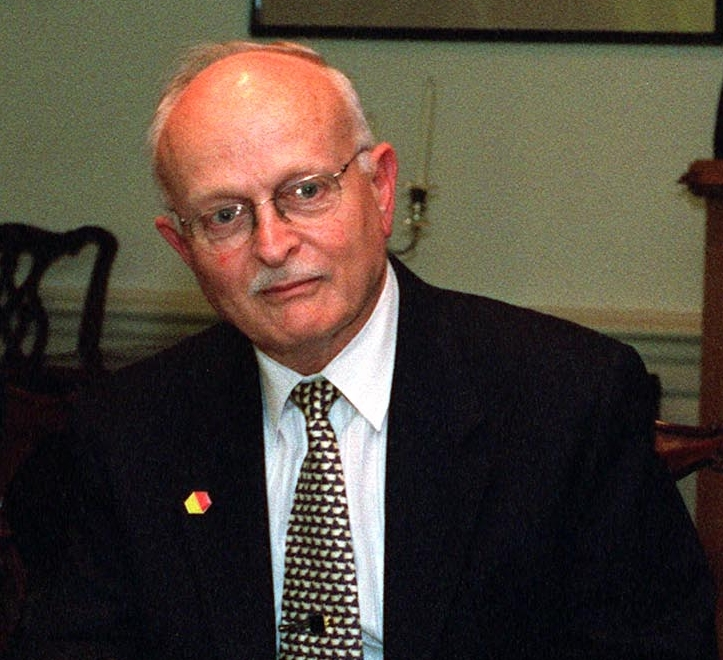
- Ivry in October 2001

Israeli Ambassador to the United States
- In office 2000–2002
- Preceded by: Zalman Shoval
- Succeeded by: Daniel Ayalon

1st National Security Advisor (Israel)
- In office March 1999 – January 2000
- Preceded by: Inaugural holder
- Succeeded by: Uzi Dayan

Personal details
- Born: 1934 (age 91–92) Tel Aviv, Mandate Palestine
- Military career
- Allegiance: State of Israel
- Branch: Israel Defense Forces
- Service years: 1952–1982
- Rank: Aluf (Major General)
- Commands: Commander of the flight-instruction school at Tel Nof Airbase, Commander of the first Israeli squadron of the French Dassault Mirage, Commander of the Israeli Air Force
- Conflicts: Suez Crisis; Six-Day War; War of Attrition; 1982 Lebanon War; South Lebanon conflict
- Other work: Director of the Israeli National Security Council

David Elkana Ivry (Hebrew: דוד אלקנה עברי; born 1934) is a Major General (retired) in the Israeli Defense Forces (IDF). As commander of the Israeli Air Force (IAF) he played a key role in Operation Opera, the destruction of the Iraqi nuclear reactor located 990 miles (1,590 km) from Israel, in 1981. In 1999, Ivry was appointed first director of the Israeli National Security Council. From 2003 to 2021, he served as the Vice President of Boeing International and president of Boeing Israel. Ivry was the Israeli Ambassador to the United States from 2000 to 2002.

== Early life ==
David Ivry was born in Tel Aviv to Abraham and Shoshana Kruiz, immigrants from Czechoslovakia. He grew up in Gedera. In 1952 he was recruited to the Israeli Air Force to flight course No. 14, where he served as a pilot of a P-51 Mustang. Following the Czech-Egyptian arms deal, he decided to continue his service in the IAF.

== Airforce career ==
In 1956 he was sent to a special flight-instructors course in the UK, and became an instructor in the IAF's academy in Tel Nof Airbase. During the Sinai Campaign he served as an Ouragan pilot. In 1957 he was appointed as deputy commander of the 113th squadron. In 1959 he ejected from his Dassault Super Mystère during an engagement with an Egyptian Mig-17.

In 1960 he was appointed commander of the basic squadron at the IAF academy, and in 1961 he was a member of the IAF delegation to France to onboard the IAF's Mirage III fighters. In 1962, he became the deputy commander of the first Israeli squadron of the French Dassault Mirage. In 1963 he was appointed as commander of the 109th Mystere squadron, and in 1964 he became commander of the 117th squadron, the first jet squadron in the IAF. In 1966 he became commander of the IAF academy and its first commander after the move from Tel Nof base to Hazerim base.

In the Six-Day War, Ivry served as a Mirage pilot and the commander of the Mystère squadron. In October 1968 he became head of the Air Division 3 and in 1969 was promoted to colonel. In 1970 he became commander of the Tel Nof base. In 1977 he was promoted to major general and from October 1977 to December 1982, he served as the ninth commander of the IAF. While he was in command, the IAI bases were moved from Sinai to the Negev, the air force took part in Operation Litani and Operation Opera. He was in command of Operation Mole Cricket 19 in the early stages of the 1982 Lebanon War.

== Public service and diplomatic career ==
In 1982 he left the service and became Chairman of the Israeli Aerospace Industry (IAI) for a short period. In 1983 he returned to service and become deputy Head of the General Staff and Head of the IDFs Operations Division. in 1985 he was appointed again as Chairman of the IAI and during 1986-1996 was the Director General of the Ministry of Defense. He served as head of the Israeli National Security Counsel between March 1999 - January 2000.

In 2002-2002, Ivry was Israel's ambassador to the United States.

On September 2, 2003, Boeing named Ivry as vice president of Boeing International and president of Boeing Israel. He represented the company’s business interests and coordinated company-wide business activities in Israel. He retired in 2021 and was succeeded by Ido Nehoshtan, who also served as the commander of the Israeli Air Force (2008-2012).

== Personal life ==
Ivry resides in Ramat Hasharon. He is married to Ofra, with whom he has 3 children. His son, Gil Ivry, was an F-16 pilot who died in a training accident in 1987. In 2008 he was awarded honorary member of his home town, Ramat Hasharon.

== Awards and honors ==
=== Domestic ===

Brigade Commander citation	Sinai War	Six-Day War	War of Attrition	Yom Kippur War	First Lebanon War

- Honorary doctorate from Technion (1996)
- Honorary doctorate from Bar-Ilan University
- Amitai Distinction Award
- Begin Prize (2022)

=== Foreign ===
- Singapore:
  - Recipient of the Darjah Utama Bakti Cemerlang (Tentera) (1999)
- United States:
  - Commander of the Legion of Merit (1981)
