= Operation Mole Cricket 19 =

1982 Israeli Air Force campaign in Lebanon

- Part of the 1982 Lebanon War and the Lebanese Civil War
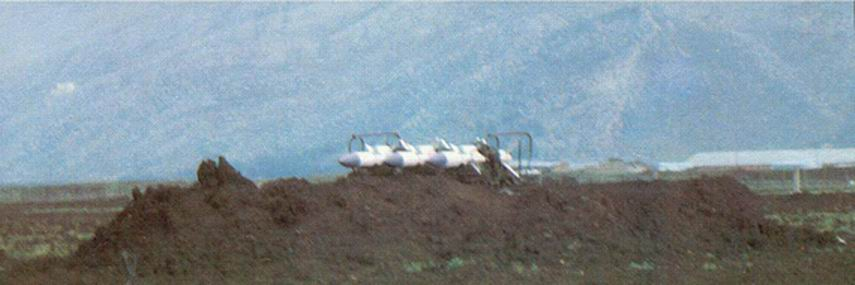
- Part of a Syrian SA-6 site built near the Beirut-Damascus highway, and overlooking the Beqaa Valley, in early 1982.
Date	June 9, 1982
Location	Beqaa Valley, Lebanon
Result	Decisive Israeli victory

Belligerents
Israel (IAF)	Syria (SAAF)

Commanders and leaders
(Israel) David Ivry (Israel) Ariel Sharon	(Ba'athist Syria) Mustafa Tlass (Ba'athist Syria) Hafez al-Assad

Strength
90 aircraft (mostly F-15s and F-16s); 1 remotely piloted vehicle squadron Unmanned aerial vehicles (UAV)	100 aircraft (mostly ground attack MiG-21 and MiG-23, some MiG-23M air-to-air fighters); 30 SAM batteries

Casualties and losses
2 F-15 damaged At least 1 UAV shot down	82–86 planes shot down 29 SAM batteries destroyed

Operation Mole Cricket 19 (Hebrew: מבצע ערצב-19, romanized: Mivtza ʻArtzav Tsha-Esreh) was a suppression of enemy air defenses (SEAD) campaign launched by the Israeli Air Force (IAF) against Syrian targets on June 9, 1982, at the outset of the 1982 Lebanon War. The operation was the first time in history that a Western-equipped air force successfully destroyed a Soviet-built surface-to-air missile (SAM) network. It also became one of the biggest air battles since World War II, and the biggest since the Korean War. The result was a decisive Israeli victory.

The IAF began working on a SAM suppression operation at the end of the Yom Kippur War. Rising tensions between Israel and Syria over Lebanon escalated in the early 1980s and culminated in Syria deploying SAM batteries in the Beqaa Valley. On June 6, 1982, Israel invaded Lebanon, and on the third day of the war, with clashes ongoing between the Israel Defense Forces (IDF) and the Syrian Army, Israel decided to launch the operation.

The battle lasted about two hours, and involved innovative tactics and technology. By the end of the day, the IAF had destroyed 29 of 30 SAM batteries deployed in the Beqaa Valley, and shot down 82–86 enemy aircraft, with minimal losses of its own. The battle led the United States to impose a ceasefire on Israel and Syria.

== Background ==
=== Aftermath of the Yom Kippur War ===
In the Yom Kippur War of 1973, Egypt had 20 mobile SA-6 SAM systems, backed up by 70 SA-2s, 65 SA-3s, and upward of 2,500 anti-aircraft batteries and about 3,000 SA-7s. Syria deployed another 34 SAM batteries. Operation Model 5, a hastily executed IAF attempt to take out the SAM batteries near the Golan Heights early in the fighting was unsuccessful, with catastrophic results for the attacking force. In total, during the first three days of the war, the IAF lost 50 aircraft in about 1,220 sorties, a loss rate of four percent.

The SA-6s, SA-7s, and ZSU-23-4 guns hit 53 of Israel's prewar total of 170 A-4 Skyhawks and 33 of its 177 F-4 Phantoms. As a result, the IAF found it difficult to provide air support to the ground troops. When Egypt tried to push beyond the range of its SAM batteries on October 14, it lost 28 aircraft while Israel won a significant land battle. Between 1973 and 1978, the IAF undertook a major project to try to find an answer to the SAM threat.

The losses suffered by Israel in the 1973 war were so high that it indirectly spawned the United States stealth aircraft program, Project HAVE BLUE. The U.S. estimated that without a solution to the SAM problem, even the United States would suffer depletion of its Air Force within two weeks of a conflict erupting between the U.S. and Soviet Union. The Israelis had lost 109 aircraft in 18 days.

On May 28, 1980, IAF guided missiles destroyed two armored cars carrying SA-9 batteries, manned by Libyan troops, near Sidon. The Israeli media declared that a solution to the SAM problem was found, but the IAF Commander, David Ivry, said that this assessment was premature, and that the SA-9 was not really significantly superior to its predecessors. The Prime Minister, Menachem Begin, then also Minister of Defense, announced that the IAF could destroy the SAM batteries in two hours. Ivry told the media that the IAF could do nothing of the kind.

=== 1981 SAM crisis ===
On April 28, 1981, the IAF (F-16A fighters from 117 Squadron at Ramat David air base) shot down two Syrian helicopters over Lebanon. Syria responded by deploying its first SAM brigades to the Beqaa Valley. The SAM batteries were not a direct strategic threat to Israel, and there were already several Syrian SAM batteries in east Lebanon, across the border. Begin faced a dilemma: on one hand, the new deployment damaged Israel's deterrence credibility and, on the other hand, a strike might lead to an unnecessary clash with Syria. Eventually, he decided on an attack, to be launched on April 30, but the operation was called off due to weather conditions.

By the time the weather cleared, the IAF was preoccupied with preparations for Operation Opera. Meanwhile, the United States was concerned that Soviet reaction to an Israeli strike might lead to a crisis between the superpowers, and pressured Begin not to attack. Israel agreed to cancel the strike, and an American envoy, Philip Habib, was sent to the region as a mediator. He shuttled between Jerusalem and Damascus but failed to get the SAM batteries removed.

On December 14, Israel passed the Golan Heights Law which annexed the Golan Heights to Israel. The Syrian President, Hafez al-Assad, considered it a declaration of war, but believed that Syria was in no condition to fight it. The law subjected Israel to severe American and international criticism. On December 20, the Cabinet of Israel convened for a weekly meeting, in which Defense Minister Ariel Sharon and the Chief of Staff (Ramatkal) Rafael Eitan presented the "Big Plan" for an invasion of Lebanon, which included seizure of the Beirut-Damascus Highway. Begin supported the plan, but other members of the Cabinet opposed and he decided to cancel it.

The SAM suppression operation was originally called "Mole 3", but the figure increased in respect to the number of SAM batteries detected, eventually reaching 19. At this point the name was changed to "Mole Cricket", after the name of the plan for a general war since 1973, in order to prepare the force psychologically. The name was first revealed in 2002.

== Prelude ==
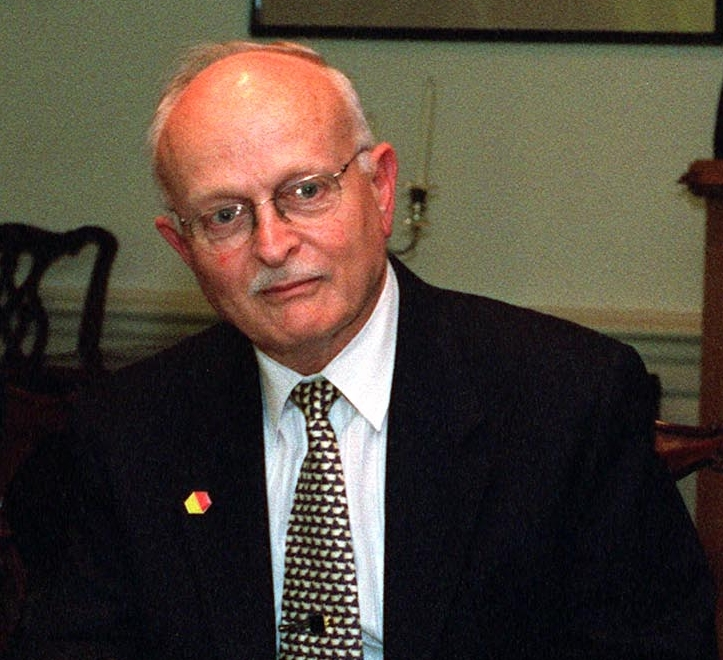
David Ivry.

On Tuesday June 8, 1982, while Israeli forces were advancing on Jezzine, Begin addressed part of his statement in the Knesset to the Syrians, urging them not to intervene in the war and saying, inter alia, that: "I once again state that we do not want a war with Syria. From this platform I call on President Assad to instruct the Syrian army not to harm Israeli soldiers and then nothing bad will happen to [Syrian soldiers]. We desire no clashes with the Syrian army, if we reach the line 40 km from our northern border the work will have been done, all fighting will end. I am directing my words to the ears of the President of Syria. He knows how to keep an agreement. He signed a cease-fire with us and kept it. He did not allow the terrorists to act. If he behaves in this manner now in Lebanon, no Syrian soldier will be harmed by our soldiers".

That night, while the Battle of Jezzine was raging in central Lebanon, Sharon said at a meeting in the Northern Command headquarters "We know today that there will be a direct confrontation with the Syrians" and argued that it would be best to move deeper into Lebanon. At 11:00 PM the IDF entered Ein Zahalta and were caught in a battle against a Syrian division, which halted its advance. Sharon used this as his principal argument for launching Mole Cricket 19.

Yekutiel Adam, former Deputy Chief of Staff and designated Head of the Mossad, voiced his concern that the Cabinet was not fully aware of the war's scope and objective. Nevertheless, Sharon gave North Command chief, Amir Drori, a go-ahead to drive on the Beqaa Valley, and Deputy Chief of Staff Moshe Levi flew to Ein Zahalta to tell the commander, Menachem Einan, that the IAF would attack the Syrian missiles that day.

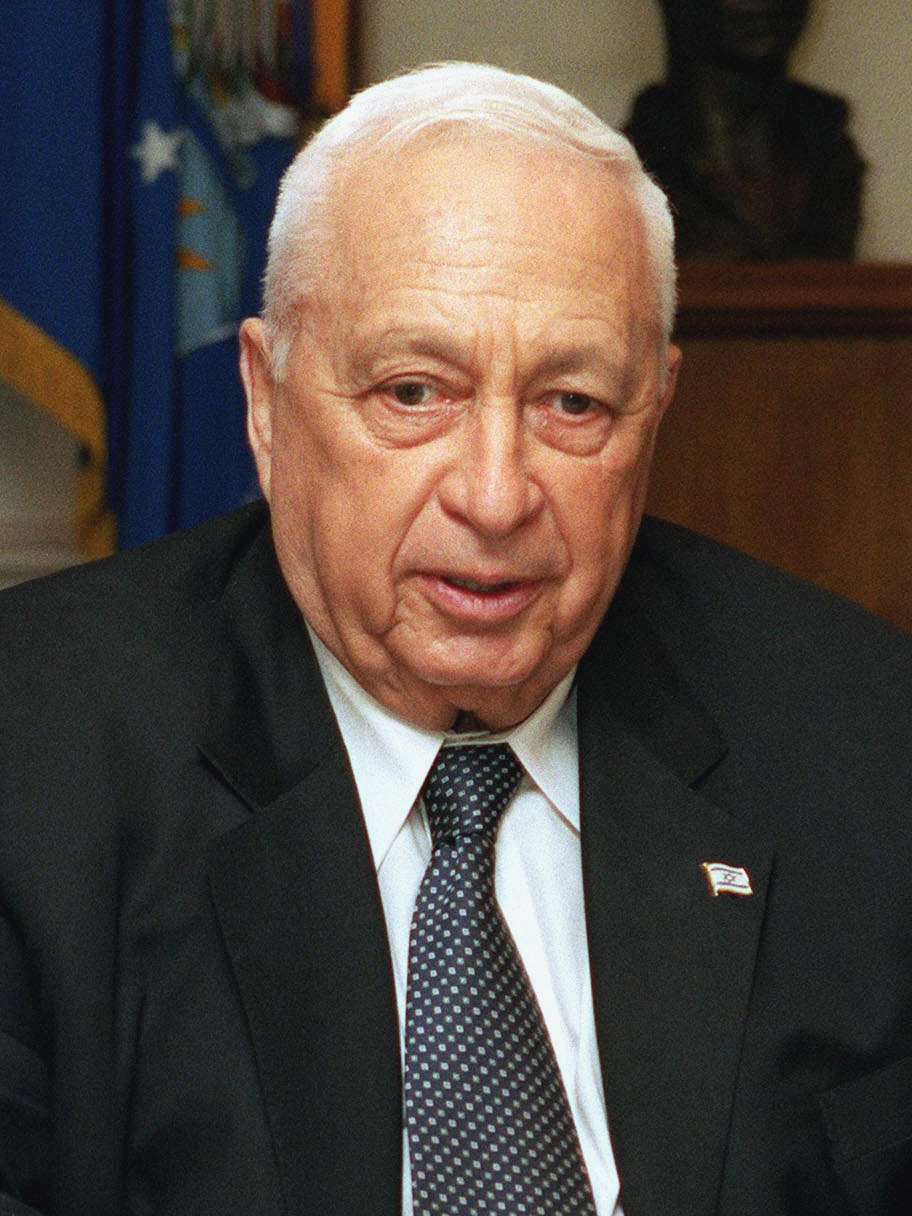
Ariel Sharon.

Meanwhile, Ivry learned that unmanned aerial vehicles had spotted an additional five SA-6s moving from the Golan Heights into the Beqaa Valley. The IAF interpreted that move as a signal that Syria had no intention of becoming involved in a major war—otherwise the SAMs would have been positioned to defend the approach to Damascus. The redeployment suggested to Ivry that they could strike the SAM sites without risking an all-out war with Syria.

Sharon flew back to Jerusalem to attend a Cabinet meeting on Wednesday, June 9. He said Syria had already begun moving an additional armored division (the 3rd Armoured Division) south from Ein Zahalta. The political timetable dictated that waiting until Thursday would not leave enough time for a ground advance. Drori, who came with Sharon to the meeting, was against the attack, saying it was superfluous. Eitan was ambivalent, preferring to limit the attack to a signal to the Syrians. The Communications Minister, Mordechai Tzipori, argued that Sharon's plan had exceeded the original forty-kilometer line. Sharon replied that the line had to be measured from Israel's northernmost point, Metula. He added that destroying the missile batteries in the Beqaa was necessary to save the force at Ein Zahalta.

The Interior Minister, Yosef Burg, pointed out that a fight against the Syrians seemed imminent, in contrast to what the Cabinet wanted, and that attacking the missiles would only aggravate things and lead to an all-out war. Sharon stressed the vulnerability of the soldiers in the field. Begin turned to Ivry's deputy, Amos Amir, and asked for his projection of the IAF's losses in such an attack. Amir replied "I cannot promise no losses whatsoever, but they will be minimal". Begin supported the attack and eventually Burg was also convinced. Sharon left the conference and issued an order for an air strike as well as a ground operation.

== Battle ==
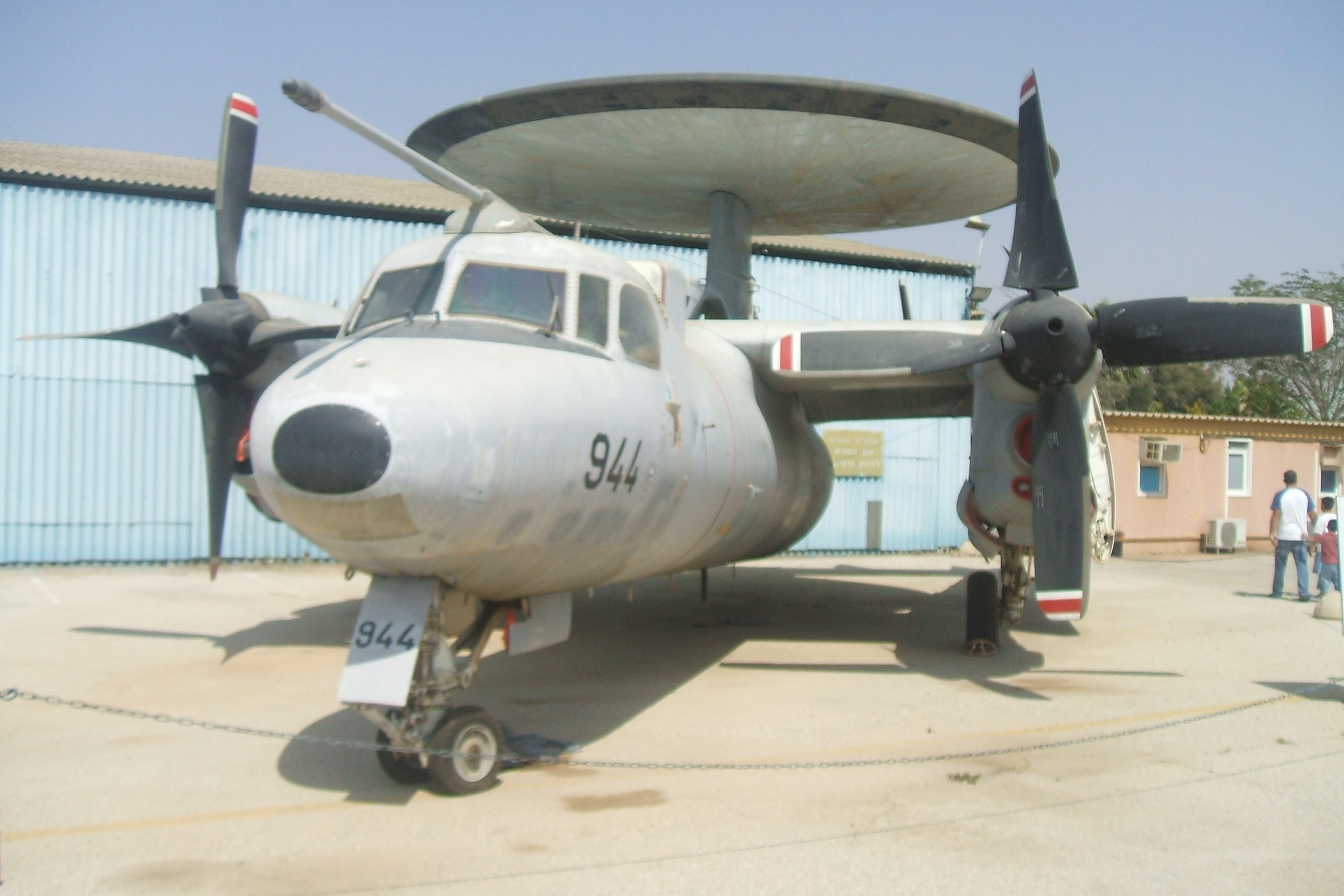
IAF Grumman E-2C Hawkeye in the Israeli Air Force Museum in Hatzerim Airbase.

On the morning of June 9, the IAF aircraft over Lebanon were operating at three levels. Kfirs and Skyhawks were along the coastline from Sidon to the outskirts of Beirut, providing close air support for the ground troops and striking at Palestine Liberation Organization targets. At the second level, over 10,000 feet (3,000 m), similar formations were circling and awaiting orders. At the top level, Hawkeyes were stationed to ensure air control. The first task force aircraft attacked the Syrian radar at the top of Jebel Baruk, which was commanding a large area.

Ivry received the green light at 10:00 AM to execute the operation, but by then he had postponed the attack until 2:00 PM. At 1:30 PM, Eitan ordered Ivry to strike, and the Israeli aircraft took off in pairs. The first wave was made up of 96 F-15s and F-16s. The second wave which attacked the SAM batteries at 3:50 PM was made up of 92 aircraft. When the attack was launched, the Syrians ordered their combat air patrols to return to base and land.

IAF aircraft carried electronic countermeasures pods to disrupt radar tracking. The IAF command post in Tel Aviv provided Ivry a real-time command picture of the air battle through various data links. E-2Cs with airborne surveillance radar down-linked their pictures to the command post. A squadron of Tadiran Mastiff and IAI Scout Remotely Piloted Vehicles (RPV) kept at least two vehicles in the air all the time, providing constant location of the SAM batteries. A two-way voice communications link between Ivry and his pilots was set up, allowing for real-time command.

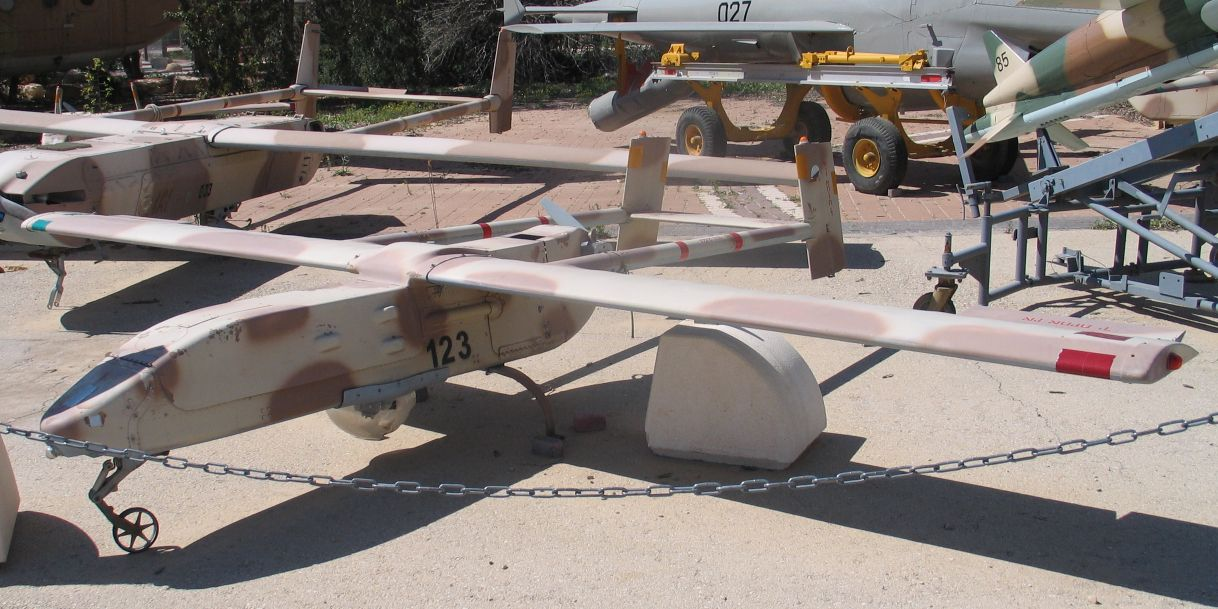
An IAI Scout UAV in the IAF Museum

The primary Syrian fighters involved were MiG-21, with considerable numbers of MiG-23s and Su-20s also deployed. Syrian aircraft depended on ground-controlled interception (GCI) sites for command and control. The SAM sites were a combination of SA-2s, SA-3s, and SA-6s. The IAF's F-15s, F-16s, F-4s, and Kfirs were equipped with AIM-7F Sparrow radar-guided missiles, AIM-9L Sidewinder infrared-guided missiles, and computer-aimed 20-mm cannons. The F-15s and F-16s were equipped with a head-up display (HUD) system.

The Mastiff RPVs went in first to cause the Syrian SAMs to turn on their radars by convincing the Syrians that many attack aircraft were overhead. Once the Mastiffs were tracked by Syrian radar, the tracking signals were relayed to another Scout outside of the missiles' range. The Scout then relayed the signal to E2C Hawkeye aircraft orbiting off the coast. The data gathered was analyzed by the E2Cs and Boeing 707 ECM aircraft. Once the SAM crews fired missiles at the drones, the F-15s and F-16s provided air cover while F-4 Phantoms attacked the SAM batteries, destroying them with AGM-78 and AGM-45 anti-radiation missiles. The rapid flight time of the missiles minimized the F-4s' exposure to the SAMs. The Syrians reportedly fired 57 SA-6s, to no effect.

According to Ivry, many of the SAM batteries were on the Syrian side of the border. Said Eitan, "From the operational point of view I can say that we used the mini-RPVs, long before the war, to identify and locate all the Syrian missile batteries. We then used superior electronic devices which enabled us to "blind" or neutralize the missile sites' ground-to-air radar. We rendered them ineffective to take reliable fixes on our aircraft aloft. But in advance of direct aerial attacks, we used long-range artillery".

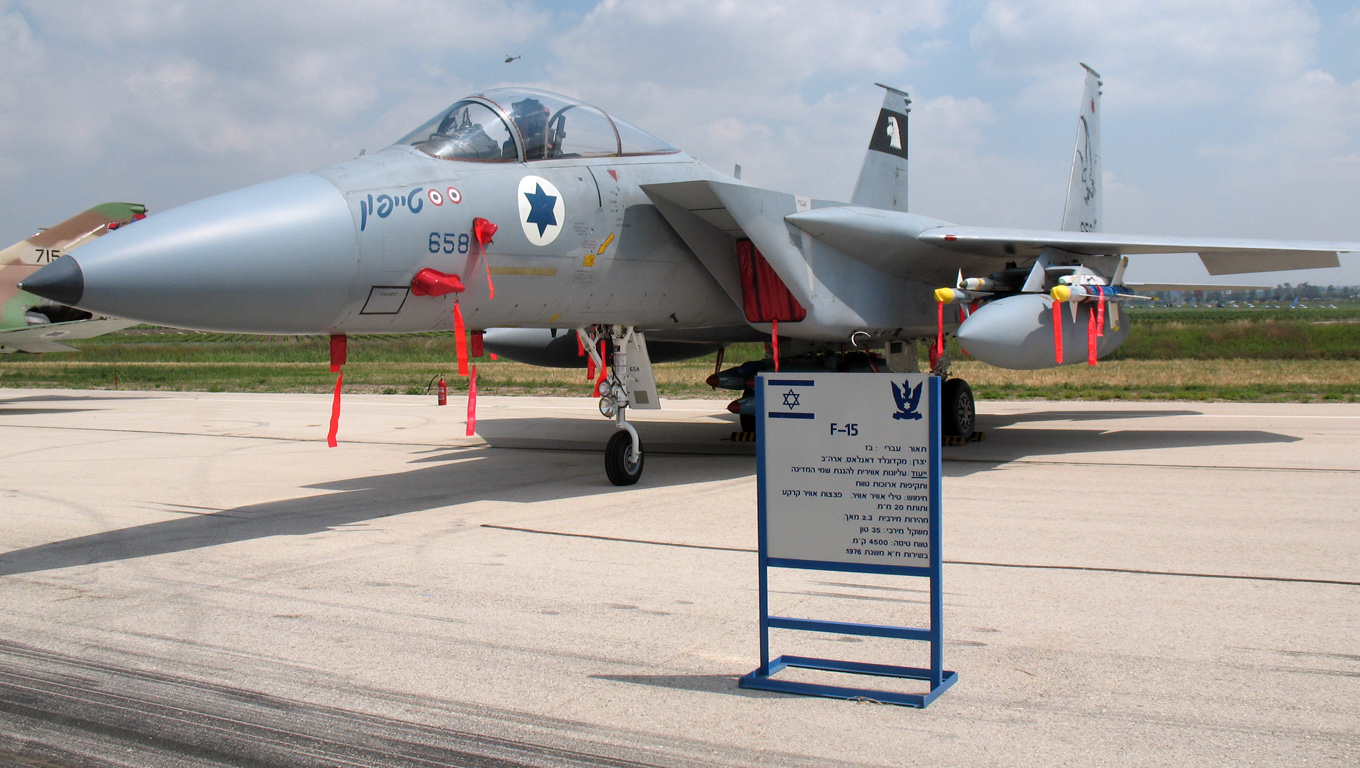
IAF F-15 at Tel Nof Airbase, marked for shooting down two Syrian aircraft

The Syrians responded by launching about 100 fighter aircraft to stop the attacks. Intercepting IAF pilots relied frequently on VHF radio, in hopes of preserving their tactical communications and links to the command post. Selective airborne communications jamming disrupted the airwaves for the MiG-21s and MiG-23s and cut them off from ground control, making them vulnerable to AWACS-directed attacks from the Israeli F-15s and F-16s.

The IAF positioned RPVs over three major airfields in Syria to report when and how many Syrian aircraft were taking off. The data was transmitted to the E-2Cs. The IAF took advantage of the fact that the MiGs had only nose and tail alert radar systems and no side warnings or look-up and look-down systems, by jamming the GCI communications net. E-2Cs guided the Israeli aircraft into positions that enabled them to attack the Syrian aircraft from the side, where the latter would have no warning.

Because of the jamming, Syrian GCI controllers could not direct their pilots toward the incoming Israeli aircraft. The Sparrow missiles attacked at speeds of Mach 3.5 at ranges of 22 to 40 km (14 to 25 mi), which meant that they were not only outside the Syrians' radar range but also outside their visual range. The Sidewinders' "head-on" capabilities at close range gave the Israelis firepower advantage.

Discussing the Syrian response to the attacks, Eitan said: "The first reaction of the Syrians when we attacked their missiles was to scramble their air forces... any [Syrian fighter pilots] who crossed an imaginary line in the direction of our forces was destroyed, shot down. The imaginary line was actually the range of the missile batteries in Syria proper. The basic tactic of the Syrian air force is to take to the air and to cross this imaginary line, which brings them outside the protective range of their home-based missiles. They do what they can, then run back for cover."

Near 4:00 PM, with fourteen batteries destroyed and an hour left until dark, Ivry decided to call off the operation, assuming the optimal result had been achieved and that the Syrians would move more SAMs into place the next day. The operation was stopped shortly after 4:00 PM. Colonel Aviem Sella, a member of the operation staff, later said that Sharon severely criticized that decision.

== Aftermath ==
That night, the IAF destroyed the Syrian Army's 47th Armored Brigade north of Baalbek as it was moving south, and the following day, the IAF destroyed six other SAM batteries, two that remained from the operation and four that the Syrians moved into the Beqaa Valley that night. Syrian Defense Minister Mustafa Tlass told Assad that "the Syrian Air Force was outclassed, the ground-to-air missiles useless, and that without air cover, the army could not fight on".

Sharon later said that "If we had tolerated that development, the Syrian armored forces would have consisted of 600 tanks protected by an extensive missile umbrella. Their missile batteries fired at our planes. We had no choice other than to approve a military operation to destroy the missile buildup". He called the operation "the turning point" in the invasion. A senior IAF officer, widely believed to be Ivry himself, later said that "Syrian aircraft were fighting from a disadvantage, having to respond to the Israeli threat wherever and whenever it materialized, within a general strategic and tactical situation not in Syria's favor."

Tzipori later wrote in his book that Sharon had been planning the attack since the eve of the war, but tricked the Cabinet into believing that the confrontation with the Syrians was unexpected. Sharon maintained that on June 6 he had ordered the IDF not to cross the Awali River and to avoid a confrontation with the Syrians. Sharon said he did order the army to prepare for a contingency plan, however, to drive on the Beirut-Damascus highway in case the Syrians attacked first. Eitan claimed that on the night before the operation, he had agreed with Sharon to prepare the IAF for the attack, in case the Cabinet approved it. Senior Israeli commanders said after the operation that Operation Peace for Galilee could have been achieved without confronting the Syrians.

On Wednesday, Assad sent Tlass to Moscow to seek a comprehensive air umbrella. The Soviets refused but prepared large amounts of military equipment at airfields for dispatch to Syria and sent Marshal Pavel Kutakhov to Syria to find out what happened to the Syrian SAMs, fearing that NATO might do the same in Eastern Europe. On June 9, Assad met with American envoy Habib in Damascus and rejected his terms, demanding that Israel withdraw its forces from Lebanon as a condition for a ceasefire.

US President Ronald Reagan called on Begin and Assad to accept a ceasefire effective at 6:00 a.m., on June 10. By noon on Friday, when the ceasefire took effect, the IAF had shot down 82 aircraft without losing any in air combat. A year after the battle, a US fact-finding mission headed by Lieutenant General John Chain, then U.S. Air Force deputy chief of staff for plans and operations, arrived in Israel to learn lessons from the battle.

The Soviet military newspaper Krasnaya Zvezda announced that "sixty-seven Israeli aircraft, including modern US-made F-15 and F-16 fighters, were downed" in the fighting. The newspaper also reported a meeting with a Syrian airman who recounted an engagement in which he shot down an Israeli F-15: "The victory had not been easy; the enemy had been subtle". Even within Soviet ranks, these claims met with great skepticism. In 1991, Ivry met a Czech general who had been serving in Moscow in 1982. He told Ivry that the operation made the Soviets understand that Western technology was superior to theirs, and that in his view, the blow to the Beqaa Valley SAMs was an impetus to glasnost and the Soviet Union's collapse.

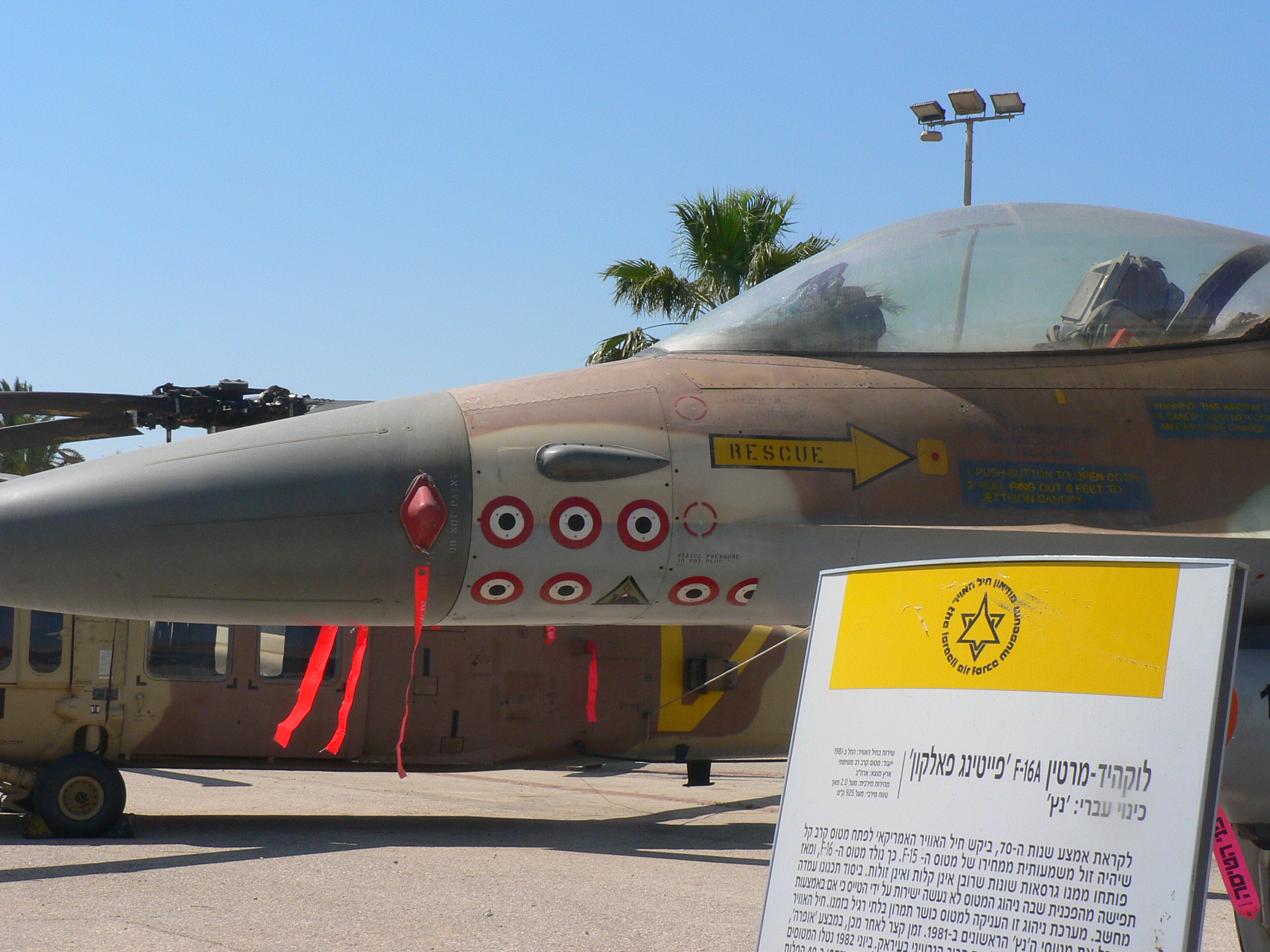
IAF F-16 "Netz" that shot down seven Syrian aircraft

The IAF Roundel for the F-4Es that took part in the operation.
