= 105 Squadron (Israel) =

Israeli military unit

- טייסת העקרב
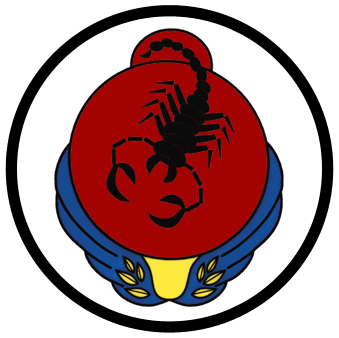
- The Scorpion Squadron
- Active: December 1950-present
- Country: Israel
- Branch: Israeli Air Force
- Role: Air Defence
- Garrison/HQ: Ramat David Airbase

Aircraft flown
- Fighter: F-16D

The 105 Squadron of the Israeli Air Force, also known as The Scorpion, operates F-16Ds from Ramat David Airbase.

== History ==
The squadron was founded in December 1950 as a Spitfire squadron. It has since operated the P-51 Mustang, Dassault Super Mystere, IAI Sa'ar, and the F-4 Phantom II.

The fifth and last Israeli Air Force F-4E Kurnass squadron, 105 was activated at Hatzor on March 31, 1975, under the command of Shmuel Gordon. The Scorpion received its mounts under Peace Echo V deliveries, flying the IAF's newest aircraft and latest blocks, and was soon the first IAF Squadron to introduce the AGM-78 Purple Fist anti-radiation missile. It flew its first operational bombing mission, against a PLO base in Lebanon, in September 1977.

The squadron flew 335 sorties during the 1982 Lebanon War, primarily in the SEAD and close air support roles, and participated in operation Mole Cricket 19. The squadron scored the war's sole F-4E kill, when Ben-Ami Peri and David Oakman shot down a Syrian Air Force MiG-21 on June 11. 105 Squadron Phantoms were distinguished by a red arrow along both sides of their fuselage, initially solid red but later white with red outlines.

The squadron was disbanded in 1987 following IAF budget cuts.

The squadron won the 2009 "Skewer" competition.
