= Operation Model 5 =

1973 battle of the Yom Kippur War

- Part of Yom Kippur War
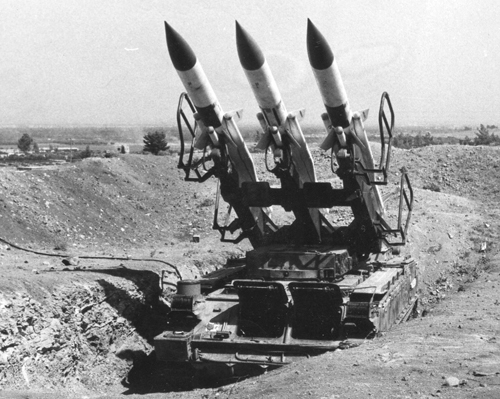
- Syrian "Kub" Air Defense System, 1973.
Date	7 October 1973
Location	Golan Heights
Result	Syrian victory

Belligerents
Israel	Syria

Commanders and leaders
Benny Peled	Unknown

Strength
Unknown aircraft	Unknown missile batteries

Casualties and losses
9 killed 15 captured 24 aircraft destroyed 24 aircraft damaged	1 missile battery SA-3 destroyed 1 missile battery SA-2 damaged

Operation Model 5 (Hebrew: דוגמן 5, Doogman 5) is the name of an Israeli Air Force operation, and the common name for the ensuing anti-aircraft battle, which took place over the Golan Heights on the October 7, 1973, the second day of the Yom Kippur War.

Model 5 was preplanned as a sweeping operation to destroy all of the Syrian surface-to-air missile (SAM) batteries on the Golan front, by using unguided, general-use bombs dropped from a medium altitude near the targets. The attacking aircraft were to approach the targets at a very low altitude, in order to avoid being detected by Syrian radars (especially fire control and target acquisition radars such as the Flat Face and Long Track).

Due to a lack of updated intelligence and reliance on outdated IMINT, while suffering from an underdeveloped ELINT–ESM capability, the Israeli aircraft did not find their targets, as these SAM batteries had already moved to other locations.

The outcome of Model 5 was catastrophic for the attacking force: six F-4 Phantom aircraft were lost over Syria and several others were damaged but returned to Ramat David. Most of the damaged aircraft were hit by ZSU-23-4 air defense artillery guns, which were especially deadly due to the sorties' very low altitude. Two crewmen were killed and nine captured by the Syrians, for the destruction of but a single Syrian SAM battery.

Stunned by their difficulties in suppressing enemy air defenses in both fronts of the Yom Kippur War and the resulting degradation in the effectiveness of the Israeli Air Force, the Israelis spent the years following the war developing a comprehensive strategy to deal with the suppression of enemy air defenses. These efforts culminated in their engagement of the Syrians 9 years later in Operation Mole Cricket 19, where they were able to, for the first time in history, destroy an entire Soviet-made SAM network in a matter of hours.

== See also ==
- Yom Kippur War
- F-4 Phantom
- A-4 Skyhawk
