= 109 Squadron (Israel) =

Israeli military unit

- טייסת העמק
- Valley Squadron emblem
- Active: July 1951 – Present
- Country: Israel
- Branch: Israeli Air Force
- Role: Air Defence
- Garrison/HQ: Ramat David Airbase
- Nickname: The Valley Squadron
- Engagements: 2026 Iran war

Aircraft flown
- Fighter: F-16D

The 109 Squadron of the Israeli Air Force, also known as The Valley Squadron, operates F-16D fighters out of Ramat David Airbase.

== History ==
The squadron began operating the De Havilland Mosquito FB Mk.VI and PR Mk XVI in July 1951.

== See also ==
- Operation Rhodes
