= Nevatim Airbase =

Israeli Air Force base

Nevatim Israeli Air Force Base Air Force Base 28
- בסיס נבטים
- Nevatim, Southern District in Israel
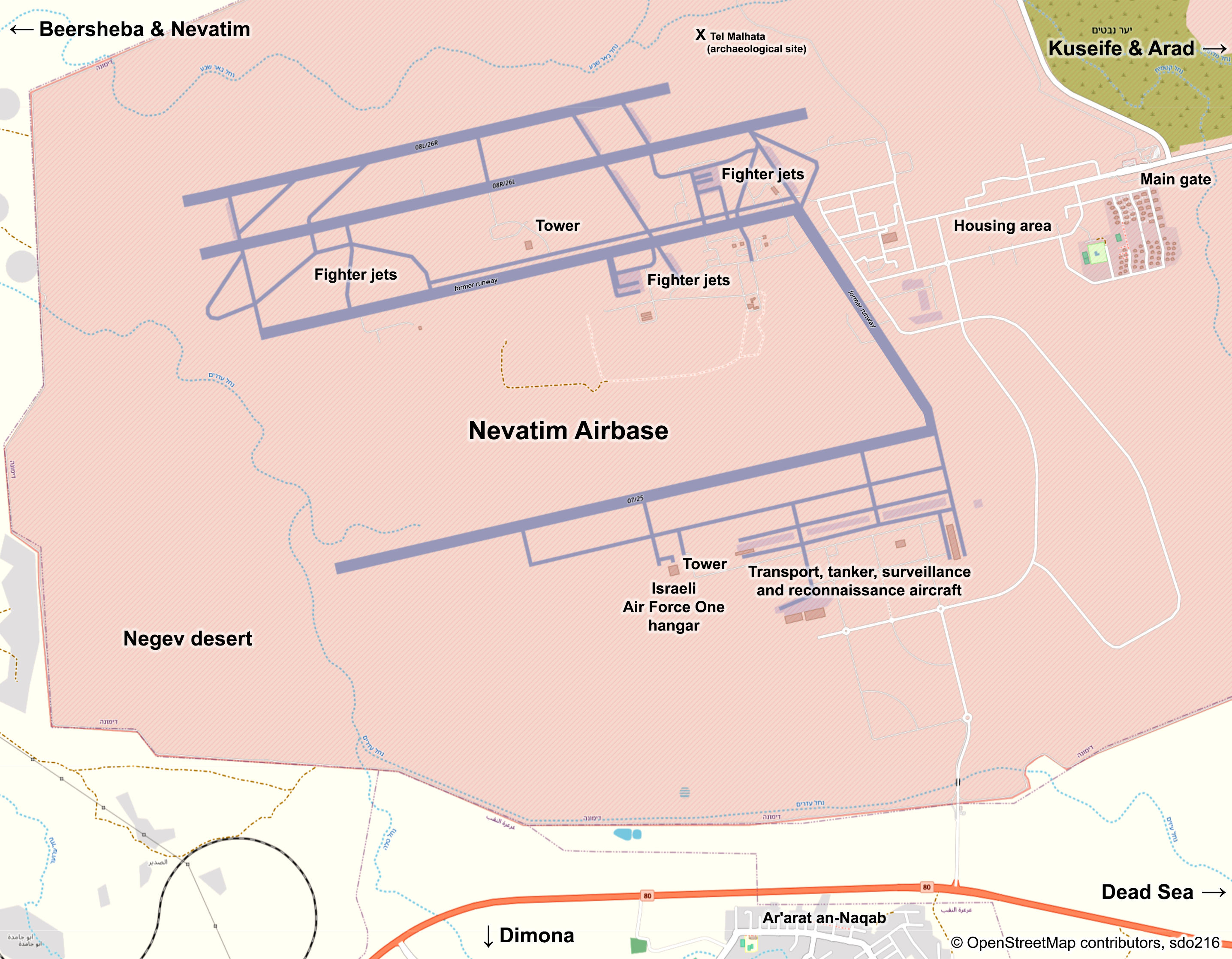

Site information
- Type: Airbase
- Owner: Israel Defense Forces
- Operator: Israeli Air Force

Location
- Shown within Israel Nevatim Airbase (Israel)
- Coordinates: 31°12′30″N 35°00′42″E

Site history
- Built: 1947 & 1983
- In use: 1947 – 1948, 1983 – present

Airfield information
- Identifiers: IATA: VTM, ICAO: LLNV
- Elevation: 424 metres (1,391 ft) AMSL
Runways
Direction	Length and surface
08L/26R	2,600 metres (8,530 ft) Asphalt
08R/26L	3,350 metres (10,991 ft) Asphalt
07/25	3,900 metres (12,795 ft) Asphalt

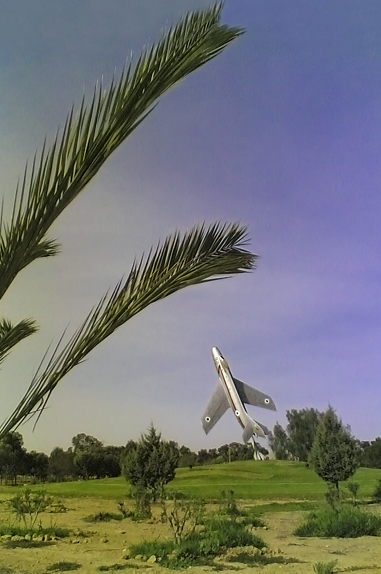
A Dassault Mystère IV A jet from bygone times, erected on display near the east entrance of Nevatim Airbase (31°12′28″N 35°03′01″E)

Nevatim Airbase (Hebrew: בסיס נבטים, English: sprouts) (IATA: VTM, ICAO: LLNV), also Air Force Base 28, is an Israeli Air Force (IAF) base, located 15 km east-southeast of Beersheba, near moshav Nevatim in the northern Negev desert. It is one of the largest in Israel and has three runways of different lengths. Stealth fighter jets, transport aircraft, tanker aircraft and machines for electronic reconnaissance/surveillance, as well as the Wing of Zion, are stationed there (see: Units).

The airbase was long considered for dual use – military and civilian – as an airport for the growing city of Beersheba. But in February 2026, the Israeli government decided to build a new major airport on the opposite side of the city, about 40 km from the base (see: International Airport).

== History ==
=== The beginning ===
- As early as 1947, a rough runway was built here in the northern Negev Desert for the Sherut Avir, the air wing of the Haganah. The former airfield was named Malhata after the archaeological site, the mound or tell known as Tel Malḥata (see photo in the gallery below) northeast of today's northern runway within the airbase (see map on the right and location: 31°13′02″N 35°01′33″E).
- In 1958, the site was earmarked for the construction of a future international airport for the city of Beersheba and its surroundings, which would replace the local airport located to the northwest, which was not suitable for development as a modern major airport.
- In 1966, an inter-ministerial committee was set up to study the possibility of building an International Airport in the Beersheba region, but in practice this issue was not further promoted.
- The today's modern airbase was built from 1980 and opened in October 1983 with initially two runways as the result of joint Israeli and US government funding as part of the IAF's redeployment out of its bases in the Sinai after the peninsula was returned to Egypt following the Camp David Accords (see photo of Anwar Sadat, Jimmy Carter and Menachem Begin in gallery below). From 1979 to 1982 Ramon Airbase and Ovda Airbase were also built in the Negev – mainly by US companies.
- For the construction of the Nevatim Airbase in the early 1980s, some Israeli Bedouins had to be relocated outside the planned area. They were financially compensated for this, and efforts are still being made to maintain a good relationship with them.
- In 1986, it was proposed to use the base also for tourist charter flights from Europe to the Dead Sea.
- In 1990, a committee again recommended the construction of an International Airport at the location of the base.
- In the wake of budget cuts in the mid-1990s, there were considerations of closing the base entirely and relocating its air units to other airbases. Instead, it expanded starting in the early 2000s, and in 2008 it finally took over the military portion of Ben Gurion Airport, known as Lod Airbase (see: transport, refueling, and reconnaissance aircraft).

==== Gallery ====
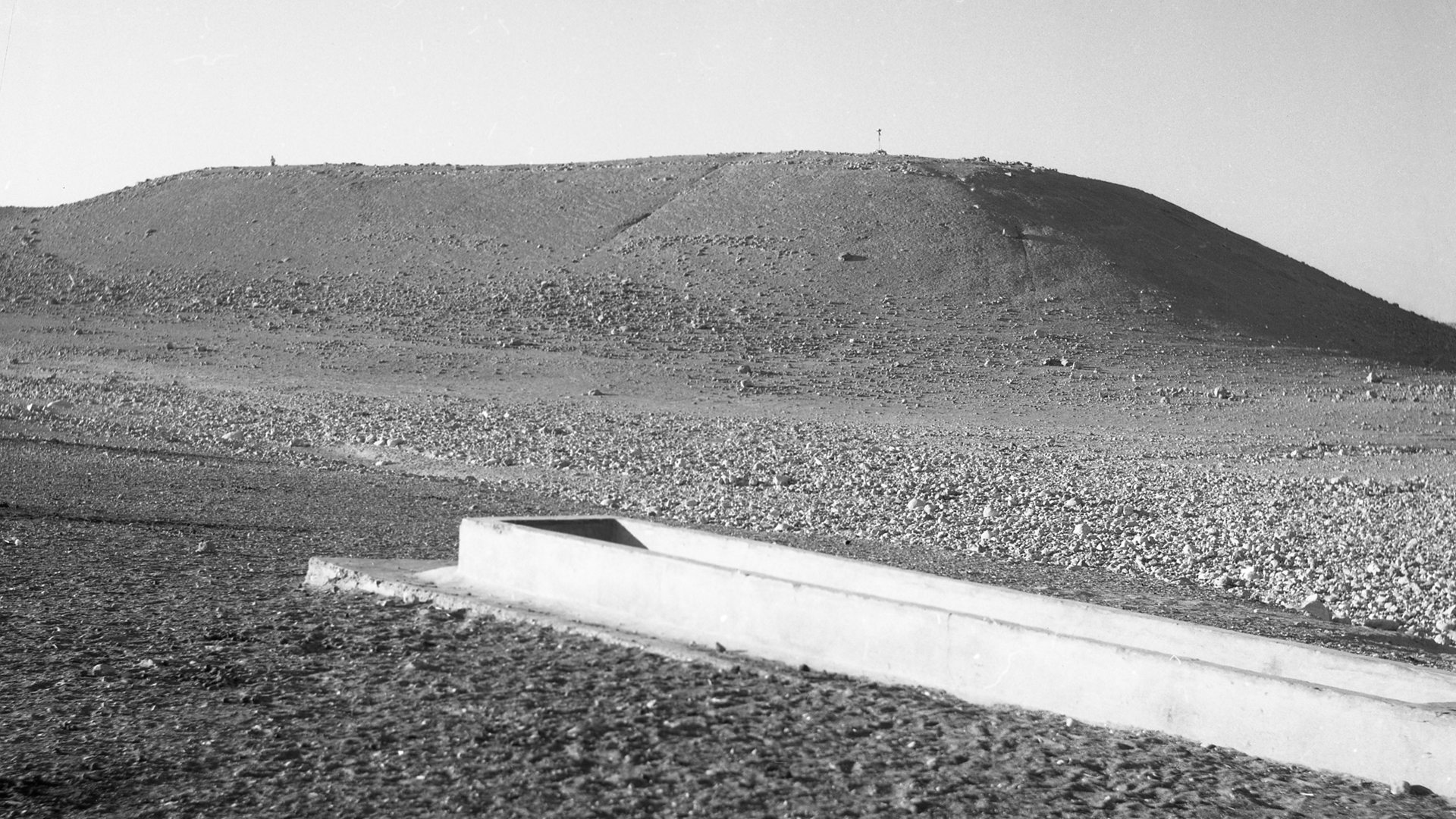
The archaeological site of Tel Malḥata in the 1950s, northeast of today's northern runway of Nevatim Airbase, animal drinking trough in the front

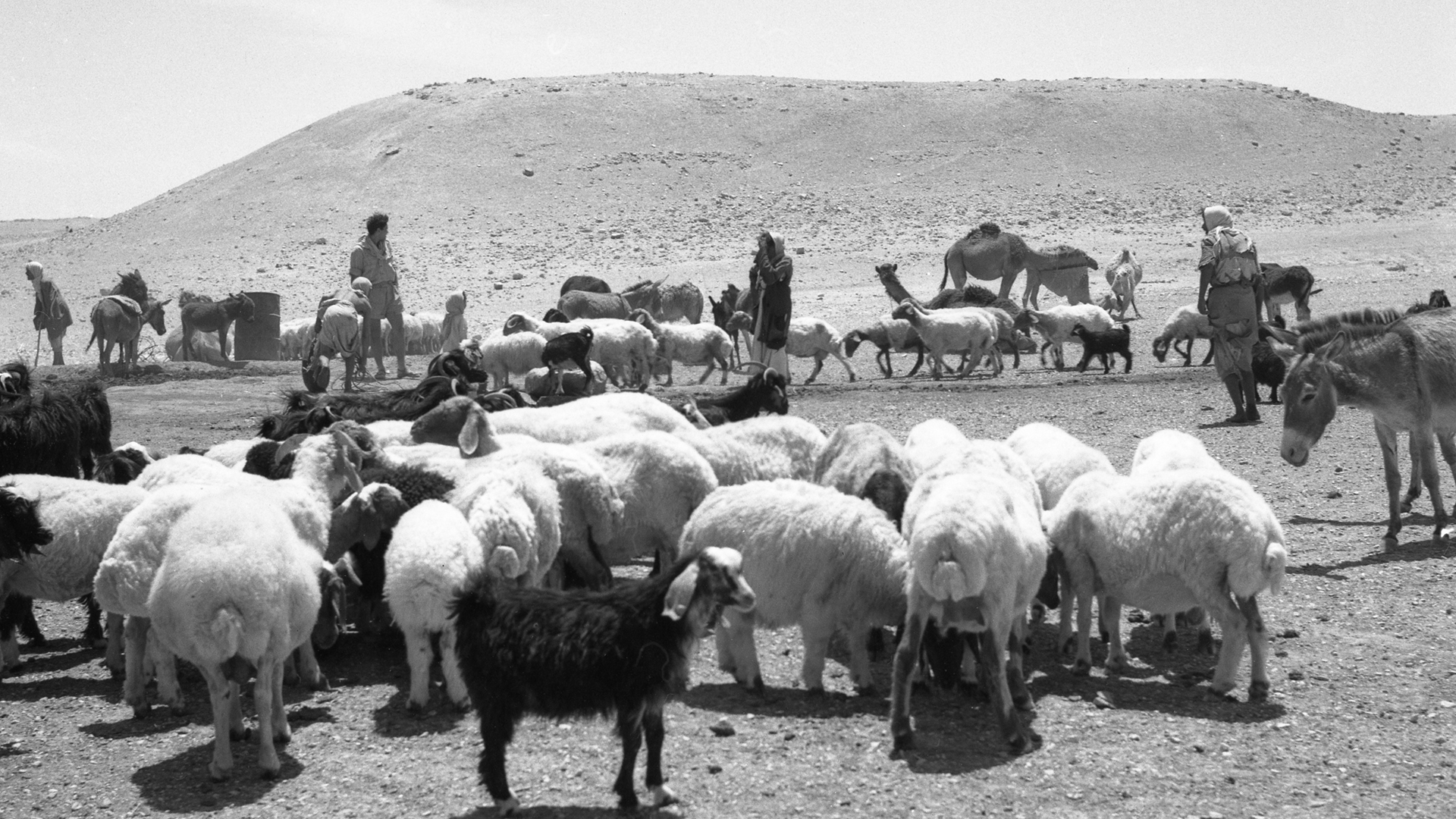
Israeli Bedouin with their herds at Tel Malḥata in 1955, where the Nevatim Airbase is now located
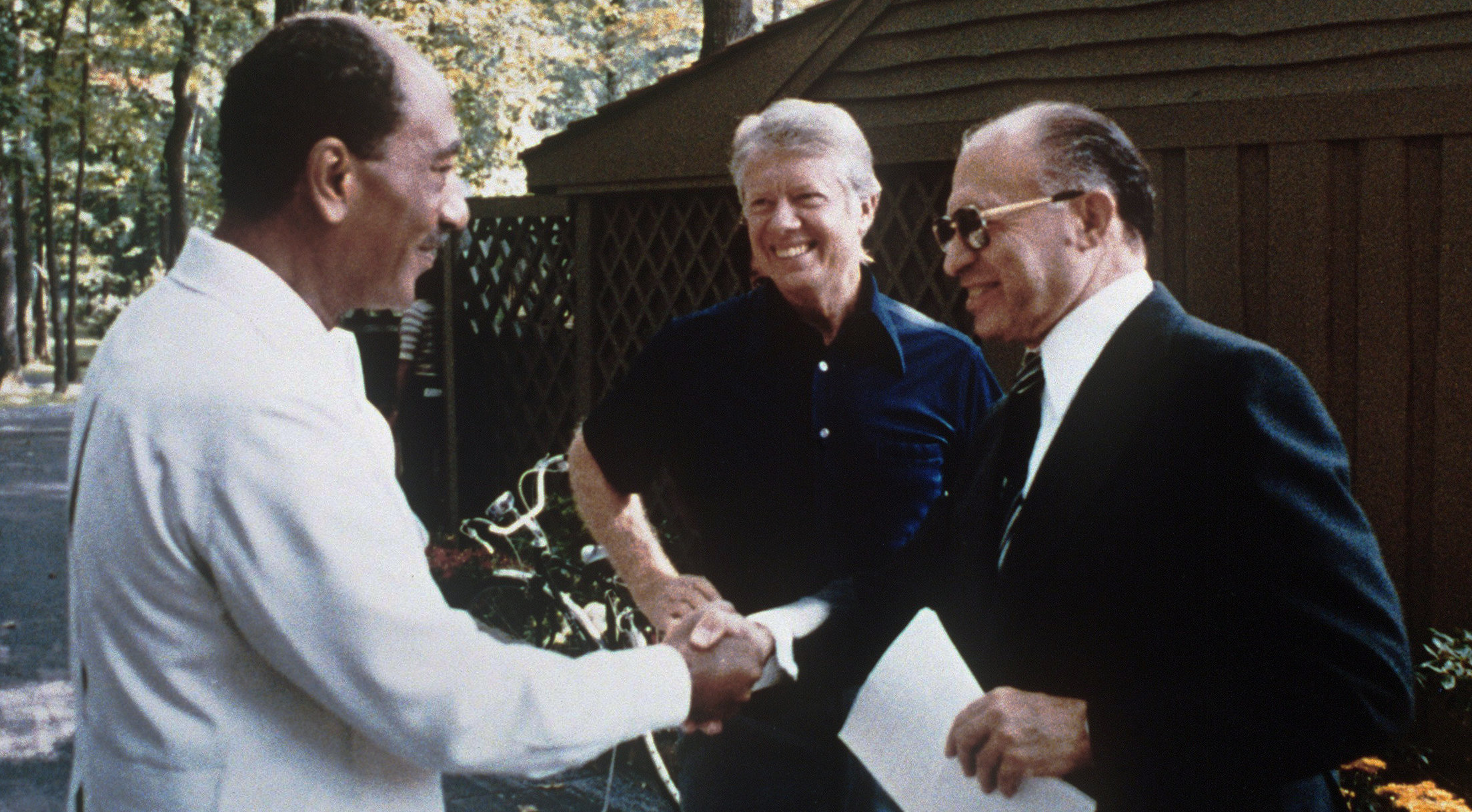
The then presidents Anwar Sadat, Jimmy Carter and Prime Minister Menachem Begin (left to right) at Camp David (USA) in September 1978

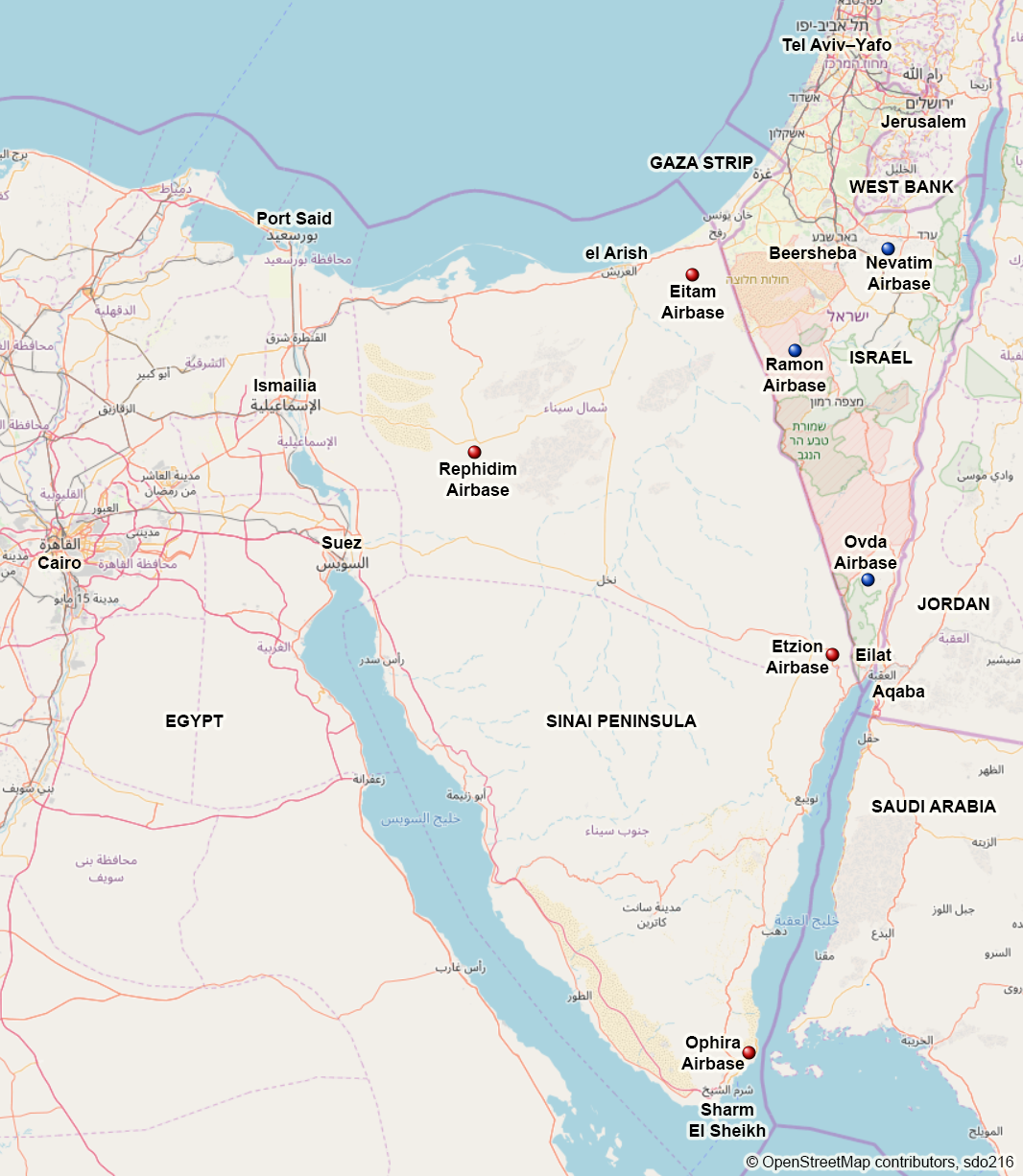
Abandoned IAF bases on the Sinai Peninsula (red) and newly established bases in southern Israel (blue) following the Camp David Accords

=== Fighter jet squadrons ===
Three squadrons of fighter jets are stationed at Nevatim. Here is their history in brief:

==== 116 Squadron "Lions/ Defenders Of The South" ====
The 116 Squadron "Lions Of The South" with A-4N Skyhawk Ayit light fighter jets was relocated in 1983 from Tel Nof Airbase to the newly established Nevatim Airbase 70 km further south and was its first fighter jet squadron. The A-4N jets remained in service there until 2002, when the squadron was temporarily disbanded.

In 2003 it was reopened with F-16A/B Netz jets as the "Defenders Of The South", which had been transferred here from the 253 Squadron "Negev" at Ramon Airbase. Three squadrons at Ramon received new F-16I Sufa jets during that time, adapted to Israeli needs. In the summer of 2015, all F-16 jets at Nevatim were decommissioned and the squadron was disbanded again.

Back in the 1960s, the 116 Squadron at Tel Nof Airbase flew the French-made Dassault Mystère IV A. As a reminiscence of this, a Mystère IV jet from that era was placed on a grassy hill near the east gate of Nevatim Airbase, with its nose pointing steeply into the sky (see photo right above). A number of other aircraft from bygone times are also on display in a park there (31°12′30″N 35°03′10″E).

In November 2019, the 116 Squadron "Lions Of The South" was reopened at Nevatim Airbase with new F-35I Adir stealth jets from the US. It is expected to reach its full size with 25 aircraft towards the end of the 2020s, like the other two F-35I squadrons at Nevatim.

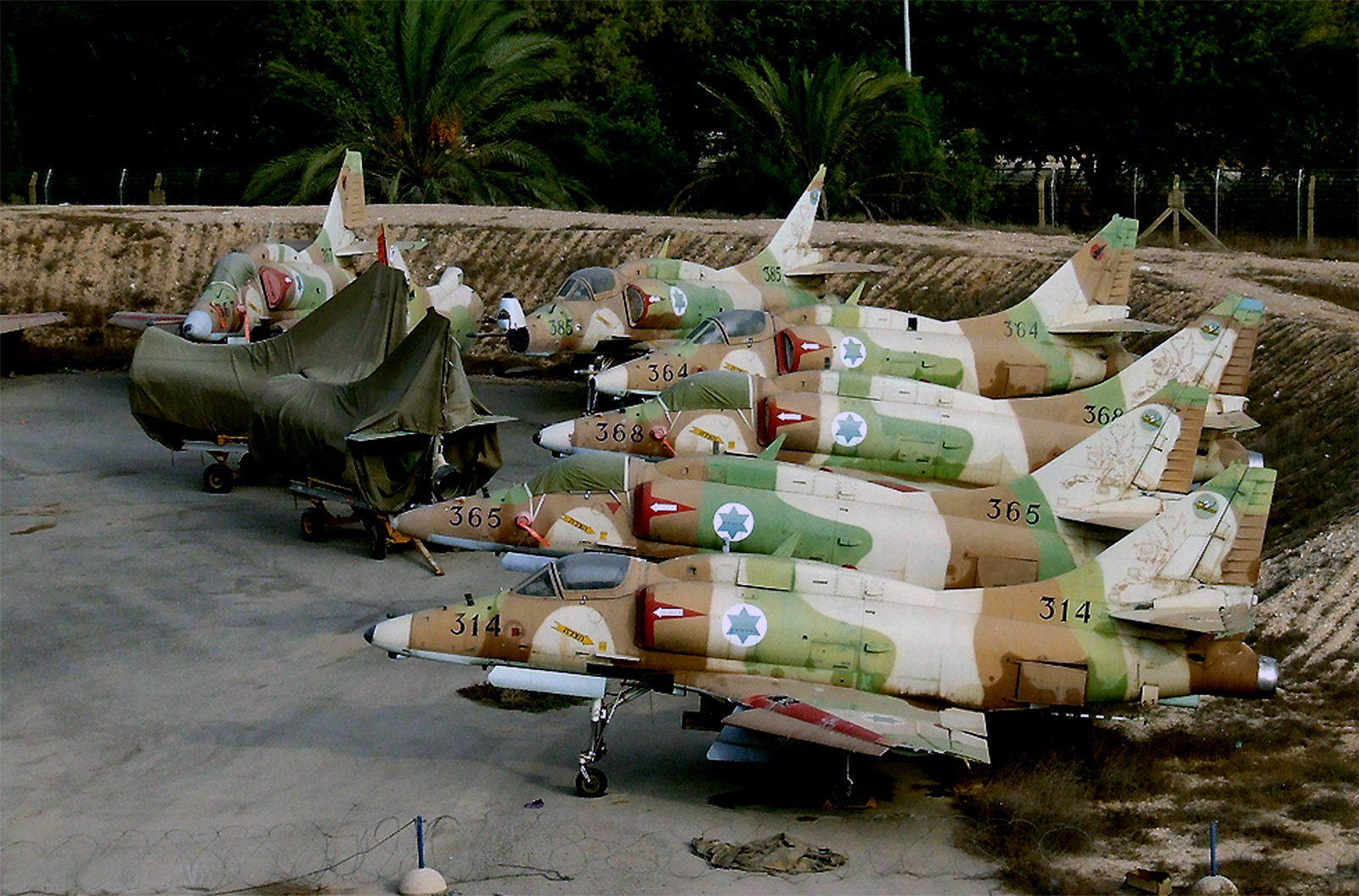
Decommissioned A-4N Skyhawk Ayit jets, also from the 116 Squadron "Lions Of The South" (red and black symbol on the tail), around 2009

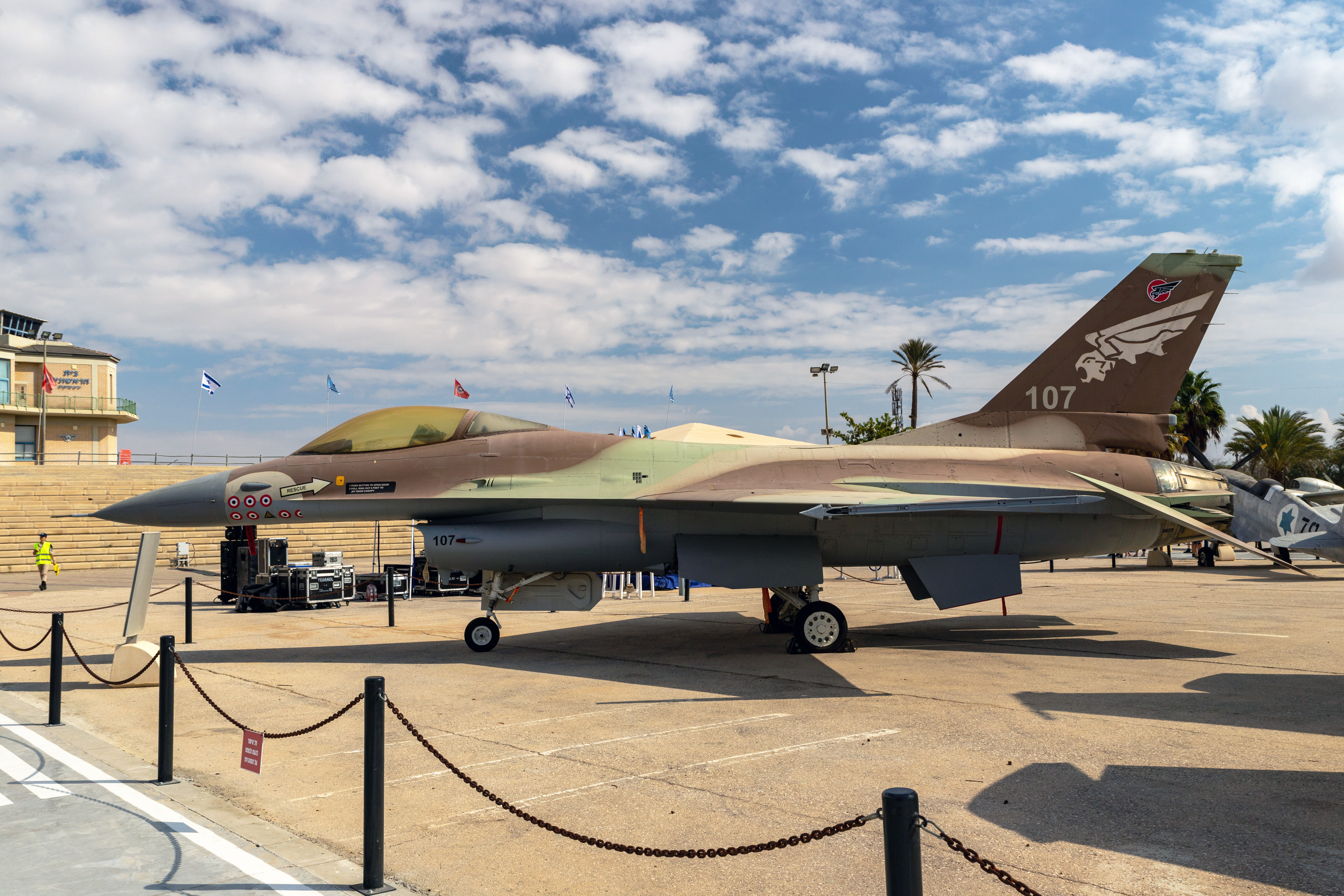
F-16A Netz #107 of 116 Squadron "Defenders Of The South" with 6.5 kill markings and a symbol of Operation Opera at the IAF Museum in 2022

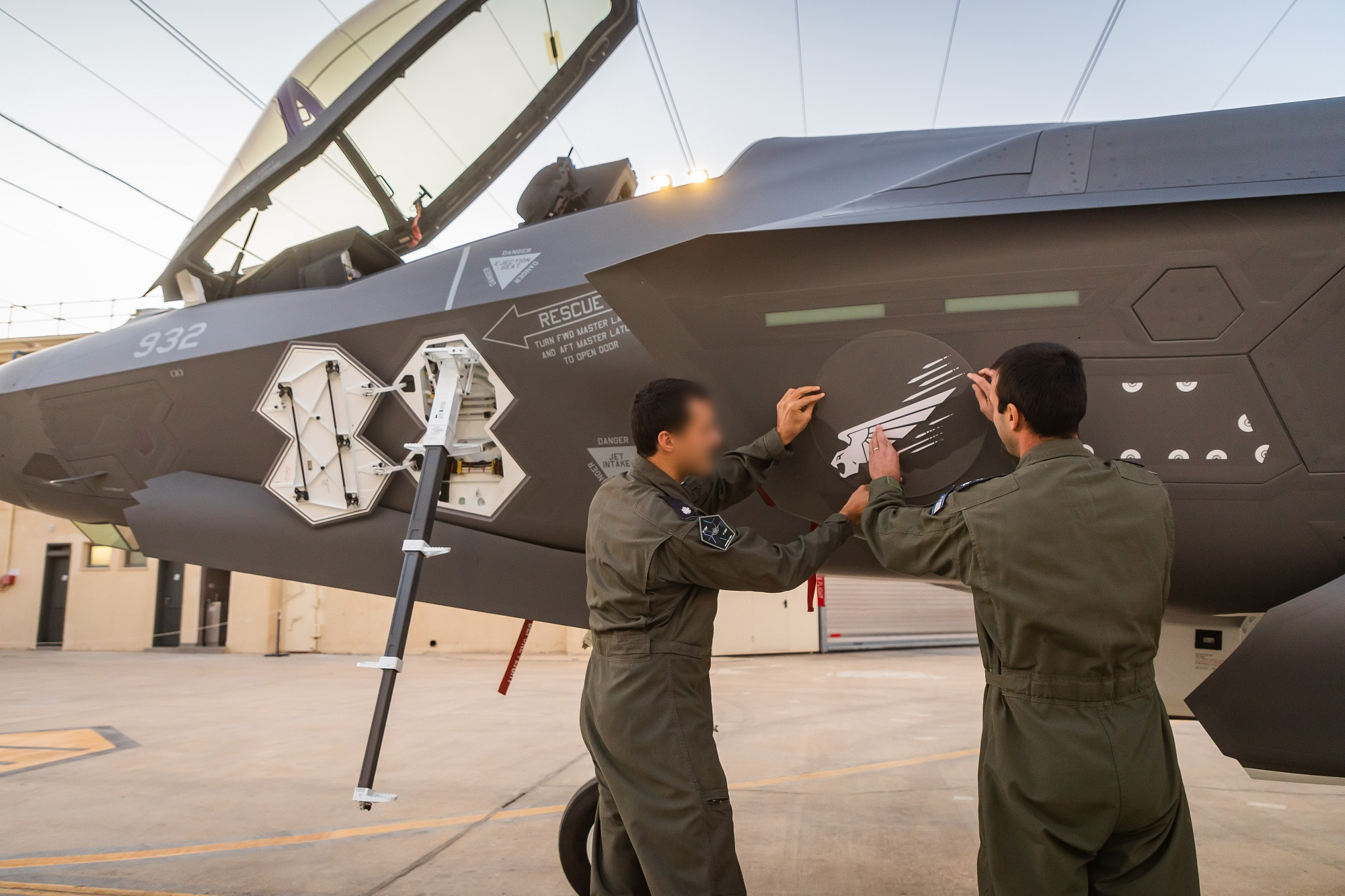
Reopening of 116 Squadron "Lions Of The South" with F-35I Adir stealth jets at Nevatim Airbase in November 2019

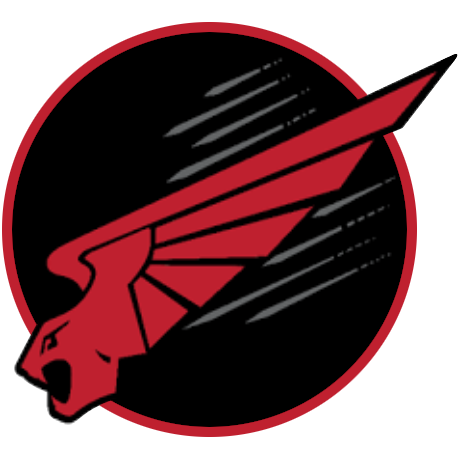
Current emblem of 116 Squadron "Lions Of The South"

==== 117 Squadron "First Jet" ====
The 117 Squadron "First Jet" was established in 1953 at Ramat David Airbase as the first fighter jet squadron of the Israeli Air Force and has participated in all of Israel's wars and combat operations since then. It operated the British-made Gloster Meteor F.8, the French Dassault Mirage IIICJ and the US-made General Dynamics F-16A..D from Ramat David. In 2020 the squadron was temporarily disbanded.

On 1 July 2021, the 117 Squadron was reopened at Nevatim with F-35I Adir stealth jets. It will initially serve as a training squadron for the other two F-35I squadrons until sufficient F-35s have been delivered from the US, and will then become an active operational squadron. This is expected to happen in the second half of the 2020s.

From its very inception, the 117 Squadron "First Jet" was considered an elite squadron of the IAF – a status reflected in its name. Throughout its history, the squadron has been equipped with the most advanced and potent combat aircraft of the era; from 1961 onwards, for example, it operated the Mirage IIICJ, an aircraft that holds the record for the highest number of aerial victories within the IAF. In 1980, the squadron transitioned to the then-new F-16A; a year later, four of these aircraft took part in the destruction of the Iraqi Osirak nuclear reactor during Operation Opera.

Pilots from the 117 Squadron achieved the world’s first aerial victory using an F-16 (in 1981, against a Syrian Mi-8 helicopter), as well as the world’s first shoot-down of a MiG-23 by an F-16 (in 1982). In 1986, it became the first squadron in Israel to receive the upgraded F-16C/D variants. This elite status is also reflected today in the squadron’s equipment: it operates the F-35I "Adir," with its specific aircraft belonging to a more recent "Technology Refresh" (TR) or production block compared to those of the other two F-35I squadrons.

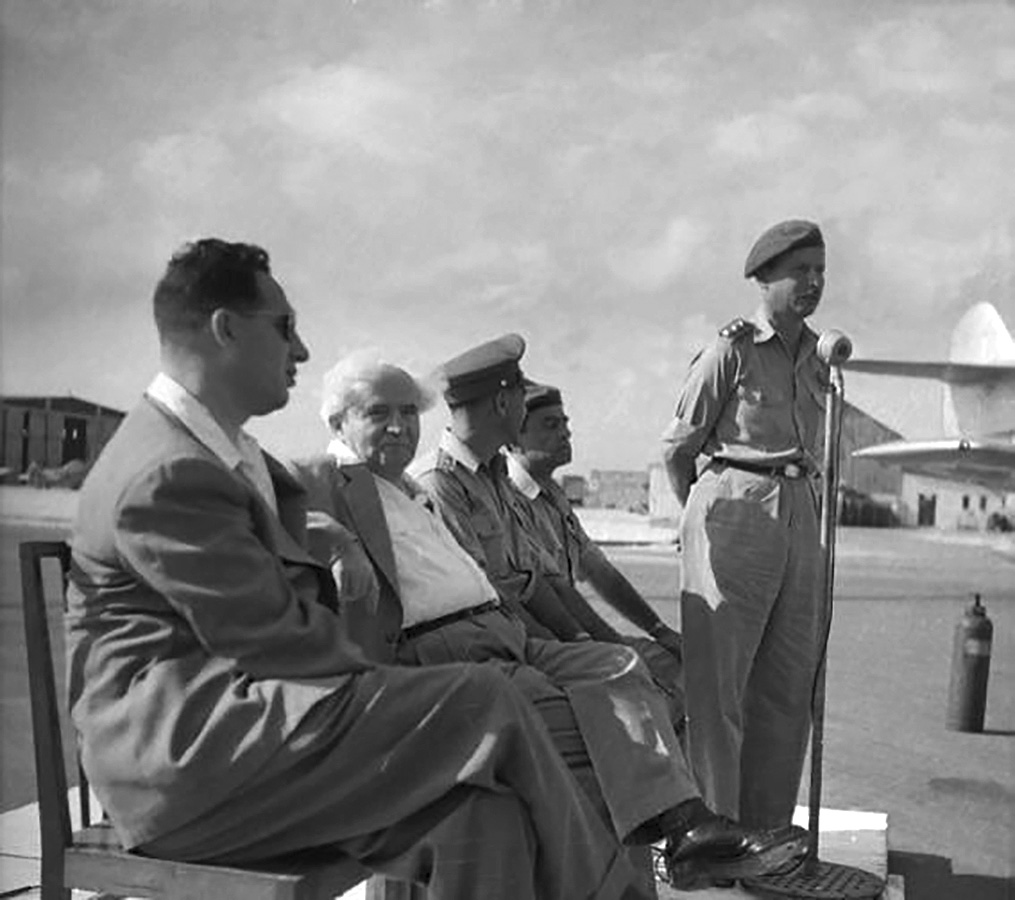
Opening ceremony of the new 117 Squadron "First Jet" on 17 June 1953 at Ramat David Airbase

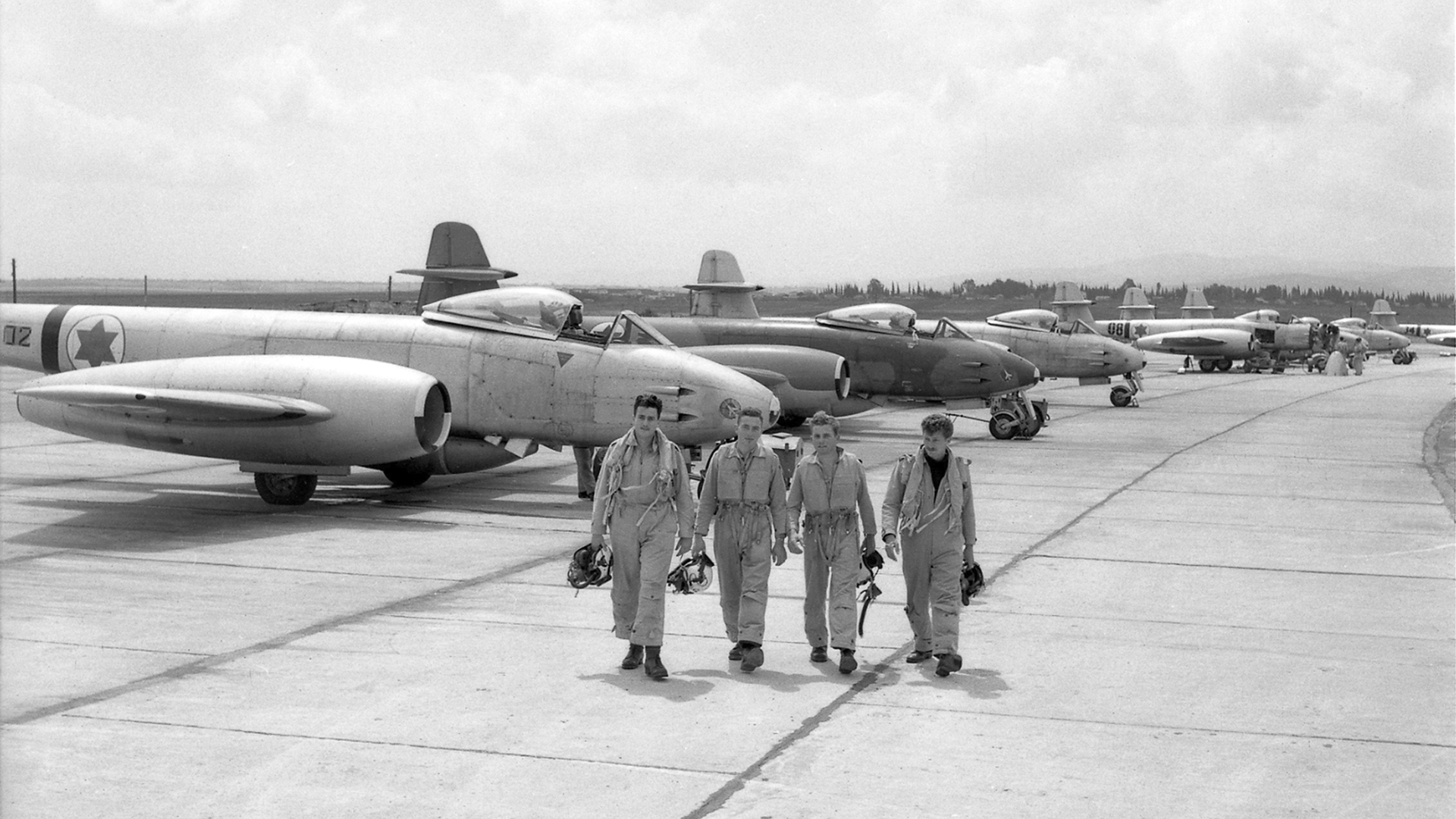
Israeli fighter pilots in front of their Gloster Meteor F.8 jets of 117 Squadron at Ramat David around 1954

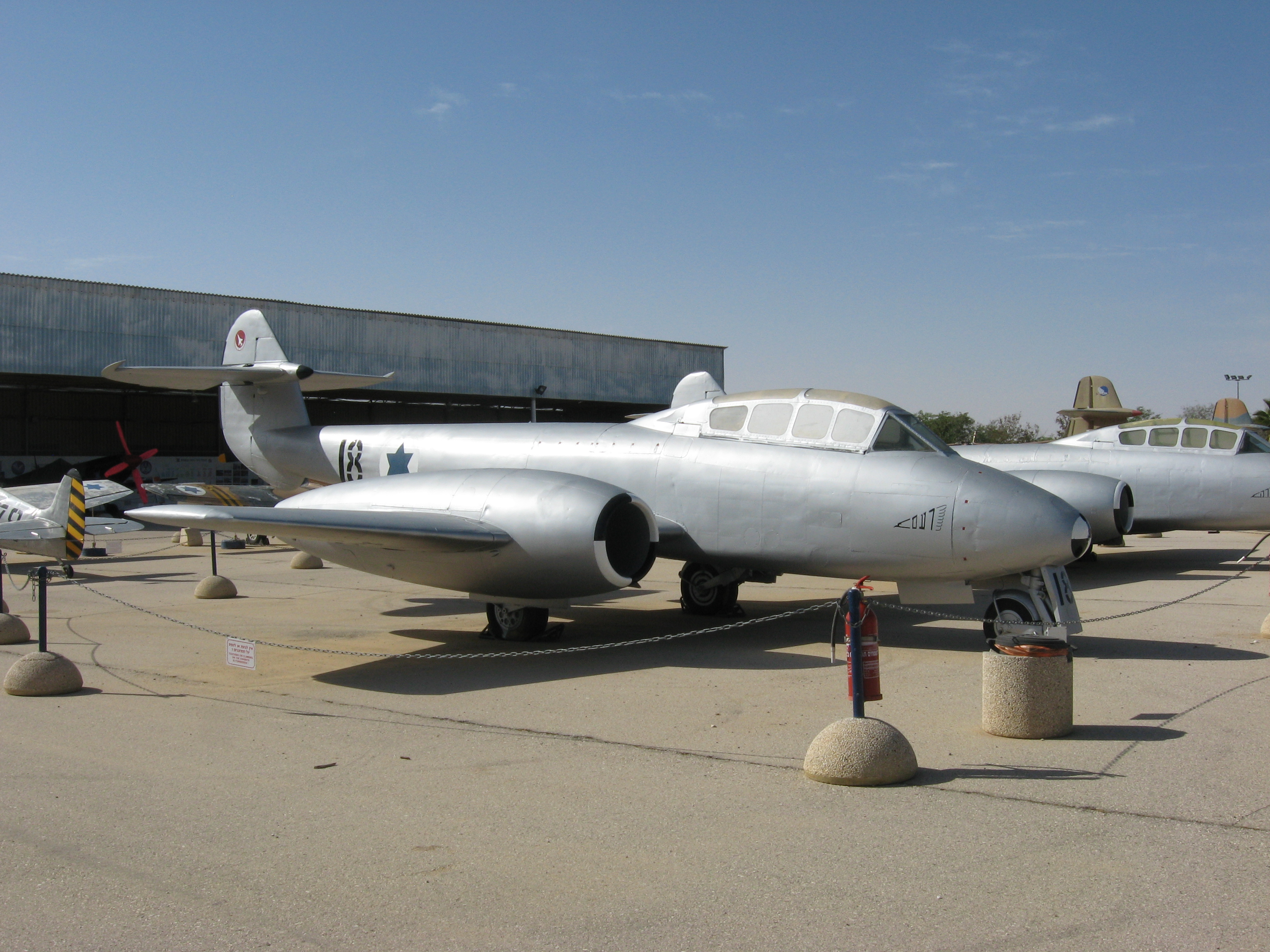
Two two-seater Gloster Meteor T.7 jet trainer for 117 Squadron "First Jet" of the IAF Flight Academy in the 1950s

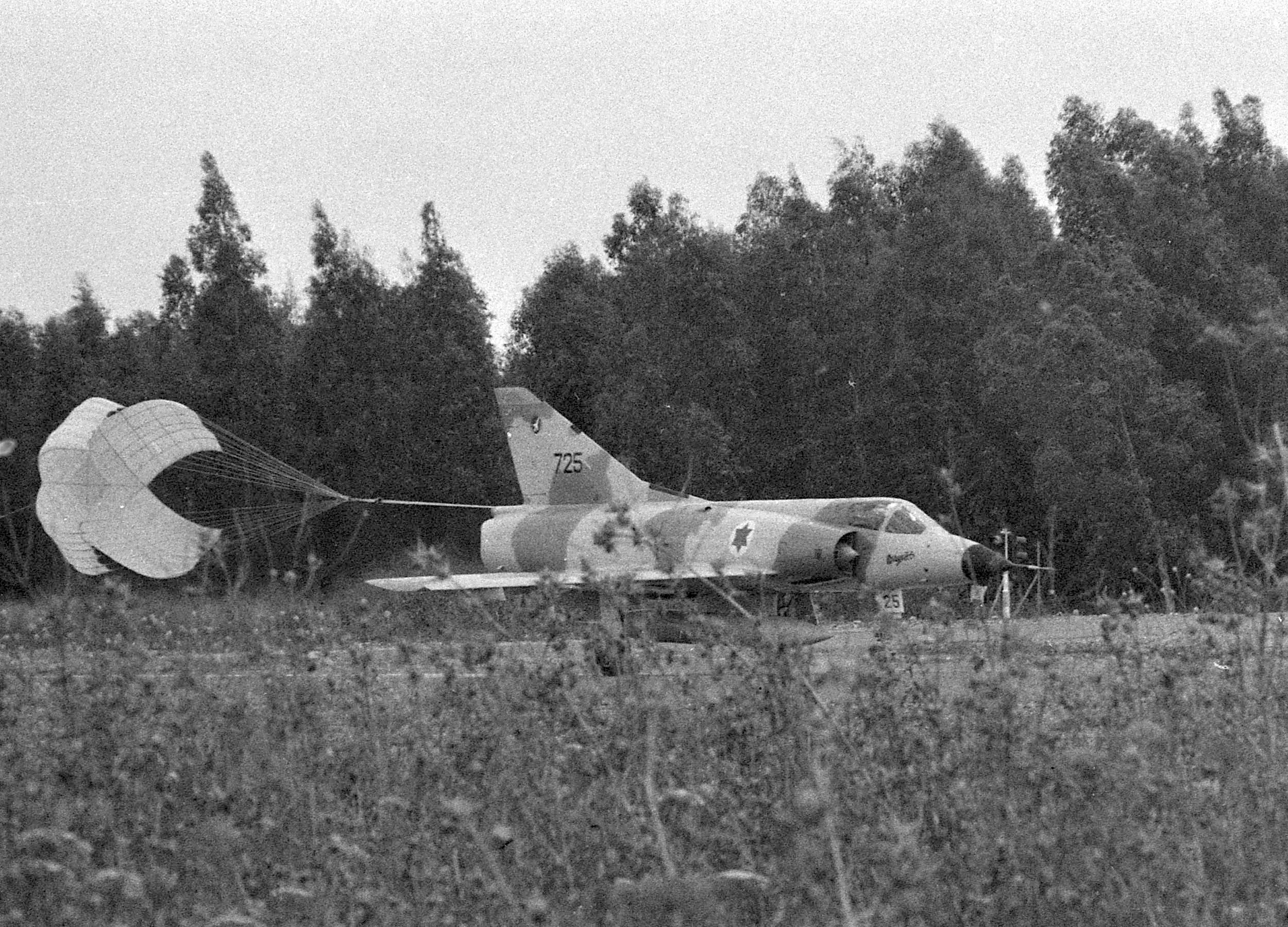
A Dassault Mirage IIICJ Shahak of 117 Squadron "First Jet" is landing at Ramat David Airbase in 1970

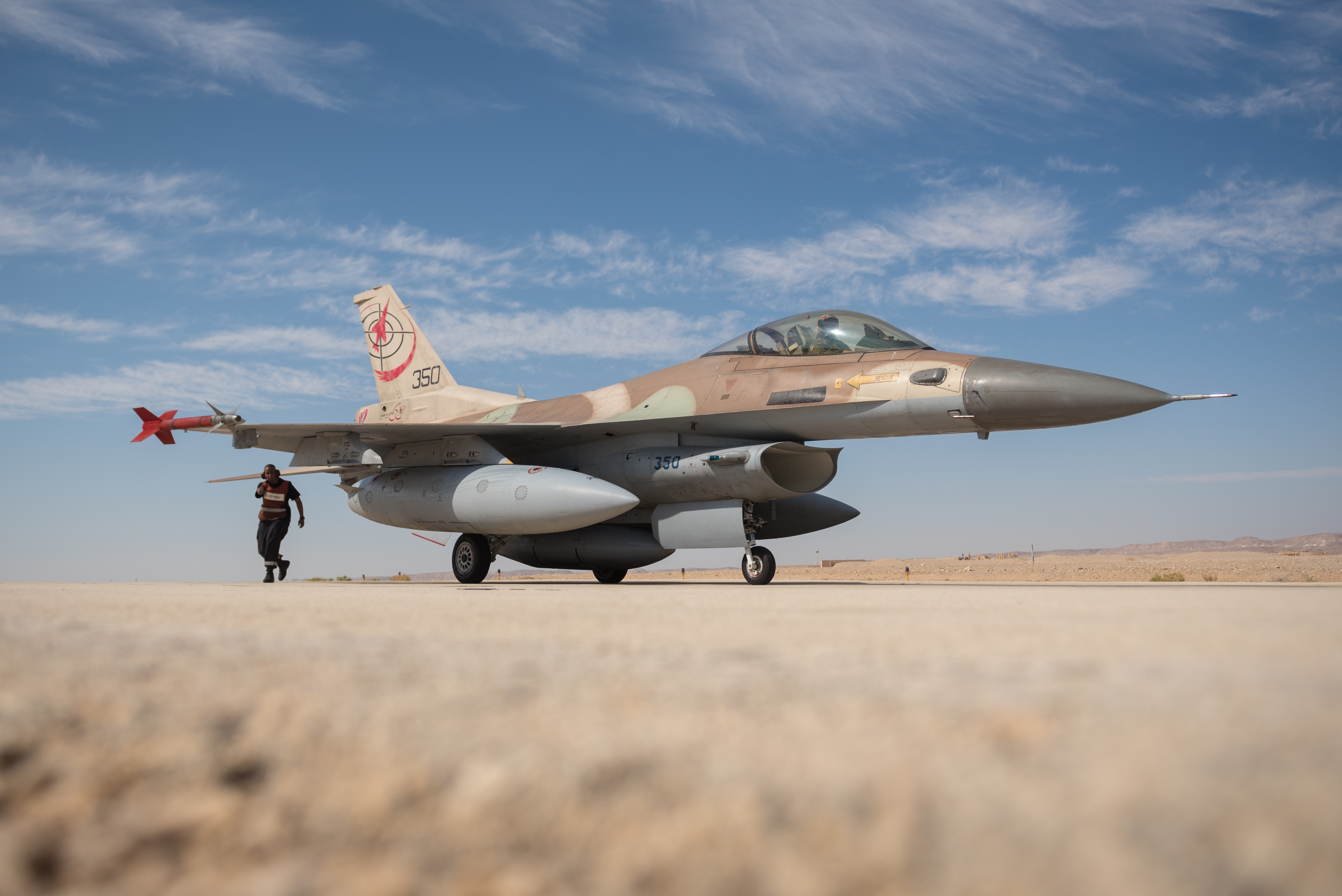
An F-16C Barak from the 117 Squadron "First Jet" at Blue Flag in 2017, disbanded at Ramat David in 2020

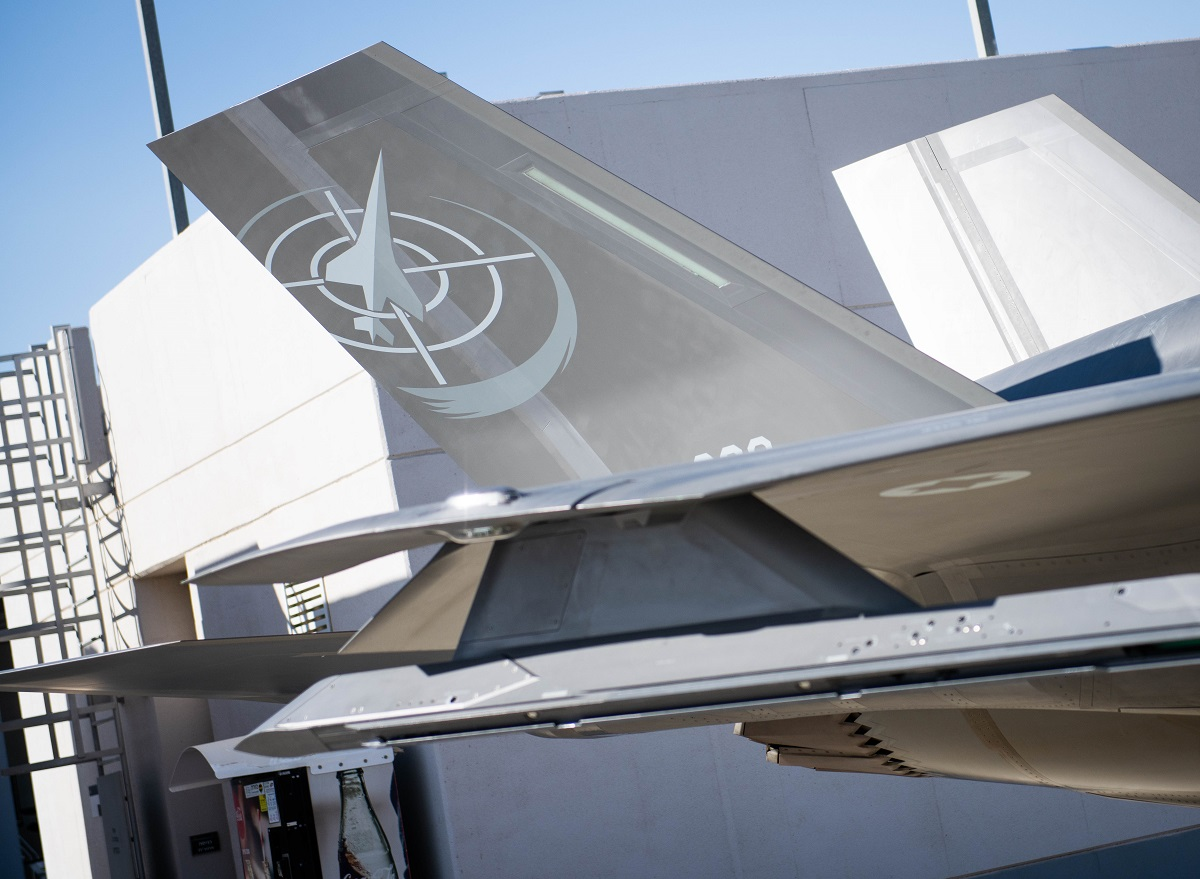
The reopening of the 117 Squadron on 1 July 2021 at Nevatim Airbase with new F-35I Adir stealth jets

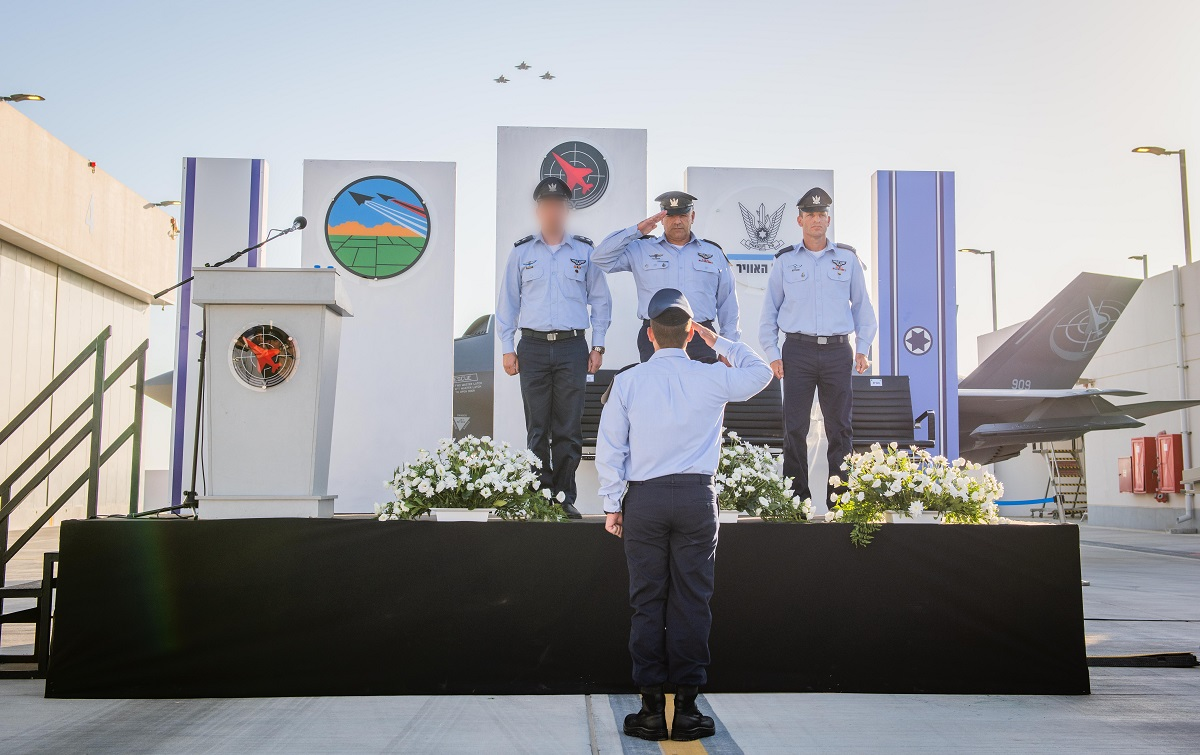
The reopening ceremony of the 117 Squadron "First Jet" on 1 July 2021 at Nevatim Airbase

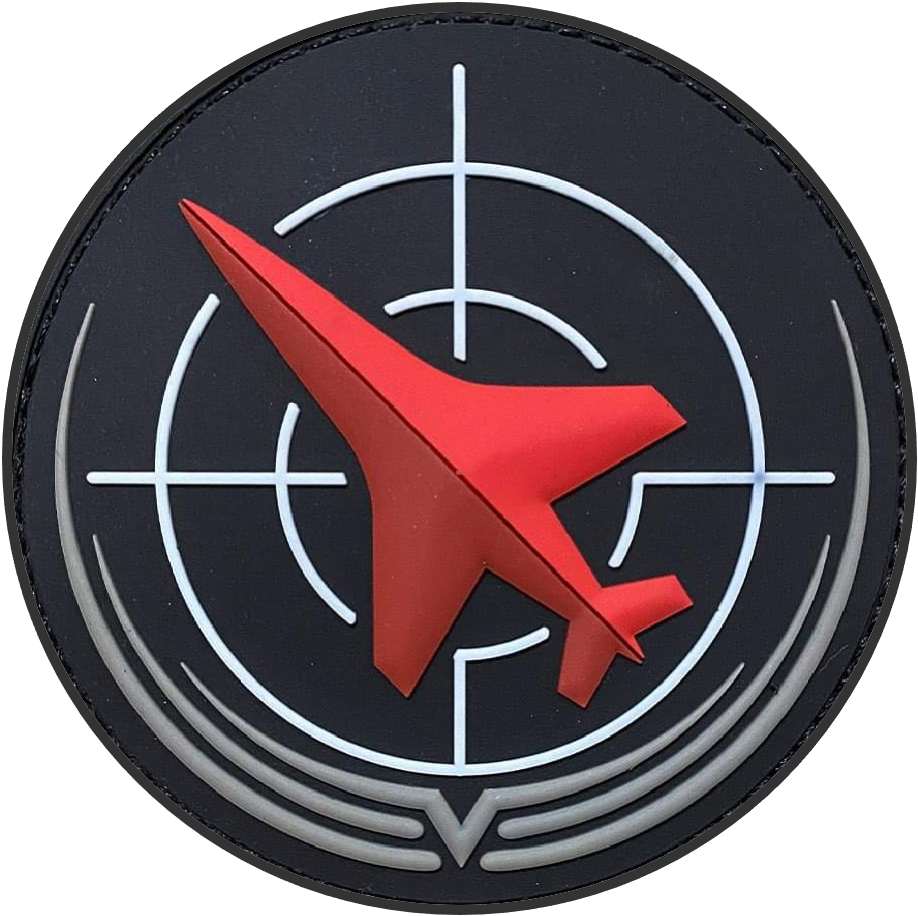
Current emblem of 117 Squadron "First Jet"

==== 140 Squadron "Golden Eagle" ====
The 140 Squadron "Golden Eagle", which operated from 1973 with A-4H/N Skyhawk Ayit, was relocated in 1982 from the abandoned Etzion Airbase in the Sinai to the newly established Ramon Airbase in the Negev and continued as a fighter and training squadron until it was finally closed down in 1985. One year later, in 1986, it was reopened at Nevatim with F-16A/B Netz fighter jets, which were pulled together from other bases here. It was not until 2013 that this squadron was closed again and its remaining F-16A/B jets were handed over to the 116 Squadron "Defenders Of The South" – also at Nevatim.

The F-16A jet #243 (see photo in the gallery below) was involved in Operation Opera on 7 June 1981, the destruction of the Iraqi nuclear reactor Osirak. It was flown by Ilan Ramon (1954–2003) and took off from Etzion Airbase for the operation, and it received a corresponding triangular symbol afterwards. At that time, this F-16A belonged to 110 Squadron "Knights Of The North" at Ramat David Airbase, later to 140 Squadron "Golden Eagle" at Nevatim, as can be seen in the photo below.

After being closed for more than three years, the 140 Squadron "Golden Eagle" was reopened at Nevatim in December 2016 and was the first squadron in Israel (and outside the USA) to receive the new stealth fighter jet F-35I with the Hebrew designation Adir (אדיר, "The Mighty One").

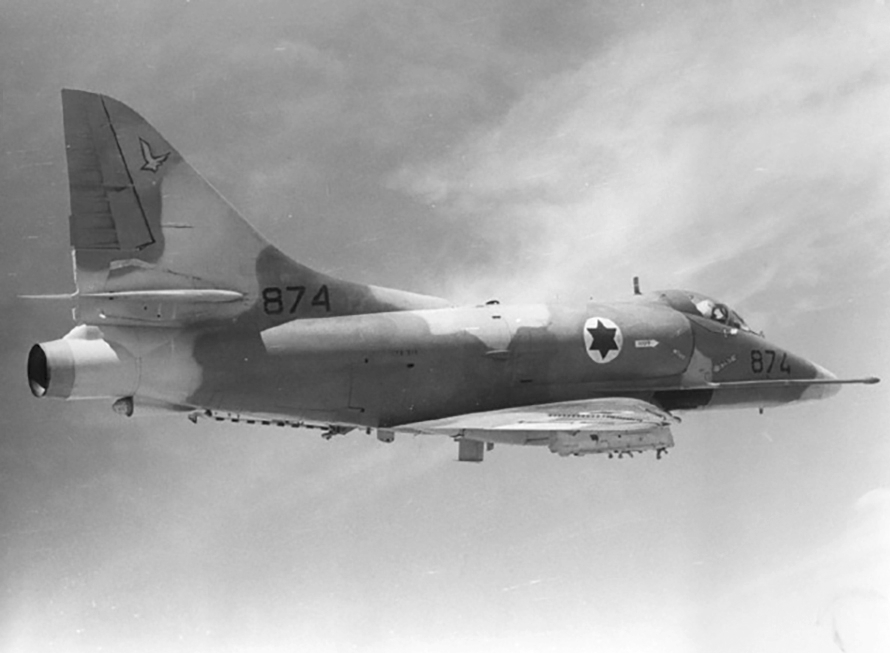
An A-4H/N Skyhawk Ayit of the 140 Squadron "Golden Eagle" of Etzion Airbase around 1973

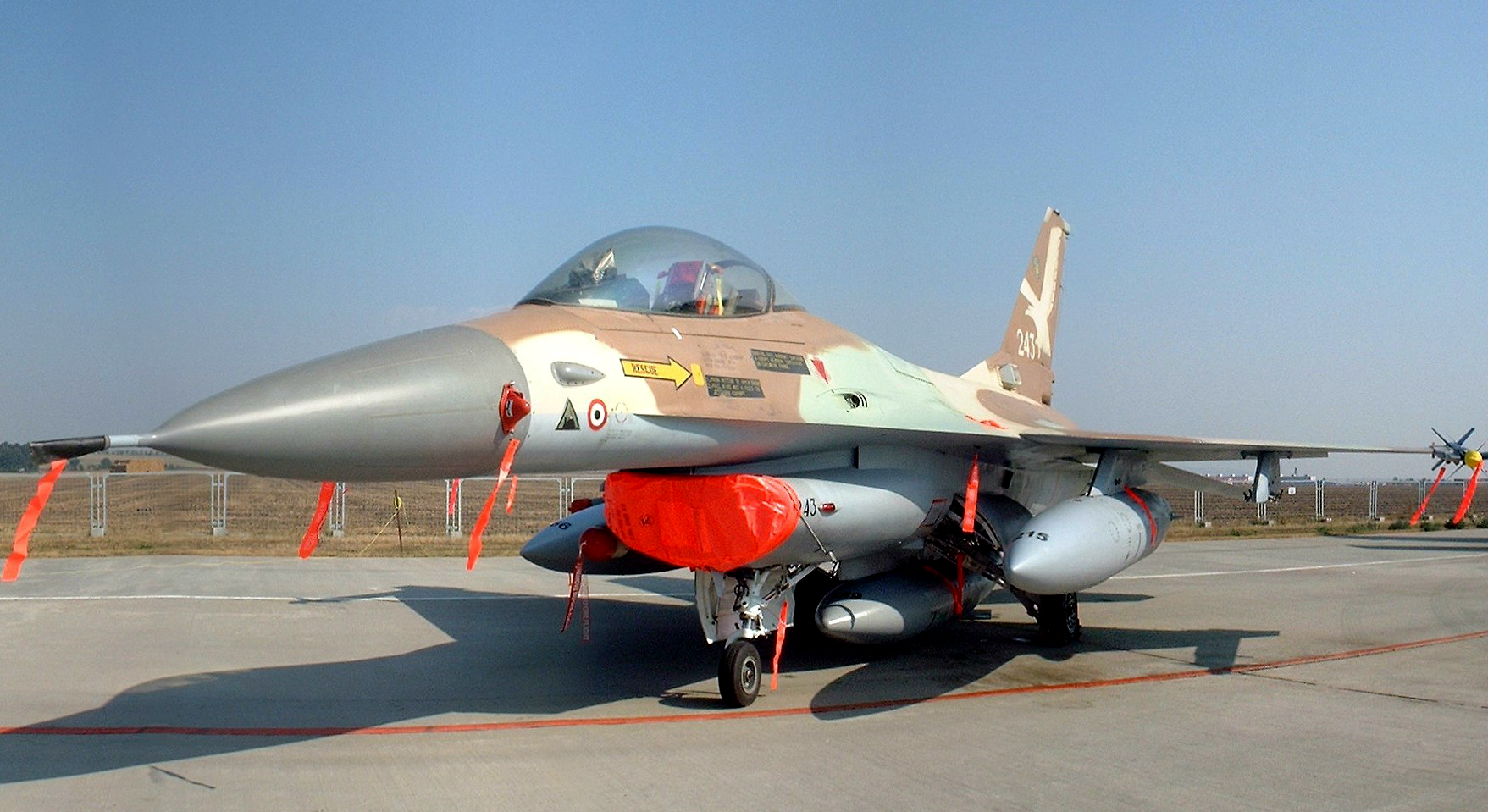
The F-16A Netz #243 of Ilan Ramon, involved in Operation Opera, exhibited in Czechia in 2004

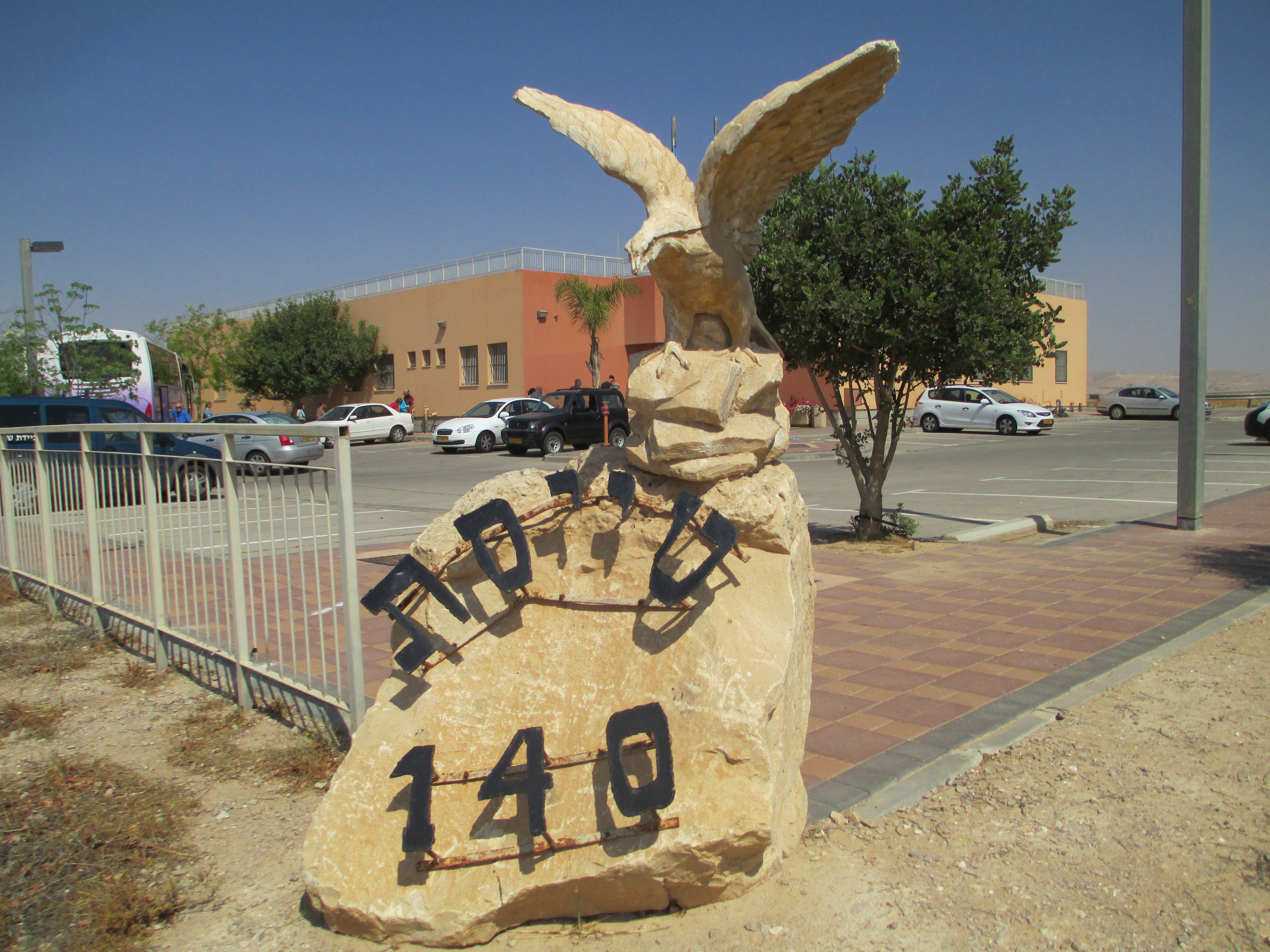
A sculpture of 140 Squadron "Golden Eagle" (טייסת 140) near a parking lot at Nevatim Airbase

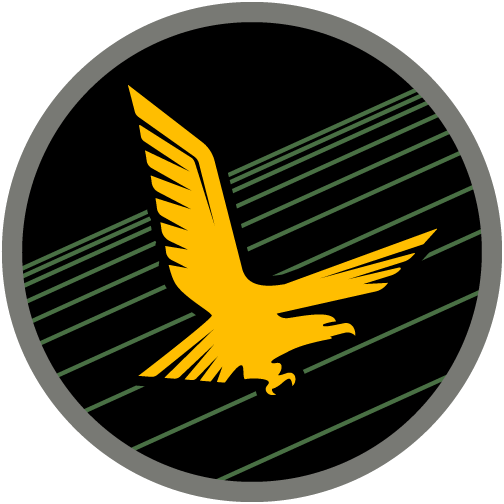
Current emblem of 140 Squadron "Golden Eagle"

== Today ==
=== Infrastructure ===
The northern part of Nevatim Airbase, with its two runways, is home to the three squadrons of F-35I stealth fighter jets. Two other runways there dating back to the early days of the base are no longer in operation (see map). The southern runway, with its 3,900 meters, was completed in 2008 and was, at the time, the longest runway in the Middle East. The southern area is primarily home to transport aircraft, tanker aircraft, and reconnaissance and surveillance aircraft.

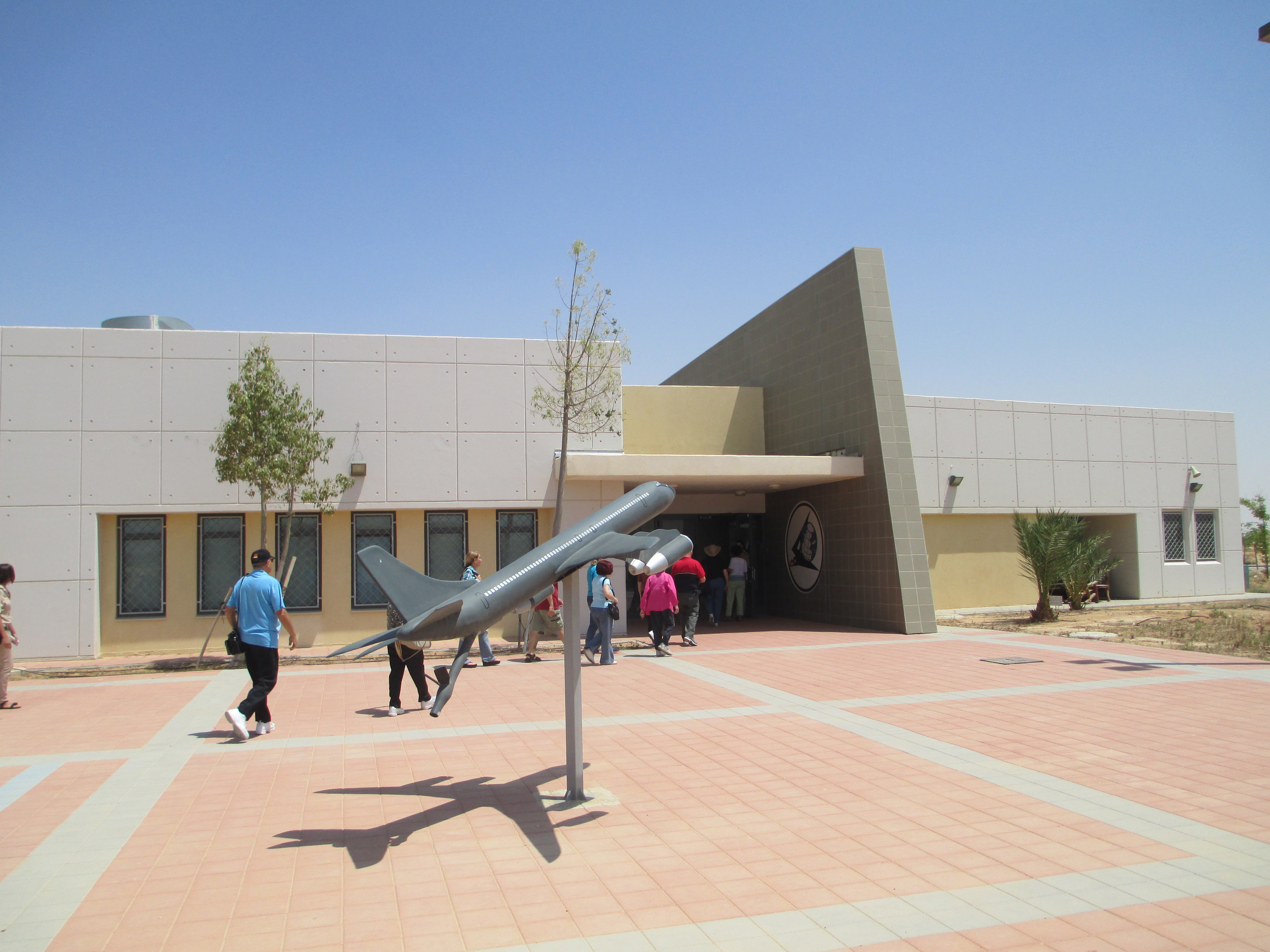
A 2010 erected building for the 120 Squadron "Desert Giants", operating Boeing 707 tankers

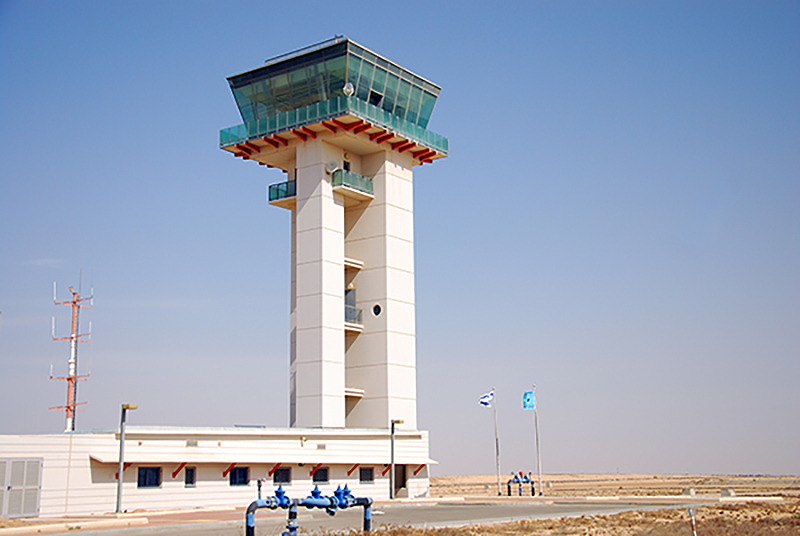
ATC tower at Nevatim Airbase near the southern runway in 2013

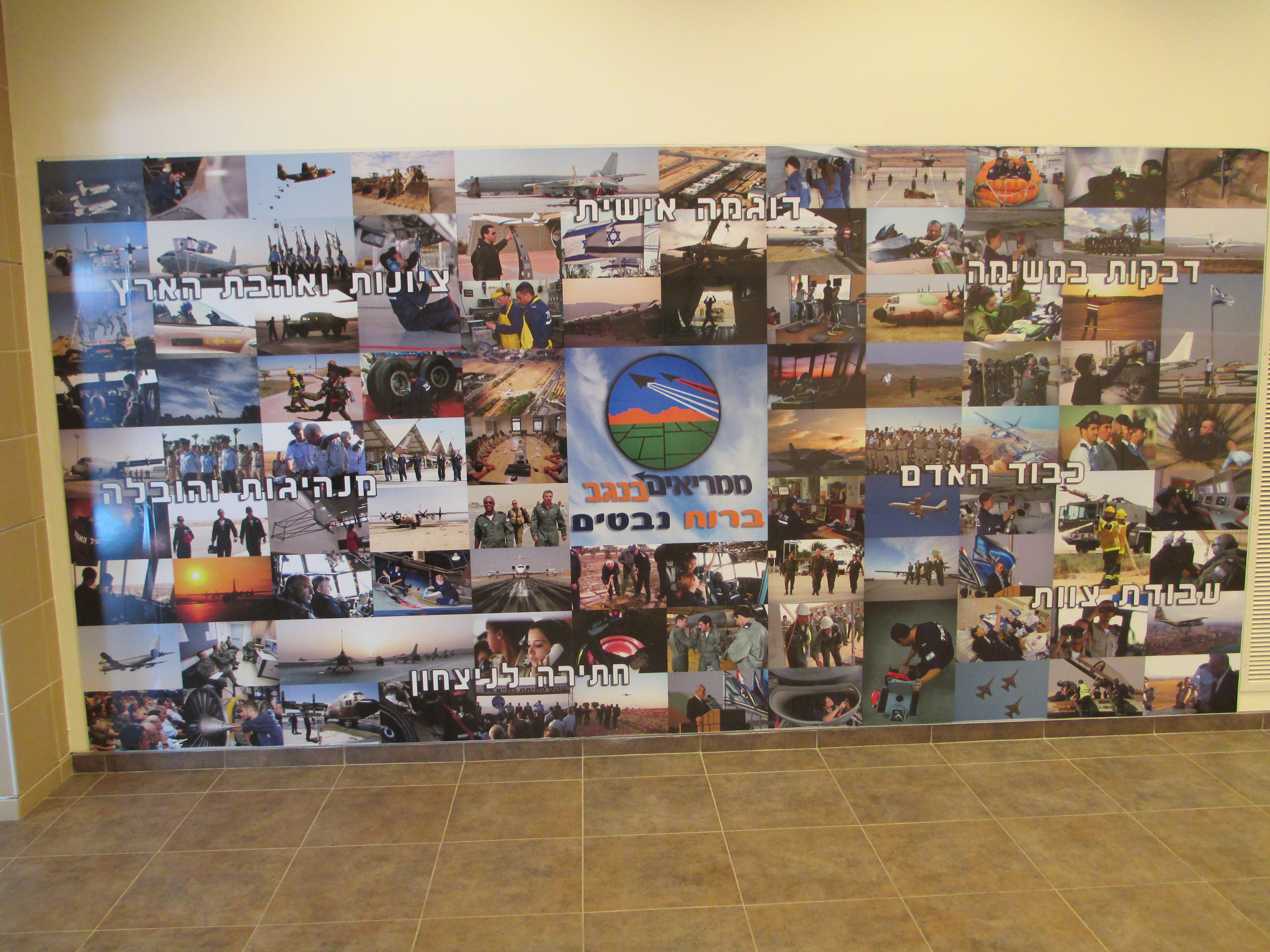
Photo impressions of the Nevatim Airbase in 2013

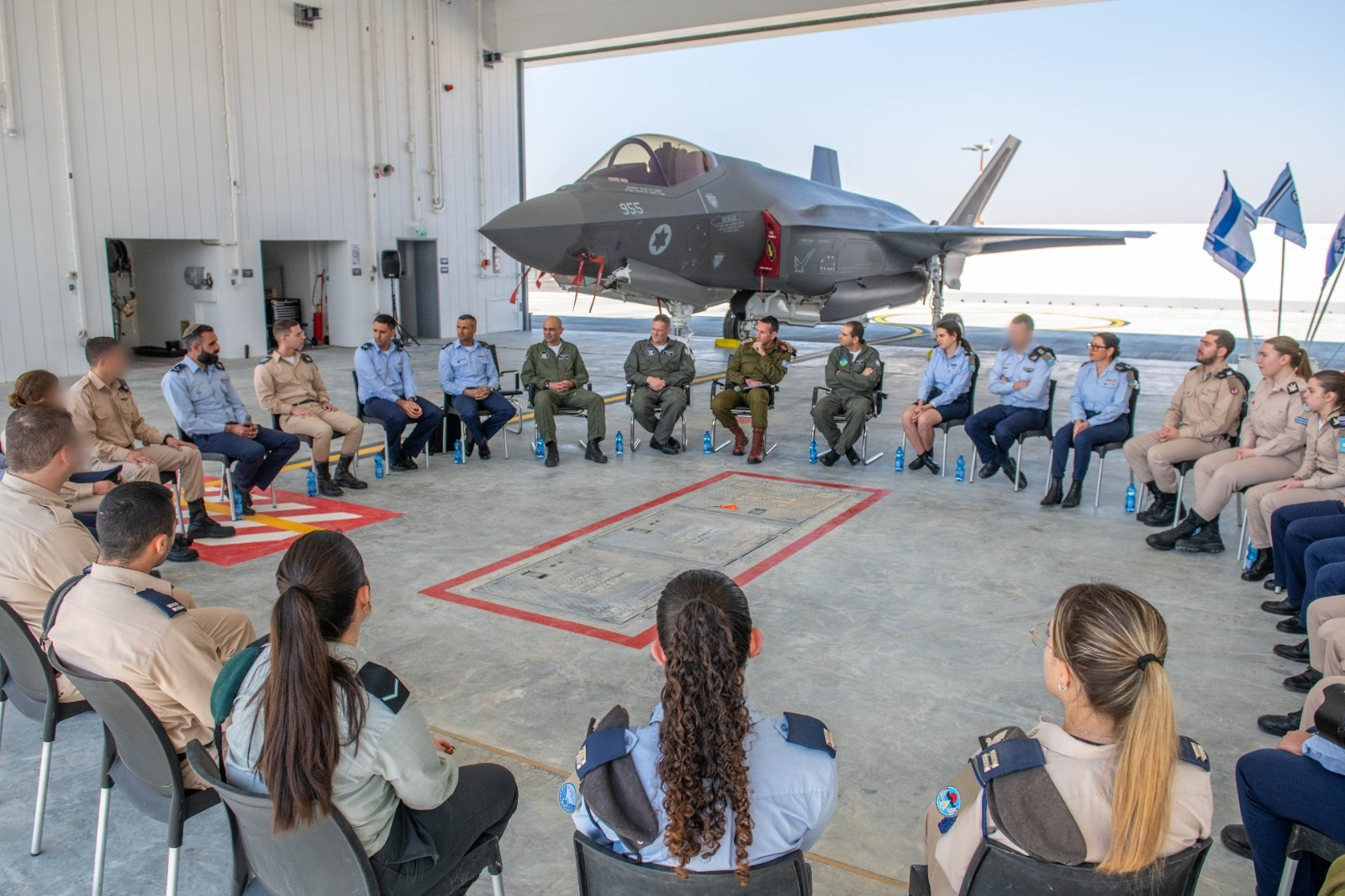
Then IDF Chief of the General Staff Herzi Halevi (brown boots) visited Nevatim Airbase in February 2023

=== Stealth aircraft ===
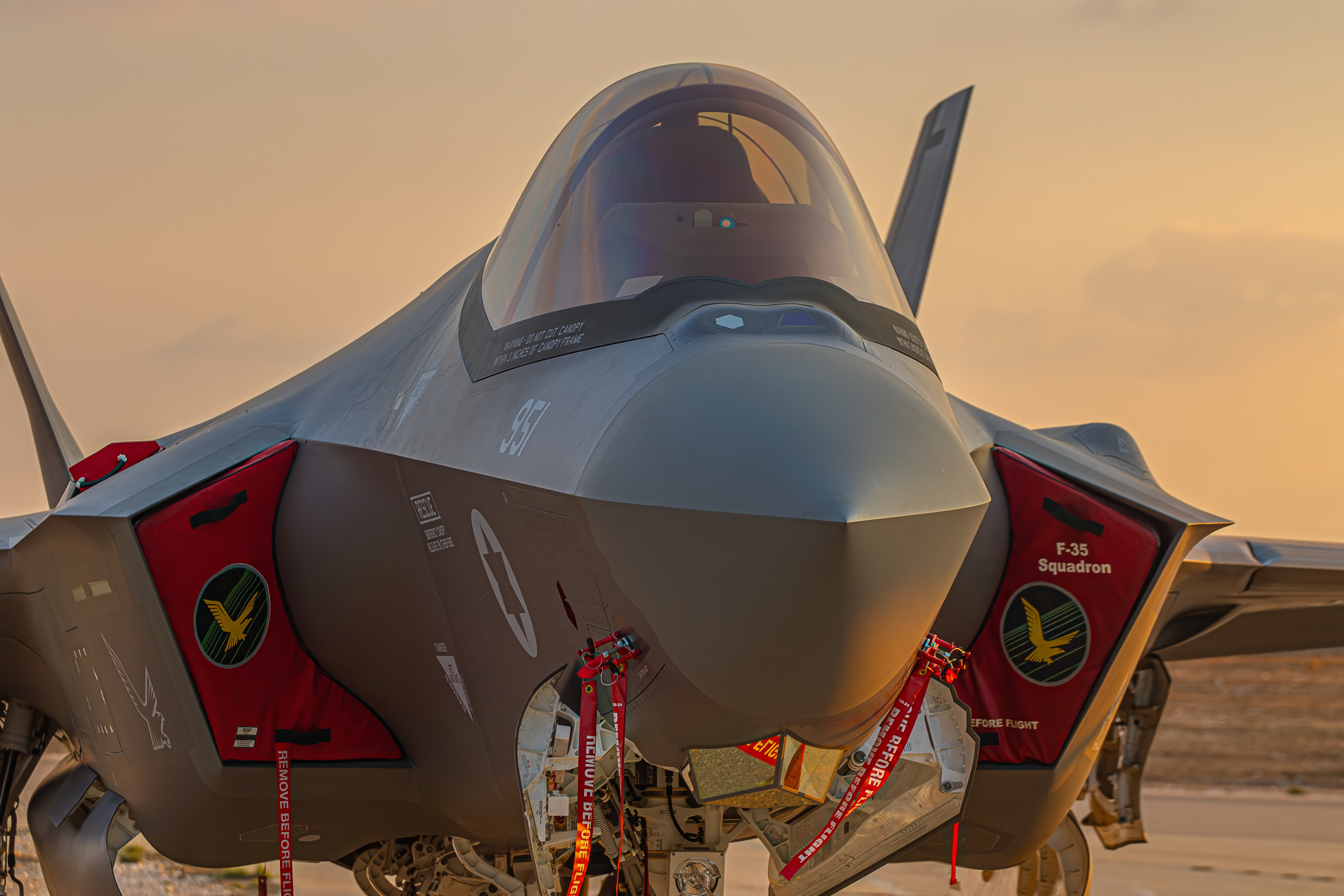
An F-35I Adir of 140 Squadron "Golden Eagle" – up close and personal and from face to face

Since December 2016, F-35I Adir (אדיר, "The Mighty One") stealth fighter jets have been stationed at Nevatim. Israel buys them from a US manufacturer consortium around Lockheed Martin, modified according to its needs. A total of 75 of these stealth jets have been ordered so far, which are to be delivered by the end of the 2020s. This will fill up three squadrons, all of which are already set up at Nevatim and will reach full strength by that time. These are the 116 Squadron "Lions Of The South", the 117 Squadron "First Jet" and the 140 Squadron "Golden Eagle", all of which have a longer history on other bases and with other aircraft (see above and also Units).

In early May 2026, it was announced that the IAF would establish a fourth squadron of F-35I – adding another 25 stealth jets. The location where it will be stationed has not yet been disclosed.

==== Flight simulator ====
Parallel to the introduction of the F-35I, a flight simulator was also installed at Nevatim, which is intended to familiarize new pilots with the aircraft before they sit in the cockpit for the first time and to familiarize experienced pilots with combat situations without putting themselves in danger.

==== First combat missions ====
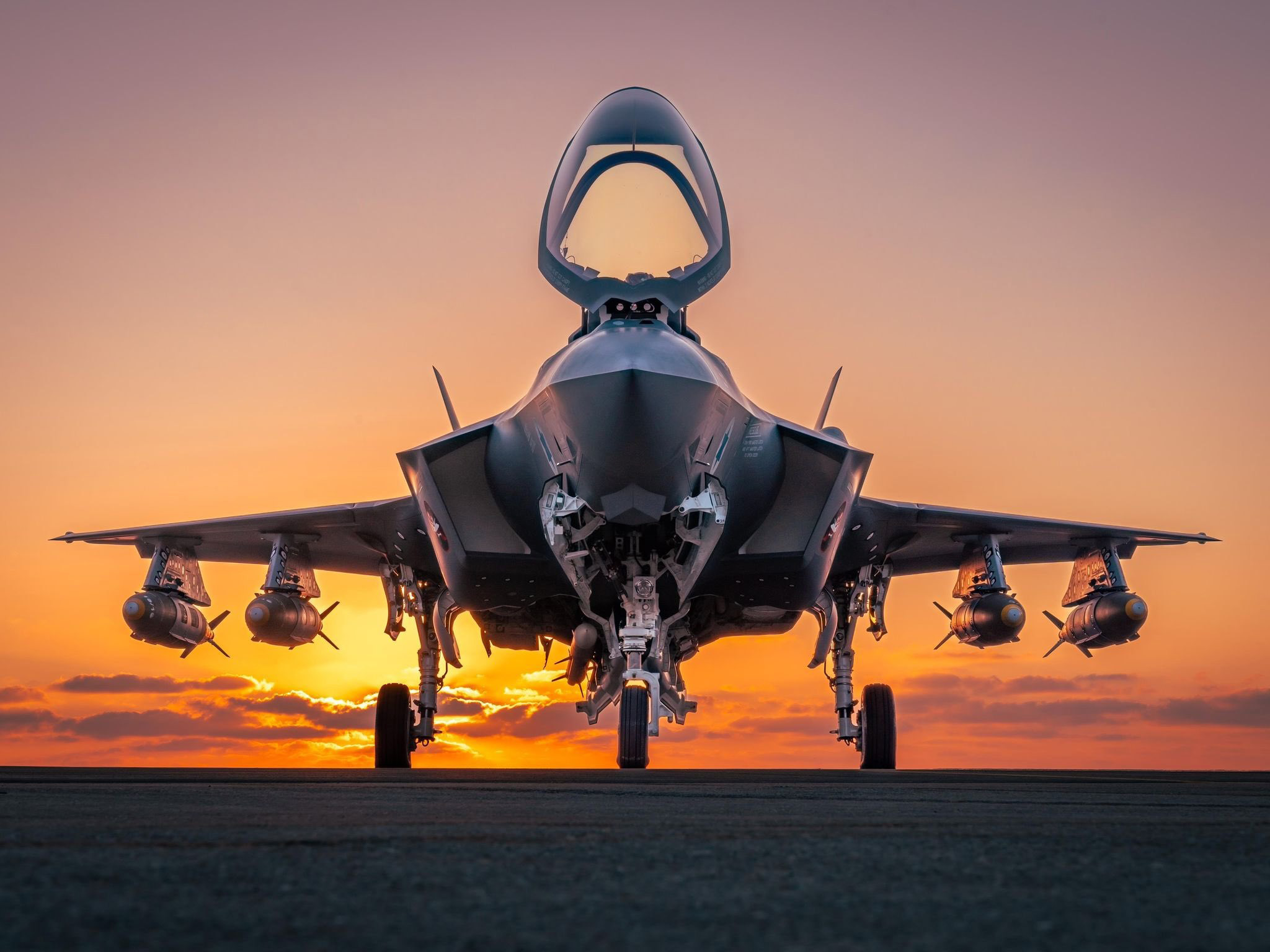
An F-35I Adir in "Beast Mode"

After a year-long testing and training phase, Israel officially declared the base's first eight F-35Is operational at the beginning of December 2017. On 22 May 2018, Israel's then Air Force commander, Major General Amikam Norkin, reported that Israel became the first country in the world to use the F-35 in combat during recent clashes with Iran in Syria. In July 2019, Nevatim-based F-35Is twice attacked Iranian missile depots located north and northeast of the Iraqi capital Baghdad.

==== Gaza war and "Beast Mode" ====
In March 2025, the IAF confirmed that since the outbreak of the Gaza war on 7 October 2023, it had flown thousands of sorties in all combat theaters with its F-35I Adir stealth jets, including using "external munitions". In this configuration, known as "Beast Mode," up to four bombs or missiles are mounted directly under the wings. The F-35 normally carries weapons internally, maintaining its stealth capabilities. With external weapons, it isn't stealthy anymore, but this seems less important in the Gaza conflict, since Hamas does not have air defense.

Both the USAF and the IAF are developing external fuel tanks for their F-35 stealth jets, either under the wings and jettisonable, or so-called CFTs (Conformal Fuel Tanks), which are mounted tightly along the fuselage. The latters must be stealthy, as they cannot be jettisoned. The IAF is a pioneer in the development of CFTs on its F-15 and F-16 fighter jets.

=== Transport aircraft ===
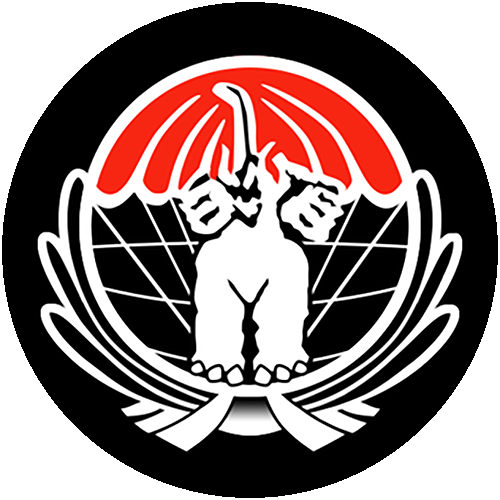

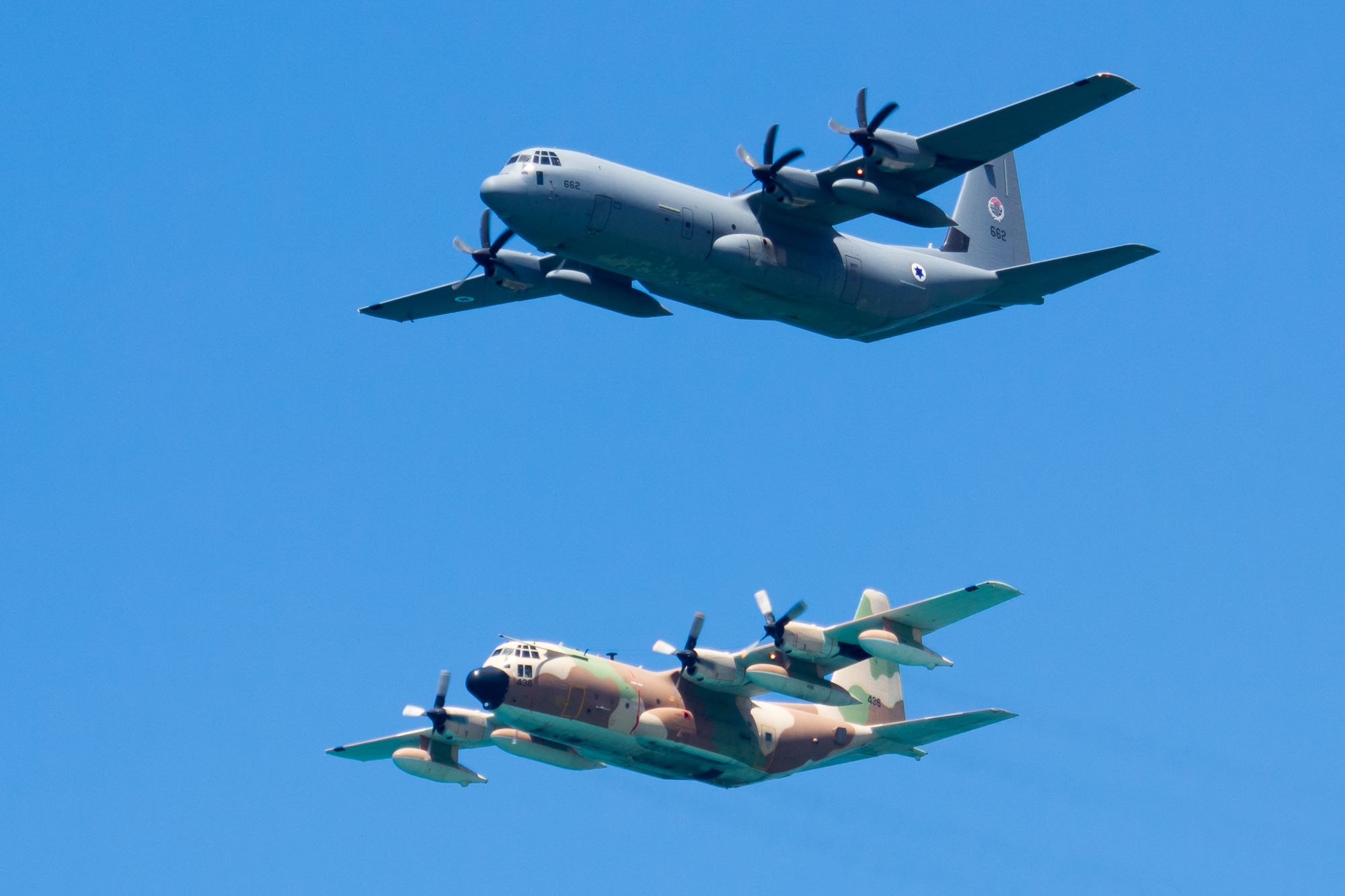
C-130H Karnaf (below) and C-130J Shimshon during a flyby on Israeli Independence Day in May 2016

The 103 Squadron "Elephants" was established during the Palestine War in July 1948 at Ramat David Airbase and from then on flew various transport aircraft at several bases. In 2008, it finally moved its C-130H Hercules Karnaf from the former Lod Airbase (military section of the Ben Gurion Airport) to Nevatim Airbase. In 2014, the squadron received the improved C-130J-30 Super Hercules Shimshon, which it continues to fly today.

The 131 Squadron "Knights Of The Yellow Bird" was established in October 1973 during the Yom Kippur War at the former Lod Airbase (Ben Gurion Airport) and flew the C-130E/H Hercules Karnaf from the outset. In 2008, the 131 Squadron finally relocated with its remaining C-130Hs, along with the 103 Squadron, to Nevatim Airbase. After the withdrawal of 103, 131, 120 and 122 Squadron (see below under Units), Lod Airbase was closed and Ben Gurion became a purely civilian airport.

=== Tanker aircraft ===

The 120 Squadron "Desert Giants" (former "International Squadron" at Lod Airbase) consists of Boeing 707 Re'em tanker aircraft dating back to the 1970s and stationed at Nevatim since 2008. They will be replaced by newer Boeing KC-46A Gideon aircraft in the coming years. At the beginning of 2021, Israel signed a preliminary contract for initially two tanker aircraft; in the medium term, up to eight examples are planned, which are to be delivered from around 2025.

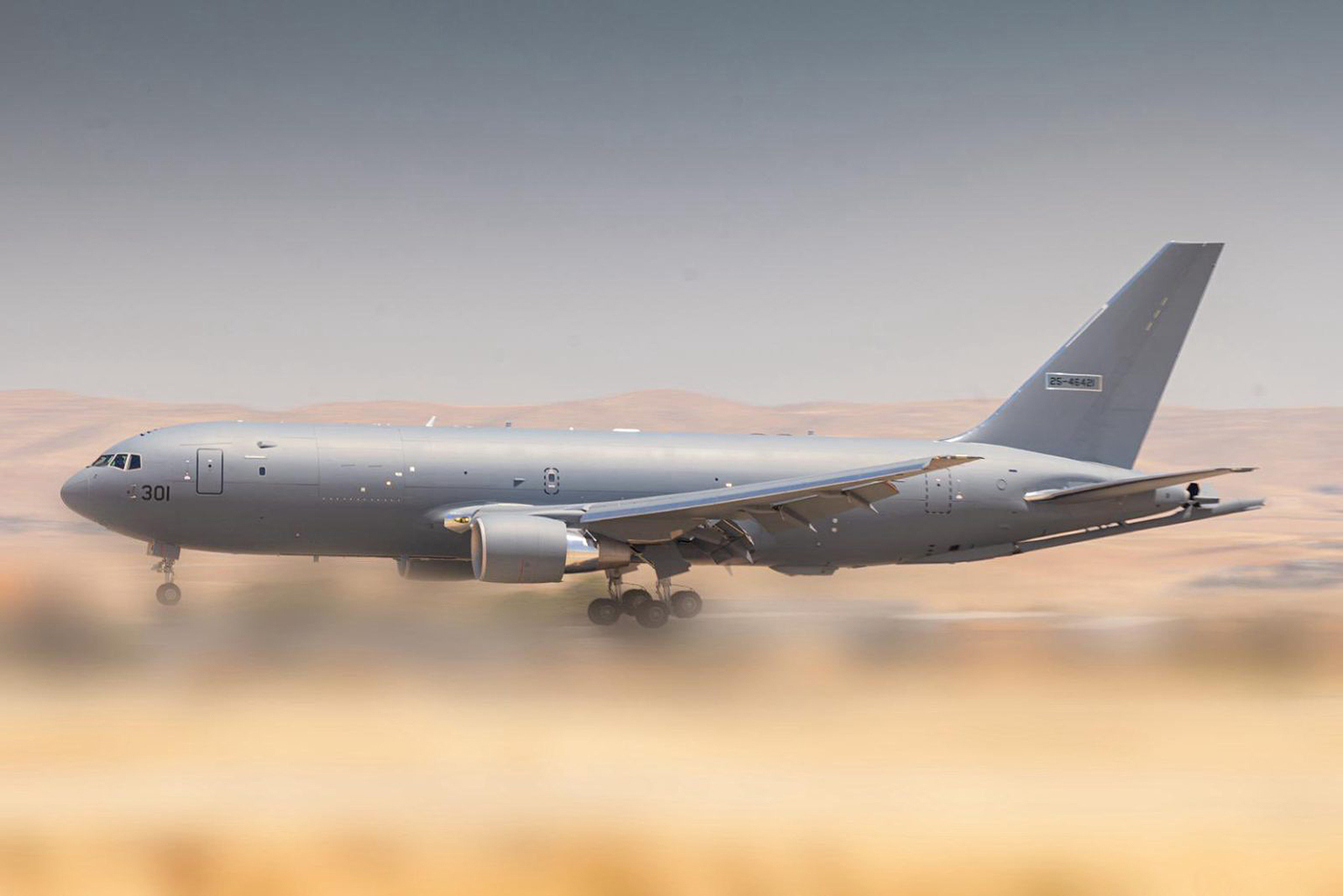
The first Boeing KC-46 Gideon lands at Nevatim on 27 May 2026

In November 2024, it was announced that Boeing had begun production of the first of four tanker aircraft for Israel and that there's an option for eight more, so a total of 12. In addition, new large hangars will be built for all Gideon tankers. At the end of August 2025, the number of tanker aircraft ordered by Israel increased to six.

In late May 2026, the first Boeing KC-46A Gideon tanker was delivered to Israel. It landed at Nevatim, joining the existing 707 tankers stationed there, which continue their service for the time being. The Gideon tankers will initially form a new 46 Squadron Gideon, named after this aircraft type. In the future, the 46 Squadron is slated to merge with the 120 Squadron and adopt the name Gideon. Then the 707s will be gradually taken out of service.

=== Reconnaissance aircraft ===

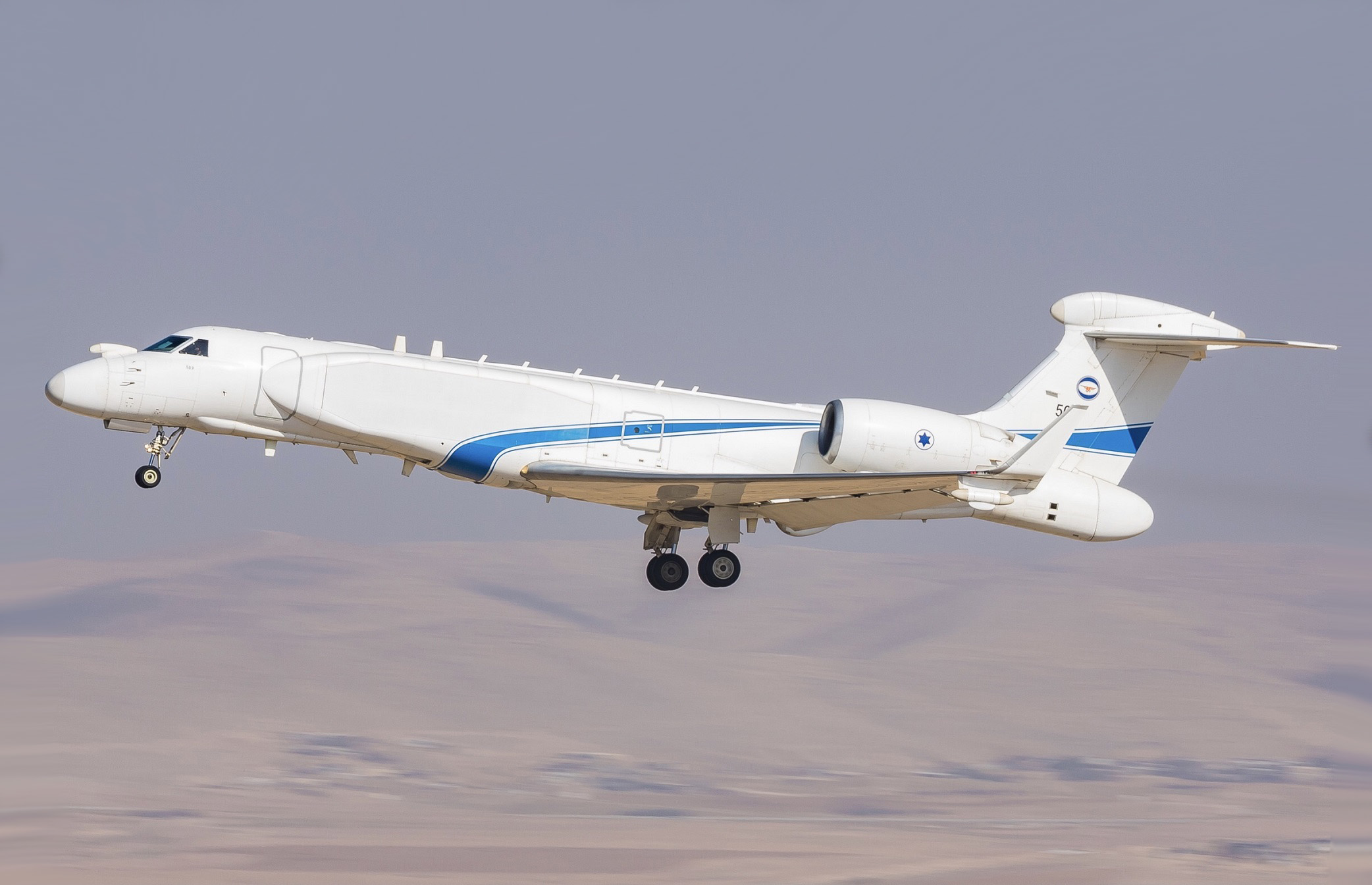
A G550 CAEW Eitam in November 2020 during an exercise of the IAF with the Cypriot National Guard

The 122 Squadron "Nachshon", which has existed since 1971, operates several Gulfstream jets in different configurations at Nevatim: three GV SEMA Shavit aircraft since 2005, five G550 CAEW Eitam aircraft since 2008 and the G550 ELINT/COMINT Oron since 2021, all of them for various tasks, such as electronic reconnaissance and surveillance, early warning, photo reconnaissance, etc. also for the Israeli Navy. The purchase of additional machines of the latest type is in progress.

=== Israeli Air Force One ===
The Nevatim Airbase is also the home base of the so-called Israeli Air Force One, a converted Boeing 767 for international visits by the President of Israel or the Prime Minister. Officially called Wing of Zion, it is operated by the IAF, maintained by 120 Squadron and has its own hangar at Nevatim. The purchase and maintenance of this machine are very controversial in Israel, which led to it being shut down before it was put into operation in 2022. After Benjamin Netanyahu was re-elected as Prime Minister at the end of 2022, the Wing of Zion was finally put into operation in the course of 2023 and made its first official flight in July 2024.

=== Gallery ===
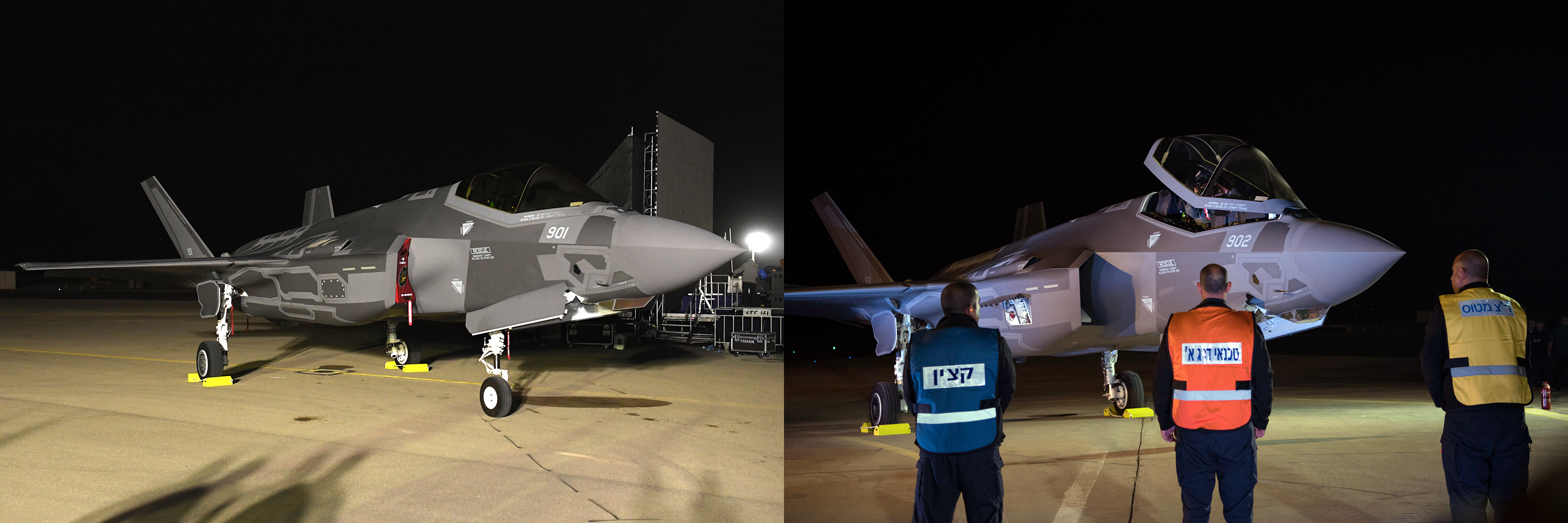
The first two F-35I Adir (No. 901 and No. 902) arrived at Nevatim on the evening of 12 December 2016

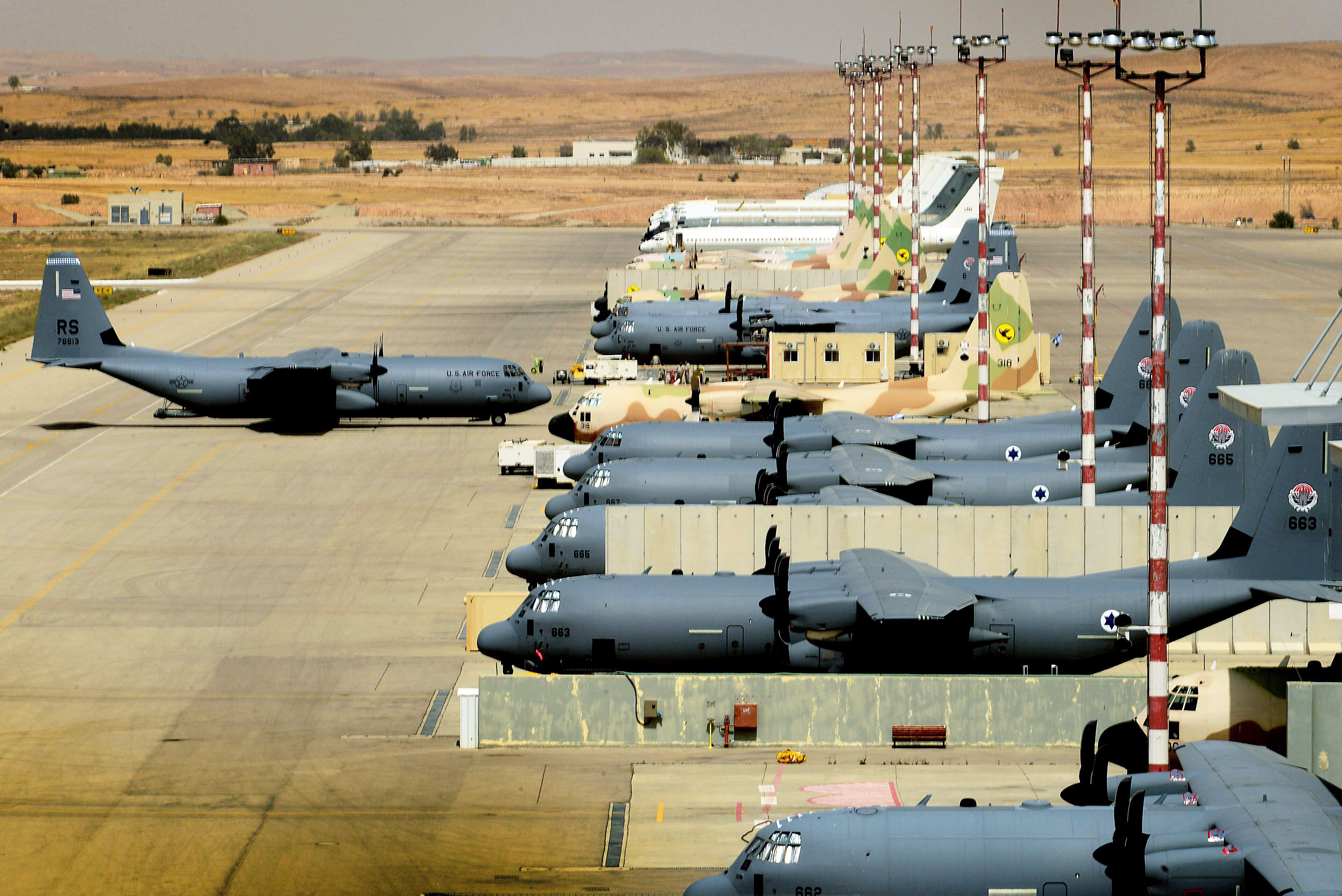
C-130J (gray), C-130H (beige) and Boeing 707 tankers (white) near the southern Nevatim runway in 2017

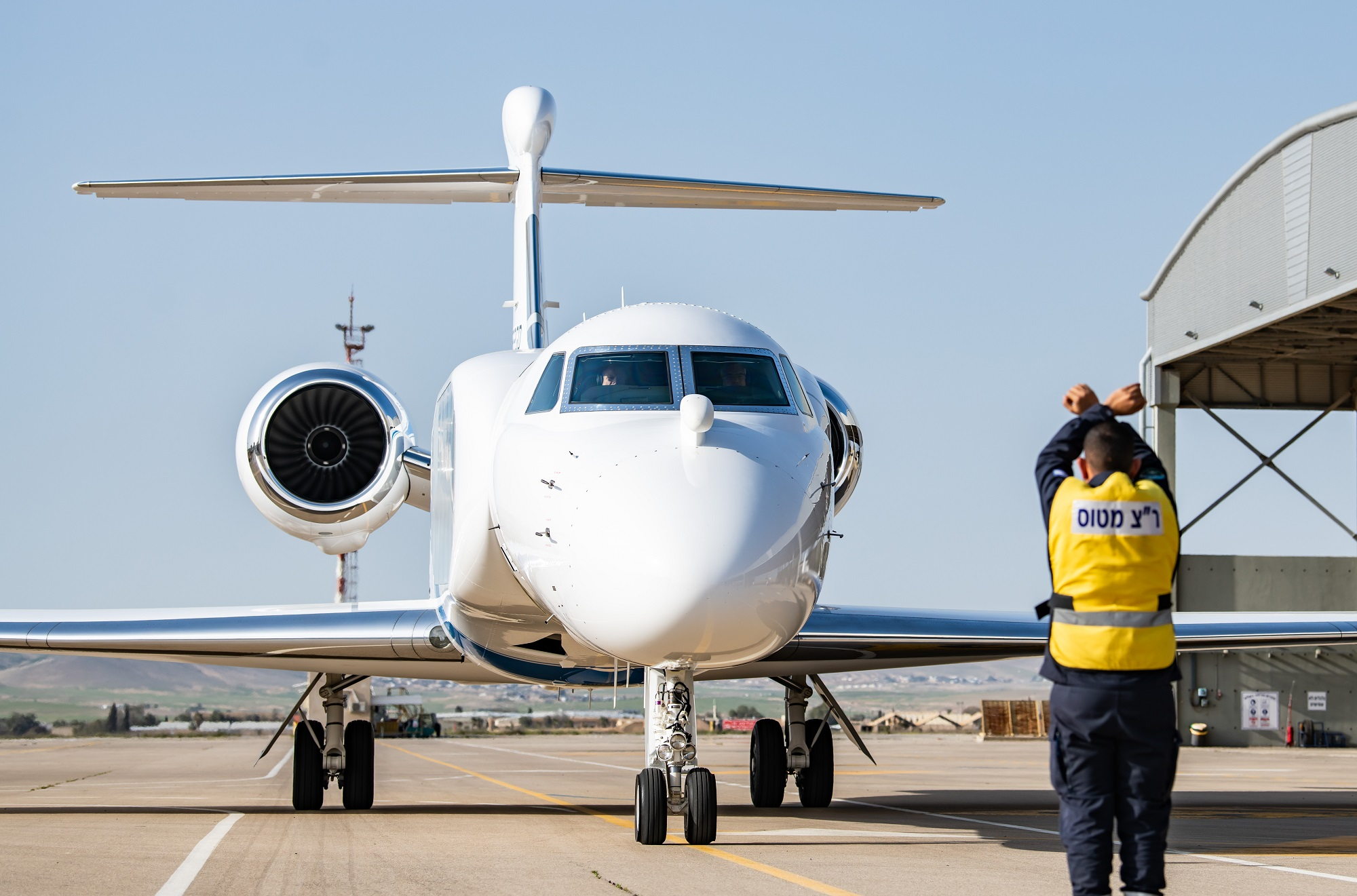
A G550 ELINT/COMINT Oron is being marshaled into its parking position at Nevatim in April 2021

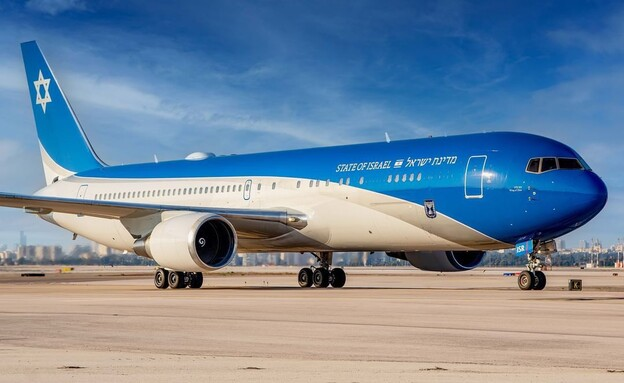
The Wing of Zion aka Israeli Air Force One (a Boeing 767) has its hangar at the Nevatim Airbase

=== Nuclear weapons ===
Even before the US Air Force announced in early March 2024 that its F-35 stealth jets are now certified for use with B61-12 atomic bombs, there was a discussion about whether the Israeli F-35I Adir jets at Nevatim are capable of transporting and dropping Israeli nuclear weapons. For this purpose, these weapons would have to be stored on the base in specially secured bunkers.

=== 2024 Iranian attacks ===
In April 2024 the air base suffered an attack from Iran as part of the 2024 Iran–Israel conflict; according to an analysis of satellite images by Associated Press, there was only minor damage.

In the October 2024 Iranian attack, videos geolocated by CNN showed a significant number of Iranian missiles hitting the base. Iranian media reported that several of Israel's most advanced aircraft had been destroyed, without providing evidence to support this assertion.

The IDF stated: "Tonight's Iranian ballistic missile attack has had no operational impact on the IAF and its ongoing airstrikes against terror targets in both the Gaza Strip and Lebanon". Flight route records indicated that a significant portion of the IAF's Boeing 707, Gulfstream G550 and Lockheed C-130 aircraft were on station off the Israeli coast, either to support IAF fighter activity or put into the air for their own safety in anticipation of attacks on the air bases.

Satellite images taken after the attack showed four apparent impacts of Iranian missiles at the base. One caused a large hole in the roof of a hangar complex near the southern runway. Another missile appeared to have struck a road on the base. The IDF said Iranian missiles damaged "office buildings and other maintenance areas" at its air bases but that no soldiers, weapons or aircraft were hit.

== International Airport ==
Since the international Ben Gurion Airport near Tel Aviv had been reaching its capacity limits for years, there were considerations to convert one of Israel's military airbases completely or partially into a civilian airport or to expand it accordingly. In addition to a complete conversion of Ramat David Airbase in the north of Israel, a dual use of Nevatim Airbase was being discussed, as it could be expanded without major problems because it is surrounded by desert with only few settlements. The proximity to the growing city Beersheba (around 15 km) also spoke for this. The IAF was strongly opposed to this latter proposal as it believed it would restrict military flight movements too much.

At the end of January 2025, the Knesset decided to have a plan drawn up by the end of the year on how an international airport could be set up at Nevatim. This does not mean that it will actually be built, but all options will first be examined as to how and where an airport can be built there. However, the events after 7 October 2023 have also shown how intensively the IAF uses the Nevatim airbase to carry out all of its tasks, such as the intensive operations in the Gaza Strip and West Bank, in Lebanon and Syria, the long-range retaliatory strikes in Iran and against the Houthis in Yemen. If a dual airport in Nevatim comes about, operations from there like in the past will no longer be possible.

A Knesset committee advanced plans to build the airport in March of 2025, following lobbying by "Negev Takes Off from Nevatim", an advocacy group of residents from the Negev and Jezreel Valley. Later that year, in July, it was reported that Prime Minister Benjamin Netanyahu decided that the airport would be built at the Ziklag archeological site, west of Rahat. Also in July 2025, Israel's National Planning and Construction Council approved a review of plans for two international airports at Ramat David and Ziklag, including environmental adjustments, a review of security aspects, and addressing existing construction constraints. In February 2026, the Israeli government had finally approved the construction of the two international airports at the locations mentioned above.

== Units ==
- 46 Squadron "Gideon" – operating Boeing KC-46A Gideon tankers – will merge with 120 Squadron in the future
- 103 Squadron "Elephants" – operating the C-130J-30 Super Hercules Shimshon
- 116 Squadron "Lions Of The South" – operating the F-35I Adir since November 2019
- 117 Squadron "First Jet" – operating the F-35I Adir, initially for pilot training since July 2021
- 120 Squadron "Desert Giants" – operating the Boeing 707 Re'em as a flying tanker, being replaced by KC-46 Gideon tankers
- 122 Squadron "Nachshon" – operating the GV Shavit and G550 Eitam & Oron as SEMA/CAEW/ELINT/COMINT ⃰ planes
- 131 Squadron "Knights Of The Yellow Bird" – operating the C-130H Hercules Karnaf
- 140 Squadron "Golden Eagle" – operating the F-35I Adir since December 2016
- Operating the Wing of Zion with its own hangar aka Israeli Air Force One, maintained by 120 Squadron
- Unit 5700 – Forward Airfield Tactical Unit (Special unit, at Nevatim since 2009)
- Defender Of The Negev – Company of the Netzah Yehuda Battalion for the defense of the base

⃰ SEMA = Special Electronic Mission Aircraft, CAEW = Conformal Airborne Early Warning, ELINT = Electronic Intelligence, COMINT = Communication Intelligence

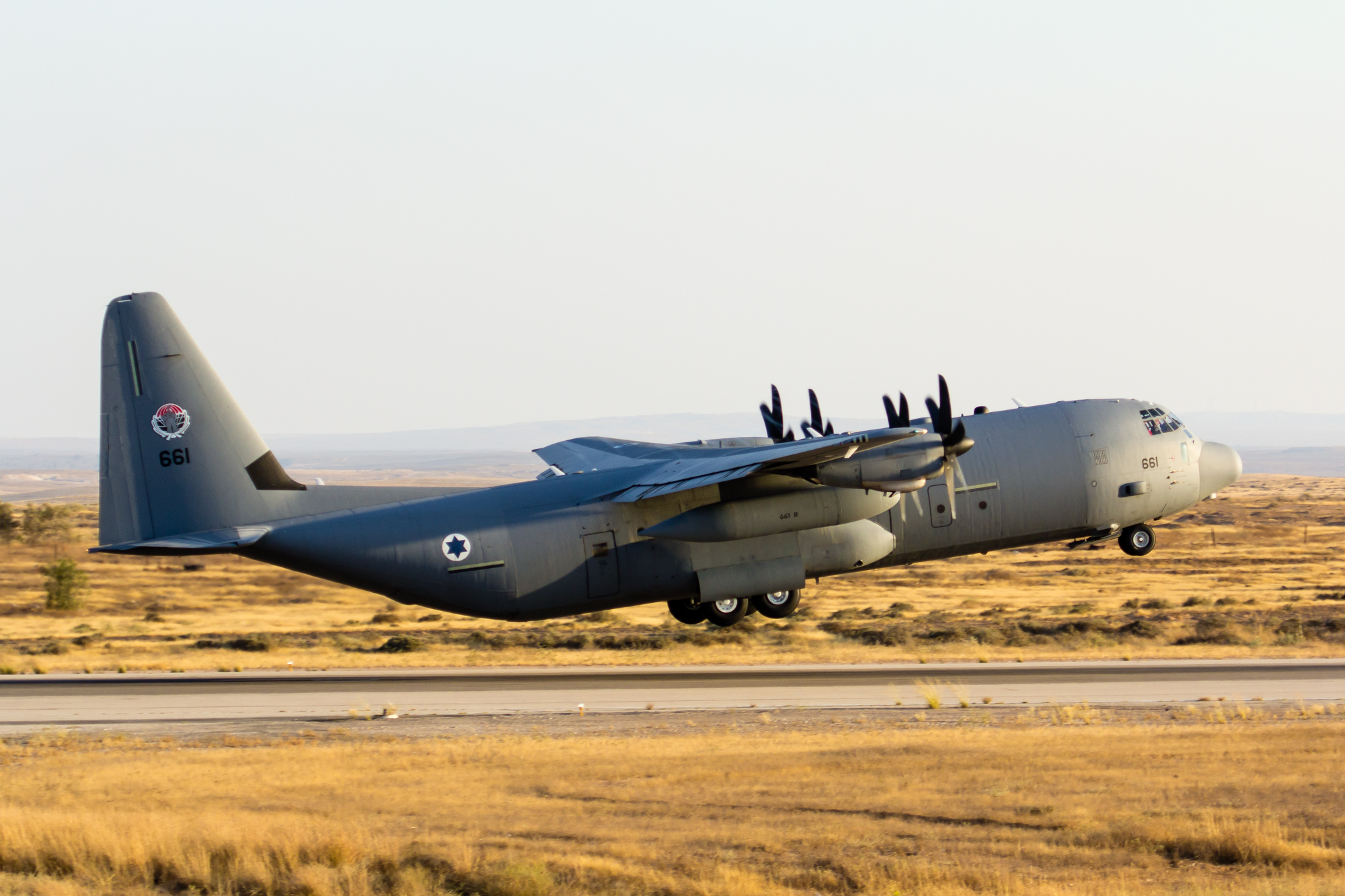
C-130J-30 Super Hercules Shimshon of 103 Squadron "Elephants" (see tail) at Hatzerim Airbase in June 2015

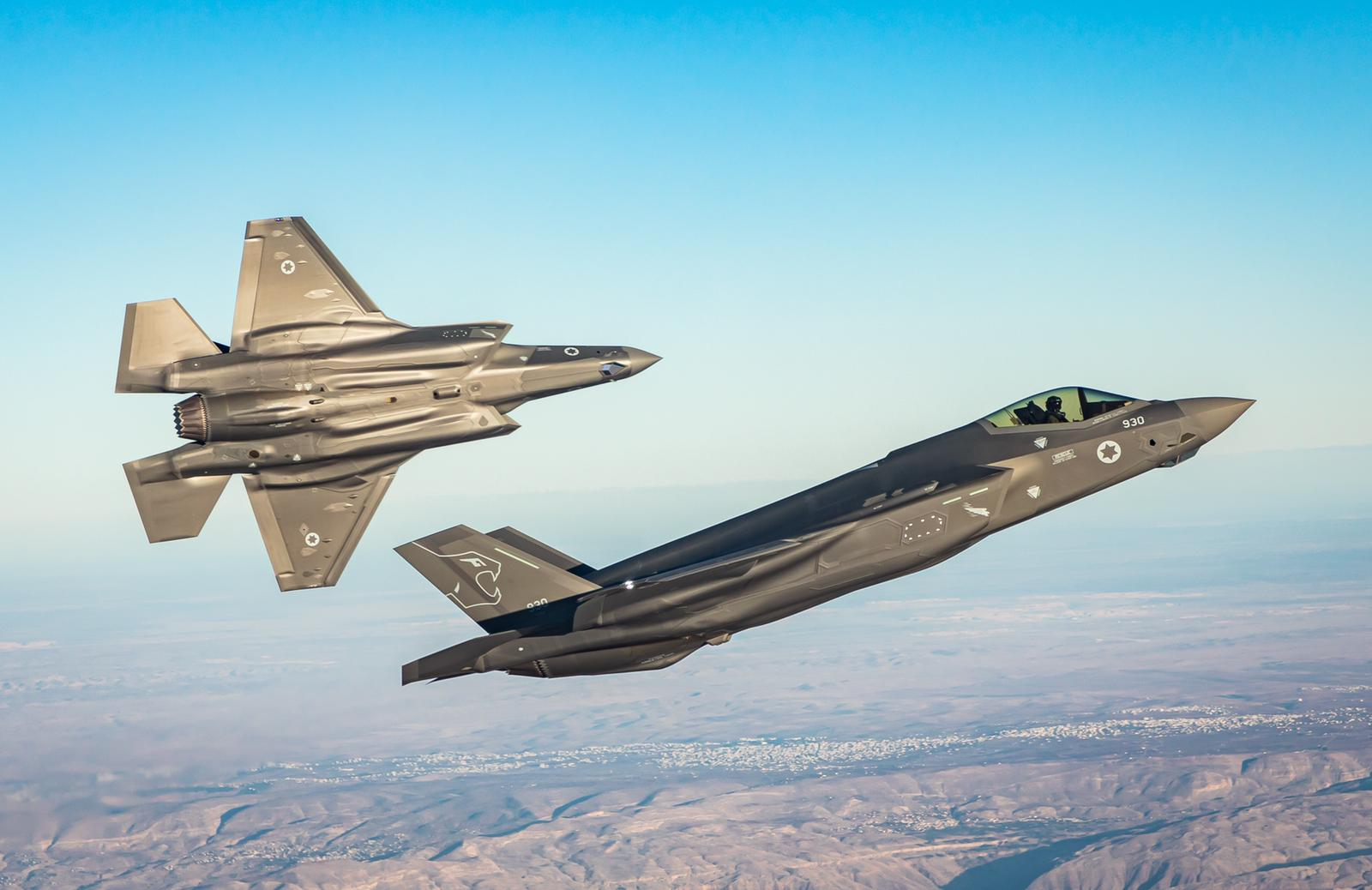
F-35I Adir of 116 Squadron "Lions Of The South" (see lion symbol on tail and logo on intake) in January 2020

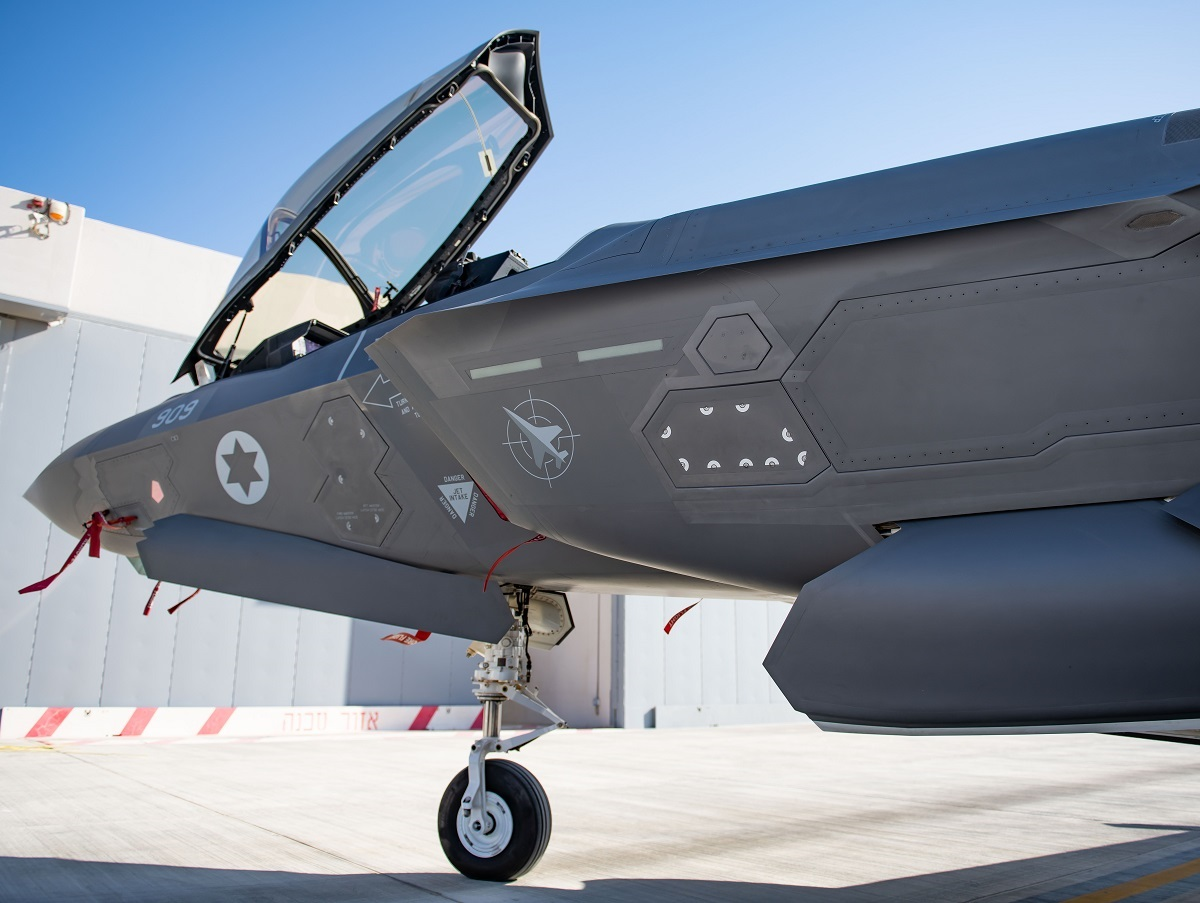
An F-35I Adir of 117 Squadron "First Jet" (see jet-in-the-crosshairs symbol) at the reopening in July 2021

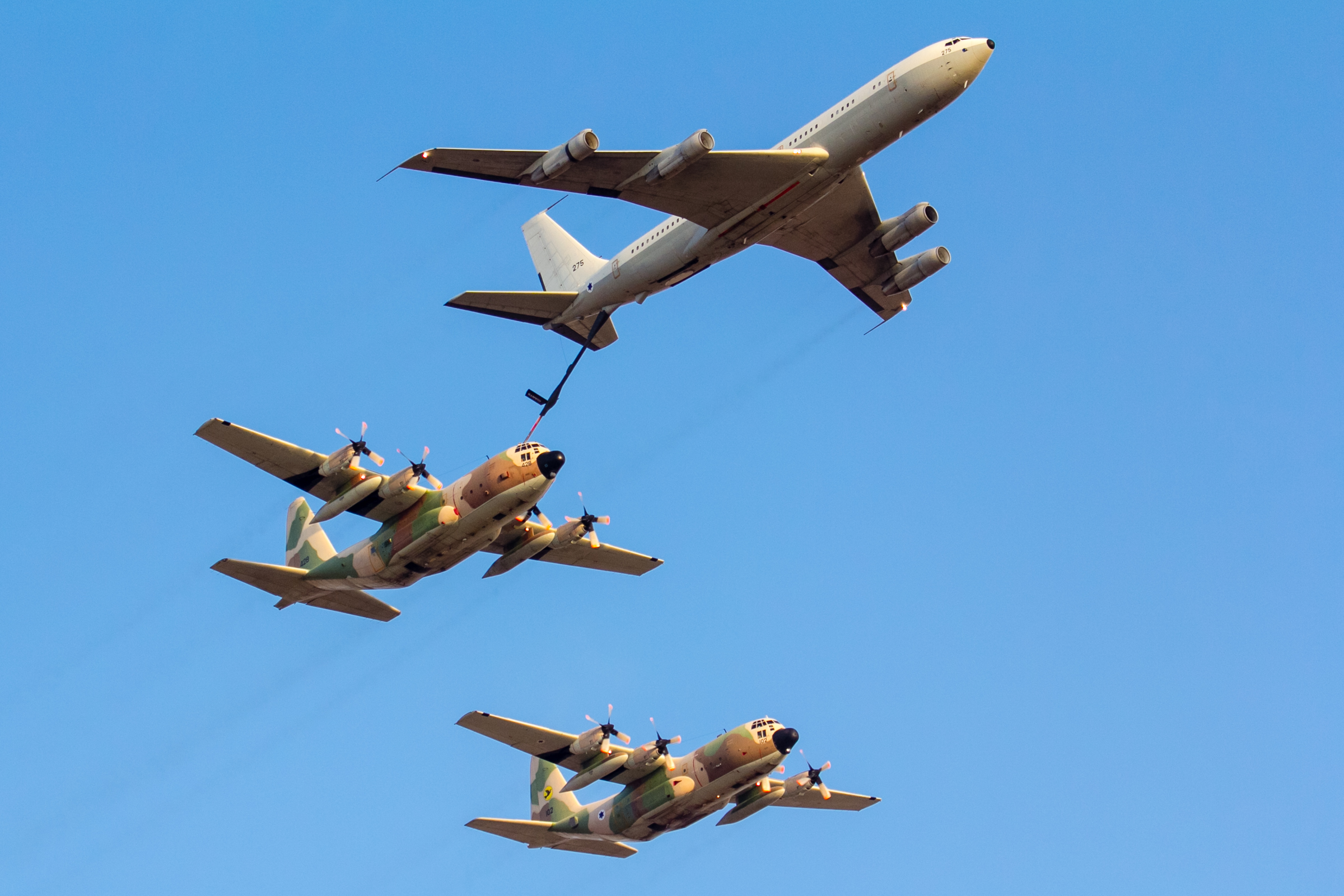
A Boeing 707 Re'em refueling a C-130H Hercules Karnaf of Squadrons 120 and 131 in June 2016

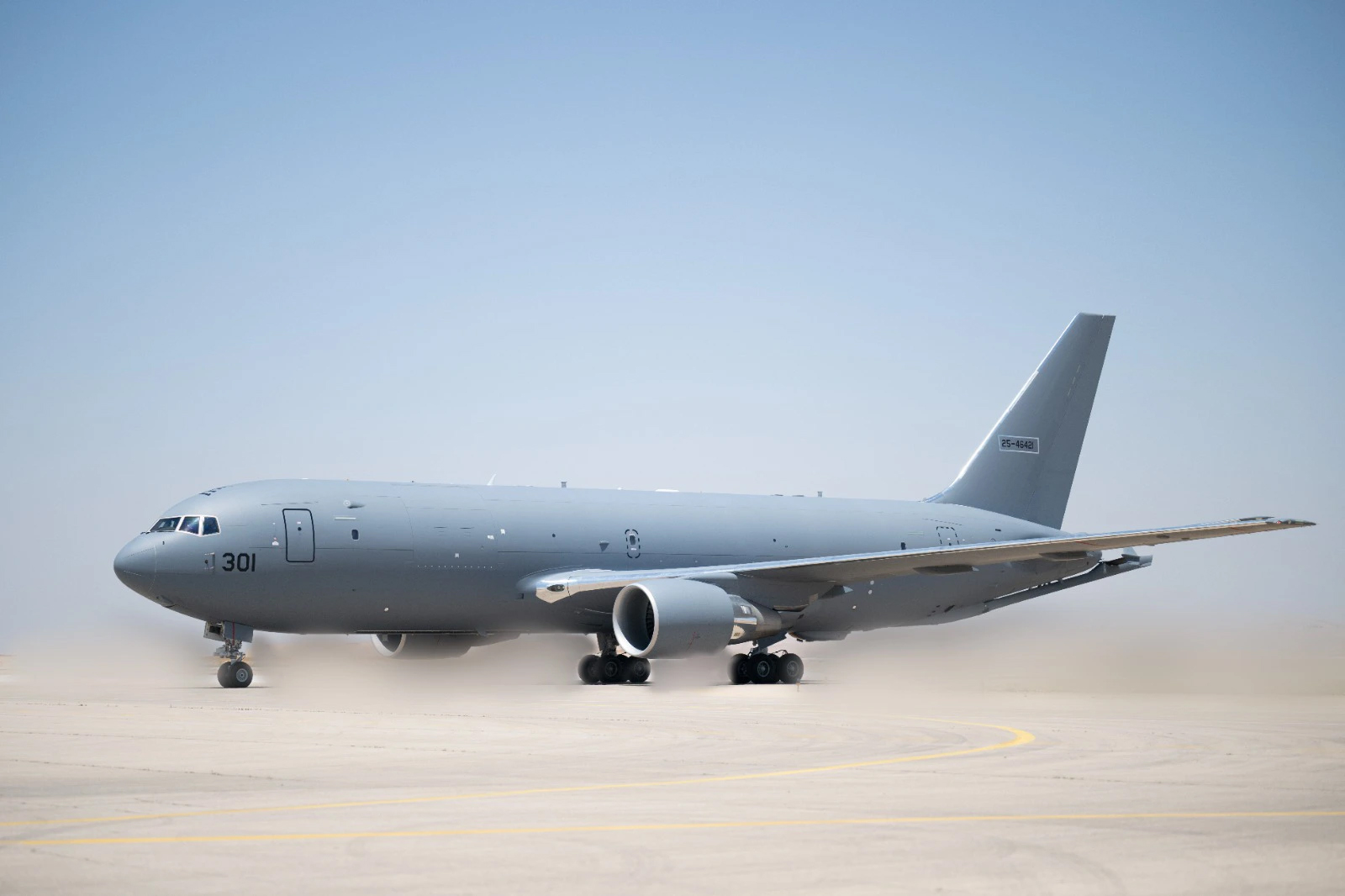
New Boeing KC-46 Gideon tankers are about to replace the aging Boeing 707s on Nevatim

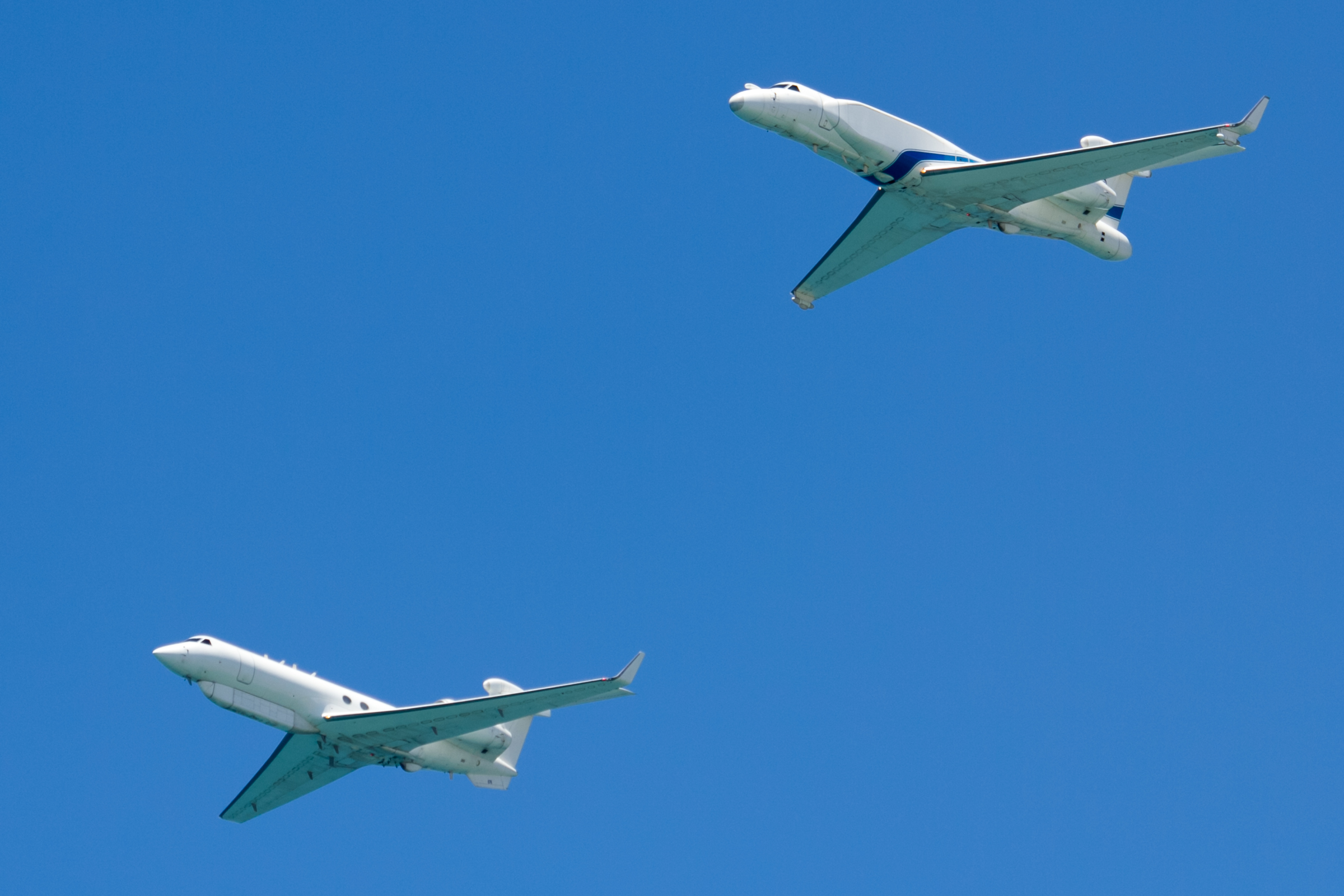
A GV Shavit (bottom left) and a G550 Eitam of 122 Squadron "Nachshon" on Independence Day in May 2016

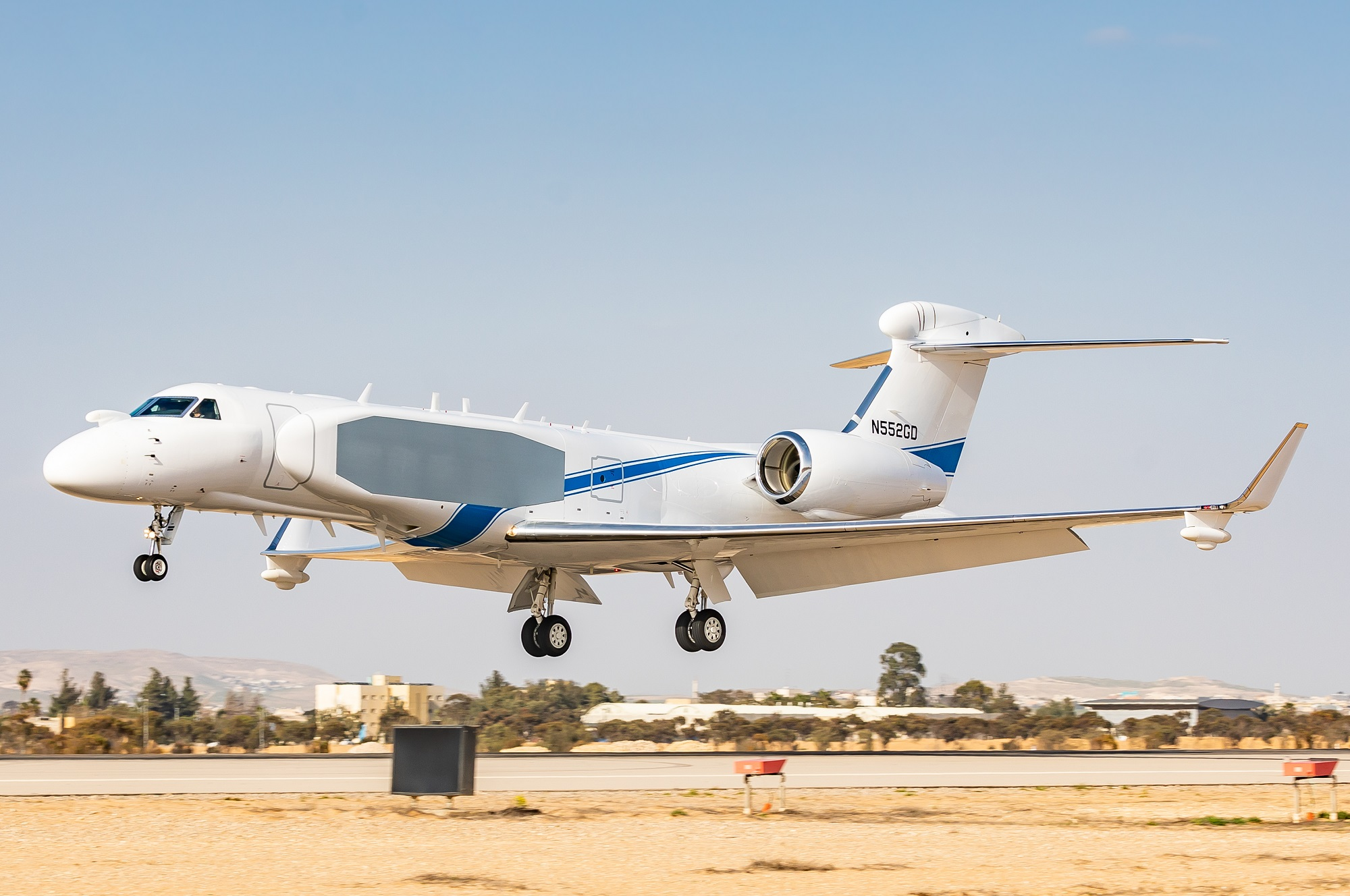
A newly arrived G550 Oron for 122 Squadron "Nachshon" at Nevatim Airbase in April 2021

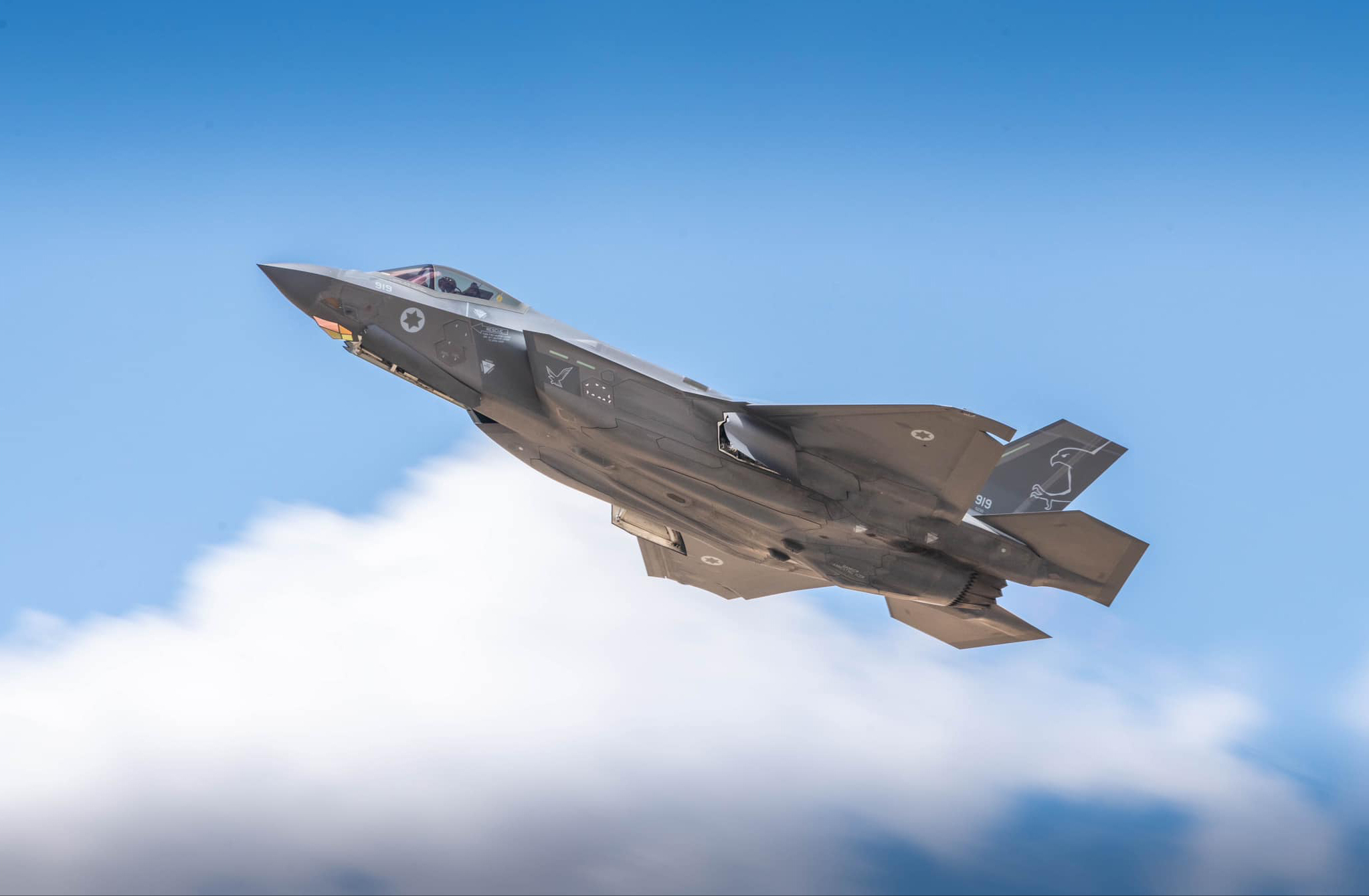
An F-35I Adir of 140 Squadron "Golden Eagle" (see eagle symbols) just launched in June 2023

Note: IAF aircraft can usually be assigned to their squadron by the symbols on the tail or the air intakes

== Accidents ==
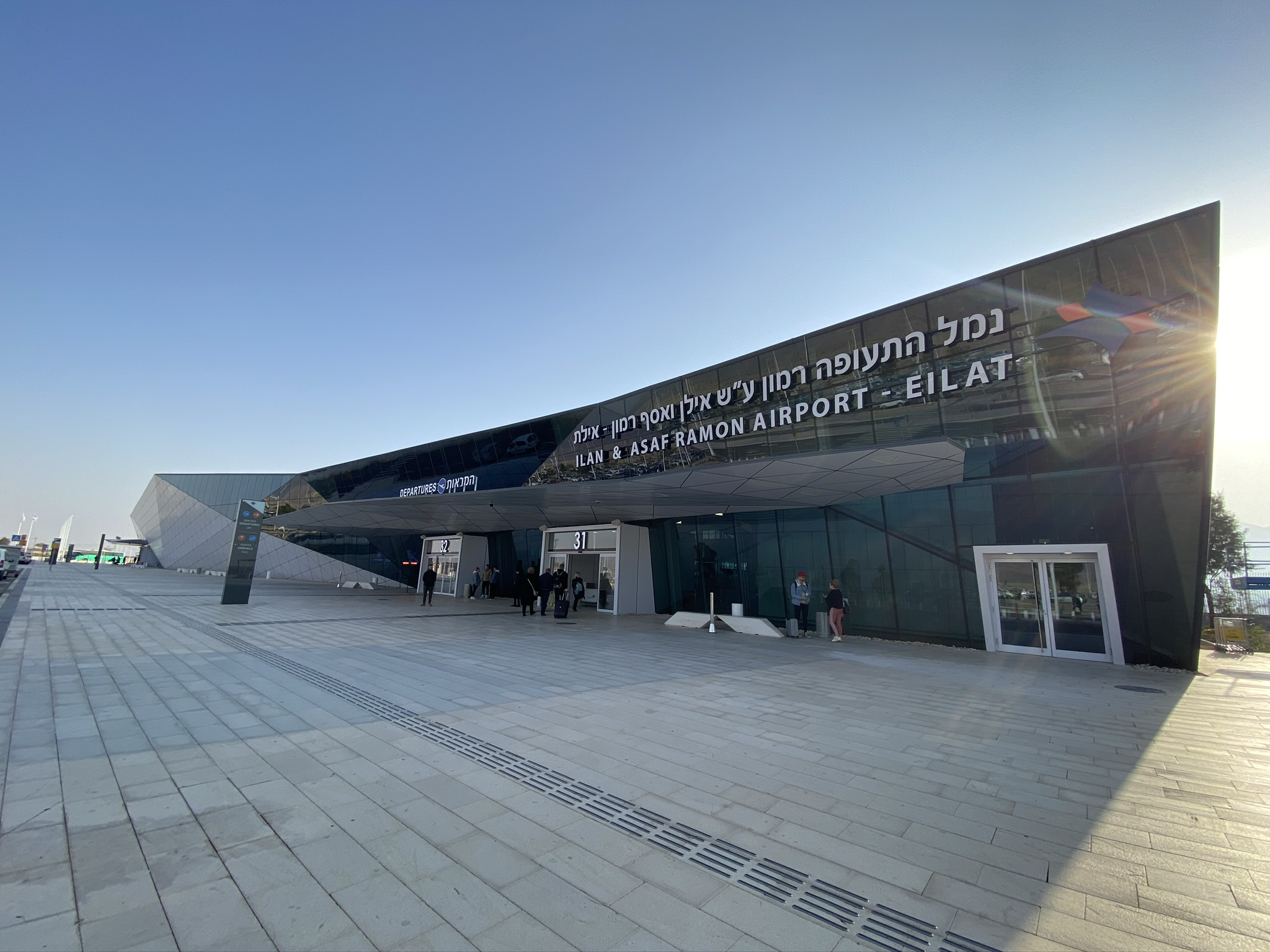
Ilan & Asaf Ramon International Airport north of Eilat

- In May 1983, an A-4 Skyhawk Ayit of 116 Squadron "Lions Of The South" from Nevatim and an F-15D Eagle Baz from Tel Nof Airbase collided in mid-air during an exercise over the Negev Desert in southern Israel. While the A-4 pilot ejected and suffered injuries, the two-seat F-15D managed to land safely at the nearby Ramon Airbase, although its right wing was almost completely torn off in the collision.
- On 13 September 2009, an F-16A from Nevatim crashed over mountainous terrain during a training flight in the southern West Bank. Since the 21-year-old pilot Assaf Ramon had not reported any problems before the crash, it was assumed that he had suddenly fainted as a result of the high speed and G-force conditions to which he was subjected. Assaf Ramon was the son of Ilan Ramon, Israel's first astronaut, who died in the Space Shuttle Columbia disaster in 2003. Ramon Airport near Eilat is named after these two men (see photo on the right).
