= Amikam Norkin =

Israeli general and former commander of the Israeli Air Force

- עמיקם נורקין
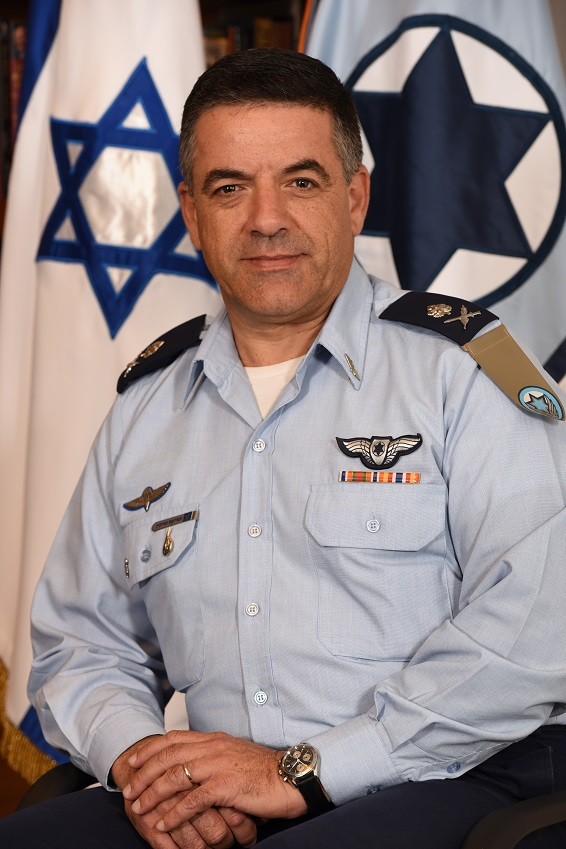
- Official portrait, 2017

Commander of the Israeli Air Force
- In office August 10, 2017 – April 4, 2022
- Prime Minister: Benjamin Netanyahu; Naftali Bennett
- IDF Chief: Aviv Kochavi
- Preceded by: Amir Eshel
- Succeeded by: Tomer Bar

Personal details
- Born: December 20, 1966 (age 59) Beit She'arim, Israel
- Education: University of Haifa

Military service
- Allegiance: Israel
- Branch/service: Israeli Air Force
- Years of service: 1984–present
- Rank: Major General
- Commands: 133 Squadron; 253 Squadron; Tel Nof Airbase; IAF Chief of Air Staff; IDF Planning Directorate; Israeli Air Force
- Battles/wars: 2006 Lebanon War; Operation Guardian of the Walls

Aluf (Major General) Amikam Norkin (Hebrew: עמיקם נורקין; born December 20, 1966) is a retired Israeli general, who served as commander of the Israeli Air Force (IAF) from 2017 to 2022. Before his selection to succeed Amir Eshel as commander of the IAF, Norkin served as head of the IDF Planning Directorate.

== Biography ==
Norkin was born in Beit She'arim to olim of Romanian-Jewish origin. His maternal grandfather was among the founders of Nahalal and his paternal grandfather was one of the first members of Agudat Hashomrim. Norkin is named after his father's cousin, Amikam Shamai, who was killed on May 16, 1966, when his jeep drove over a Syrian landmine. He attended WIZO Agricultural High School in Nahalal.

He was drafted into the IDF Armoured Corps in 1985, and graduated from the IAF Flight Academy course 113 as a fighter pilot in July 1987. After 4 months of flying Skyhawks during his advanced training, he joined the "Knights of the Twin Tail" Squadron in 1988 and became the youngest F-15 pilot in the world. In the early '90s, he flew the Kurnass 2000 variant of the F-4 Phantom II out of Hatzerim, and participated in bombing sorties during Operation Accountability. Later, Norkin was appointed first deputy squadron commander of the "Golden Eagle" Squadron and participated in Operation Grapes of Wrath. He next headed the IAF Operations Department. Between 1999 and 2002 Norkin was commander of the "Knights of the Twin Tail" Squadron. In 2003 he was chosen to integrate the IAF's new F-16I aircraft as commander of the "Negev" Squadron.

From 2009 to 2012, Norkin, now a brigadier general, commanded Tel Nof AFB, and was appointed head of the IAF Training & Doctrine Division in 2012. In August 2014, he was appointed IAF Chief of Air Staff until June 2015, when he was promoted to the rank of major general and was appointed head of the IDF Planning Directorate.

On August 10, 2017, Norkin was appointed Commander of the IAF, replacing Major General Amir Eshel.

Norkin completed his term as commander of the IAF on April 4, 2022. He was succeeded by Tomer Bar. He is the co-founder and managing partner at Ace Capital Partners, an Israeli aerospace and defense tech fund.

Norkin is married and has three daughters.

== Awards and decorations ==
- Israel:
  - Second Lebanon War
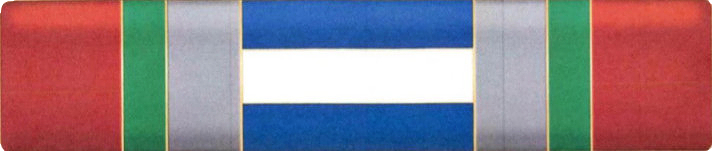
  - South Lebanon Security Zone
  - Operation Protective Edge
- Germany:
  - Commander of the Order of Merit of the Federal Republic of Germany (2021)
- United States:
  - Commander of the Legion of Merit (2019)
