= Amir Eshel =

Commander of the Israeli Air Force

- אמיר אשל
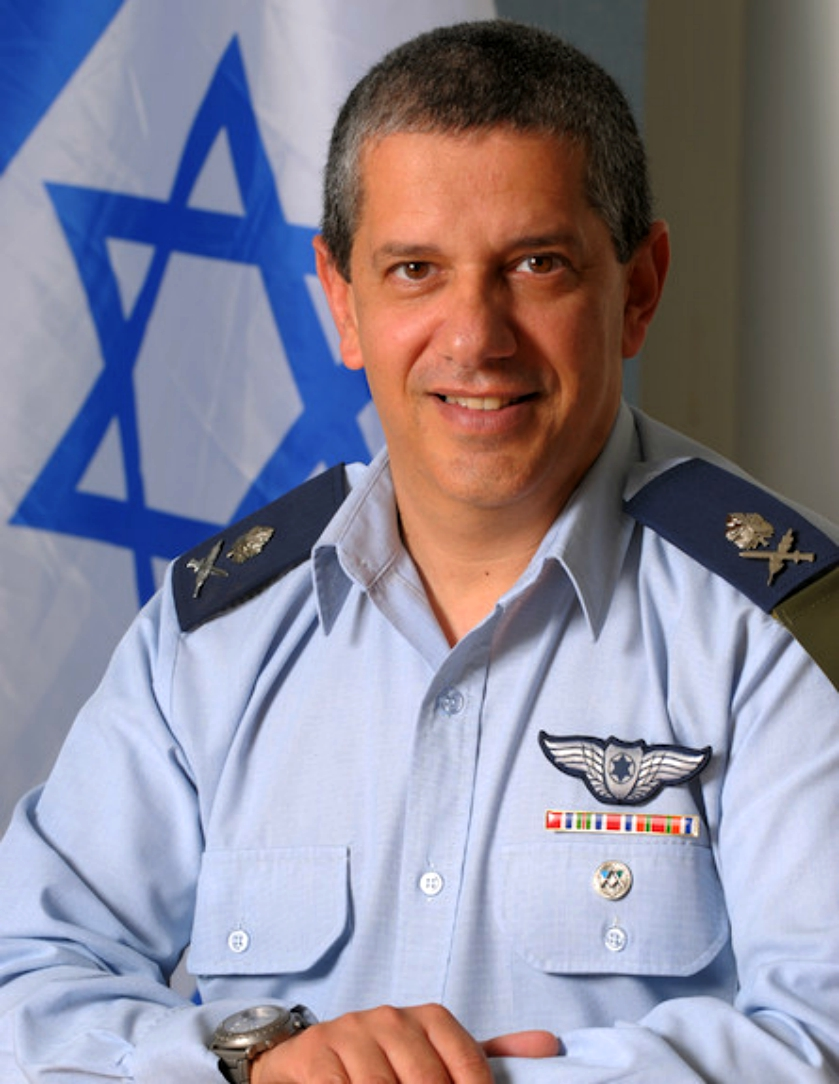
- Amir Eshel, 2015

17th Commander of the Israeli Air Force
- In office 10 May 2012 – 10 August 2017
- Prime Minister: Benjamin Netanyahu
- IDF Chief: Benny Gantz; Gadi Eizenkot
- Preceded by: Ido Nehoshtan
- Succeeded by: Amikam Norkin

Personal details
- Born: 1959 (age 66–67) Jaffa, Israel
- Education: Auburn University at Montgomery; University of Haifa

Military service
- Allegiance: Israel
- Branch/service: Israeli Air Force
- Years of service: 1977–2017
- Rank: Major General
- Commands: 201 Squadron; Ramon Airbase; Tel Nof Airbase; IAF Air Group; IAF Chief of Air Staff; IDF Planning Directorate; Israeli Air Force
- Battles/wars: 1982 Lebanon War; 2006 Lebanon War; 2008-2009 Gaza War; 2012 Operation Pillar of Defense; Operation Protective Edge

Amir Eshel (Hebrew: אמיר אשל; born 4 April 1959) is a former Israeli general who served as commander of the Israeli Air Force and served as Director General of the Israeli Ministry of Defense until January 2, 2022.

== Biography ==
Amir Eshel was born in Jaffa. His father Yehezekel (Hezi) Eshel (originally Batat), was born in Iraq and immigrated to Mandatory Palestine in 1936. He fought in the 1948 Arab-Israeli War in the Givati Brigade. His mother Edna was a Holocaust survivor from Russia.

Eshel is married and a father of three. He holds a degree in economics from Auburn University at Montgomery, Alabama, and a degree in political science from the University of Haifa’s National Security Studies Center.

== Air force career ==
Eshel was drafted into the IDF in 1977. After graduating from the IAF Flight Academy as a fighter pilot in 1979, Eshel flew the A-4 Skyhawk, first out of Etzion and then from Ramon. He also flew the Skyhawk during the 1982 Lebanon War. After serving with the flight academy as a combat instructor, Eshel went on to fly the F-16 out of Ramat David Airbase. Between 1993 and 1995 Eshel commanded 201 Squadron at Tel Nof. Flying the Kurnass 2000 variant of the F-4 Phantom II, Eshel led the squadron during Operation Grapes of Wrath. Between 1997 and 1999 Eshel headed the IAF's Operations Department.

In 1999 Eshel was assigned command of Ramon Airbase. On December 16, 1999, while ferrying an AH-64 Apache from Ramon to northern Israel, Eshel carried out a routine weapons systems check on the supposedly unarmed helicopter, accidentally firing an AGM-114 Hellfire which narrowly missed a group of IAF reserve soldiers nearby. The incident, for which he fined himself, was written up in his record, but did not prevent further promotion. In 1999 Eshel was assigned command of Tel Nof.

Eshel led a formation of three IAF F-15 Eagles on a fly-over of the Auschwitz concentration camp in September 2003. As it flew above the camp, Eshel broadcast a message to an IDF ceremony taking place below:

We pilots of the Air Force, flying in the skies above the camp of horrors, arose from the ashes of the millions of victims and shoulder their silent cries, salute their courage and promise to be the shield of the Jewish people and its nation Israel.

Eshel later explained that "We're talking about a personal dream of 15 years ... This is the most significant expression of the rebirth of this nation. As the IAF, we are the most concrete expression of the might of the Jewish people and there's no one better than us to express it". He also admitted that he deliberately violated an agreement with the Polish government by flying at a very low altitude. He was quoted saying to other pilots: "We listened to the Polish for 800 years. Today, we don’t have to listen anymore". The spokesman of Auschwitz-Birkenau Museum criticized the fly-over stating that it was not consulted with the Museum and that "It's a cemetery, a place of silence and concentration" and that "Flying the F-15s is a demonstration of military might which is an entirely inappropriate way to commemorate the victims". The Israeli delegation had been in Poland on the occasion of the Polish Air Force's 85th anniversary and had participated in the Radom Air Show.

In 2004 Eshel became head of the IAF's Air Group, commanding all operational assets and in January 2006 was appointed IAF Chief of Staff, a role he filled during the 2006 Lebanon War. Eshel was subsequently credited with the improvements to air-ground integration implemented after the war.

On March 27, 2008, he was promoted to the rank of Major General and appointed head of the IDF's Planning Directorate. He replaced Ido Nehoshtan, which had just been appointed Commander in Chief of the IAF. On February 5, 2012, Eshel was announced as Nehoshtan's successor as Commander in Chief of the Israeli Air Force, when the latter completed his tenure in May 2012. The other candidates were the Military Secretary to the Prime Minister, Maj. Gen. Yochanan Locker, and IAF Chief of Staff, Brig. Gen. Nimrod Sheffer.

Eshel completed his term as commander of the IAF on August 10, 2017. He was succeeded by Aluf Amikam Norkin. He received the U.S. Legion of Merit and Germany’s Bundeswehr Gold Cross of Honor.

== Public sector career ==
He was one of the leaders of Pnima, a campaign to institute universal national service for all Israeli citizens reaching adulthood. He told the Times of Israel that "[t]he IDF isn’t really a people’s army. It’s a half-of-the-people’s army."

On August 31, 2020, Eshel became Director General of the Israeli Ministry of Defense after being appointed to this position by the Minister of Defense Benny Gantz. Eshel is serving as a senior fellow the Foundation for Defense of Democracies.
