= Commander of the Israeli Air Force =

Highest-ranking officer of the Israeli Air Force

- מפקדי חיל האוויר
- Incumbent; Omer Tischler since 5 May 2026
- Israeli Air Force
- Reports to: Chief of the General Staff
- Formation: May 1948
- First holder: Yisrael Amir

The Commander of the Israeli Air Force (Hebrew: מפקד חיל האוויר) is the head and highest-ranking officer of the Israeli Air Force, responsible for its overall command and operations. The current commander is Omer Tischler.

== List of officeholders ==
| No. | Portrait | Name (birth–death) | Term of office | | | Ref. |
| No. | Portrait | Name (birth–death) | Took office | Left office | Time in office | Ref. |
|---|---|---|---|---|---|---|
| 1 | Yisrael Amir | Yisrael Amir (1902–2002) | May 1948 | July 1948 | 2 months | |
| 2 | Aharon Remez | Aharon Remez (1919–1994) | July 1948 | December 1950 | 2 years, 5 months | |
| 3 | Shlomo Shamir | Shlomo Shamir (1915–2009) | December 1950 | August 1951 | 8 months | |
| 4 | Haim Laskov | Haim Laskov (1919–1982) | August 1951 | May 1953 | 1 year, 9 months | |
| 5 | Dan Tolkowsky | Dan Tolkowsky (1921–2025) | May 1953 | July 1958 | 5 years, 2 months | |
| 6 | Ezer Weizman | Ezer Weizman (1924–2005) | July 1958 | April 1966 | 7 years, 9 months | |
| 7 | Mordechai Hod | Mordechai Hod (1926–2003) | April 1966 | May 1973 | 7 years, 1 month | |
| 8 | Benny Peled | Benny Peled (1928–2002) | May 1973 | October 1977 | 4 years, 5 months | |
| 9 | David Ivry | David Ivry (born 1934) | October 1977 | December 1982 | 5 years, 2 months | |
| 10 | Amos Lapidot | Amos Lapidot (1934–2019) | December 1982 | September 1987 | 4 years, 9 months | |
| 11 | Avihu Ben-Nun | Avihu Ben-Nun (born 1939) | September 1987 | January 1992 | 4 years, 4 months | |
| 12 | Herzl Bodinger | Herzl Bodinger (1943–2025) | January 1992 | July 1996 | 4 years, 6 months | |
| 13 | Eitan Ben Eliyahu | Eitan Ben Eliyahu (born 1944) | July 1996 | April 2000 | 3 years, 9 months | |
| 14 | Dan Halutz | Dan Halutz (born 1948) | April 2000 | April 2004 | 4 years | |
| 15 | Eliezer Shkedi | Eliezer Shkedi (born 1957) | April 2004 | May 2008 | 4 years, 1 month | |
| 16 | Ido Nehoshtan | Ido Nehoshtan (born 1957) | May 2008 | May 2012 | 4 years | |
| 17 | Amir Eshel | Amir Eshel (born 1959) | May 2012 | August 2017 | 5 years, 3 months | |
| 18 | Amikam Norkin | Amikam Norkin (born 1966) | August 2017 | April 2022 | 4 years, 8 months | |
| 19 | Tomer Bar | Tomer Bar (born 1969) | April 2022 | May 2026 | 4 years, 6 months | |
| 20 | Omer Tischler | Omer Tischler (born 1975) | May 2026 | | 5 months | |

== See also ==
- Commander of the Israeli Ground Forces
- Commander of the Navy (Israel)
