= Ido Nehoshtan =

Israeli Air Force general

- עידו נחושתן
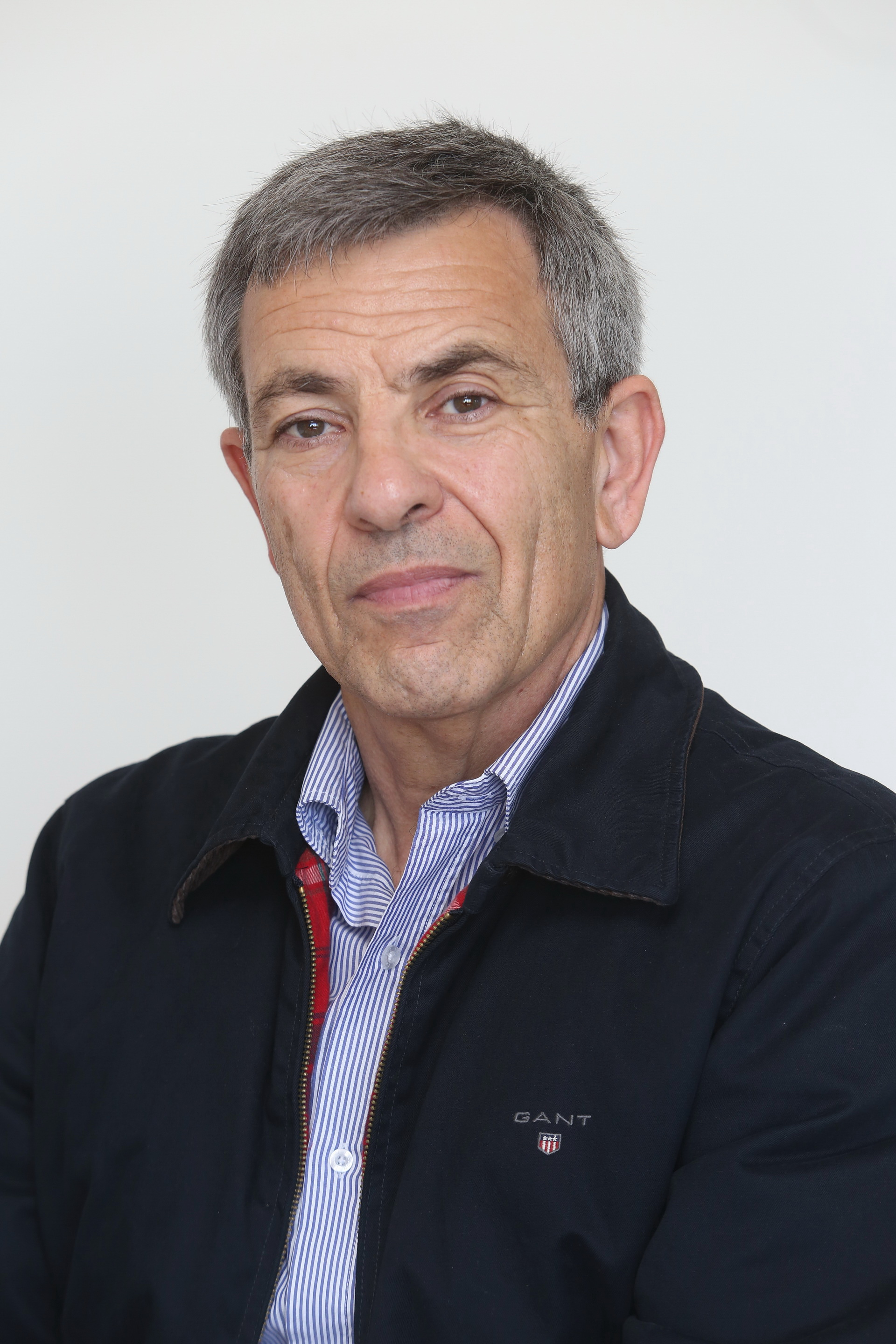

Commander of the Israeli Air Force
- In office 4 April 2008 – 10 May 2012
- Prime Minister: Ehud Olmert; Benjamin Netanyahu
- IDF Chief: Gabi Ashkenazi; Benny Gantz
- Preceded by: Eliezer Shkedi
- Succeeded by: Amir Eshel

Personal details
- Born: 1957 (age 68–69) Jerusalem
- Awards: Legion of Merit

Military service
- Allegiance: Israel
- Branch/service: Israeli Air Force
- Years of service: 1975–2012
- Rank: Major General
- Commands: 140 Squadron; Air Intelligence Group; IAF Chief of Staff; Planning Directorate; Israeli Air Force
- Battles/wars: 1982 Lebanon War; 2006 Lebanon War; 2008-2009 Gaza War

Aluf Ido Nehoshtan, also Nehushtan (Hebrew: עידו נחושתן; born 1957) is a retired general in the Israel Defense Forces. He replaced Eliezer Shkedi on 4 April 2008 as Air Force Commander until he himself was replaced by Amir Eshel on 10 May 2012 upon his retirement from 37 years of service. He is currently serving as the president of Boeing Israel.

== Military career ==
The son of Ya'akov Nehoshtan, Nehoshtan's roots are from Bulgaria and North Macedonia. Nehoshtan was conscripted into the Israel Defense Forces in 1975 in the Combat Engineering branch and was selected for the IAF Pilots Course after a year of service. Until 1979, he flew an A-4 Skyhawk, and was then re-trained for the F-4 Phantom in the No. 107 Squadron.

During his career, Nehoshtan served as an instructor at the pilot school, then as the 253 Squadron deputy commander (ranked major) and commander of the No. 140 Squadron (ranked lieutenant colonel), among others.

In 2000, he was promoted to the rank of brigadier general and commanded the Air Intelligence Command, from 2002 commanded the Air Command, and in 2004 he became the Chief of Staff of the Air Force.

On June 8, 2006, he was appointed to the command of the Planning Directorate in the IDF and promoted to the rank of Major General with the consent of the Defense Minister Amir Peretz, in response to a request by Chief of Staff Dan Halutz to keep him in service. On February 15, 2008, Defense Minister Ehud Barak and Chief of Staff Gabi Ashkenazi approved Nehoshtan's appointment to command the Air Force as a Major General. On April 4, 2008, he was replaced by Amir Eshel as the Planning Directorate head upon becoming Air Force Commander. Eshel succeeded Nehoshtan as Air Force Commander four years later.

In April 2012, he was awarded the Legion of Merit by US Air Force Commander Gen. Norton Schwartz during a ceremony in Washington. Nehoshtan also met with US pilots who had flown the F-35 Joint Strike Fighter, and had flight sessions in the aircraft's simulator, as well as on the V-22 Osprey tilt-rotor aircraft that the IAF had been considering acquiring as a complementary platform for search and rescue, and covert operations behind enemy lines.

In September 2021, he was appointed as the president of Boeing Israel, succeeding David Ivry.
