= Omer Tischler =

Israeli general (born 1975)

- עומר טישלר
- Tischler receiving command, May 2026

Commander of the Israeli Air Force
- Incumbent
- Assumed office 5 May 2026
- Prime Minister: Benjamin Netanyahu
- IDF Chief: Eyal Zamir
- Preceded by: Tomer Bar

Personal details
- Born: 1975 (age 50–51) Karmiel, Israel

Military service
- Allegiance: Israel
- Branch/service: Israeli Air Force
- Years of service: 1993–present
- Rank: Aluf
- Commands: 140 Squadron; 119 Squadron; Air Force Operations Department; Israeli Air Force Flight Academy; Nevatim Airbase; IAF Chief of Air Staff; Israeli Air Force
- Battles/wars: Security Zone in Lebanon Campaign; Second Intifada; Operation Defensive Shield; Second Lebanon War; Operation Cast Lead; Operation Pillar of Defense; Operation Brother's Keeper; Operation Protective Edge; Operation Swords of Iron; 2026 Israeli–United States strikes on Iran

Omer Tischler (Hebrew: עומר טישלר; born 1975) is an Israeli general currently commanding the Israeli Air Force.

== Biography ==
Tischler in 2021 as the commander of Nevatim Airbase

Omer Tischler was born in 1975 in Karmiel and raised in Kfar Saba. After graduating from Ostrovski high school, he was drafted into the Israel Defense Forces and joined the Israeli Air Force in 1993. He graduated from the Israeli Air Force Flight Academy in 1995. He was trained as a F-16 pilot, but shortly thereafter became a member of the founding group of the re-formed 69 Squadron that flies F-15Is.

In 2002 Tischler began studying Biomedical engineering at Tel Aviv University and earned a bachelor's degree, after which he left active service for the private sector. Tischler participated in the Second Lebanon War in 2006 as a reservist. After the war he returned to active service in the Israeli Air Force and was appointed second in command of 105 Squadron, flying F-16Ds.

In 2011 Tischler was appointed commander of 140 Squadron, and in 2013 he took command of 119 Squadron. In 2017 he was appointed as commander of the Israeli Air Force Flight Academy.

In July 2019 Tischler was made commander of Nevatim Airbase. In September 2021 he was appointed to head the Air Operations Group. In September 2023 he was made IAF Chief of Staff.

In December 2025 Israeli Minister of Defense Israel Katz approved the appointment of Tischler as the next Commander of the Israeli Air Force.

In May 2026 he assumed responsibility as Commander of the Israeli Air Force, replacing Tomer Bar.

== Awards and decorations ==
Omer Tischler was awarded three campaign ribbons for his service during three conflicts.

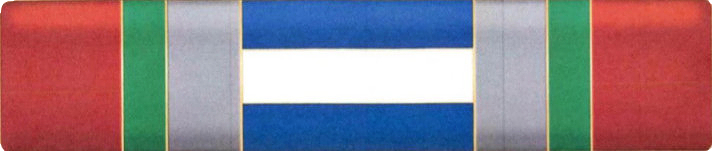

Second Lebanon War	South Lebanon Security Zone	Operation Protective Edge
