= Tomer Bar =

Israeli general (born 1969)

- תומר בר
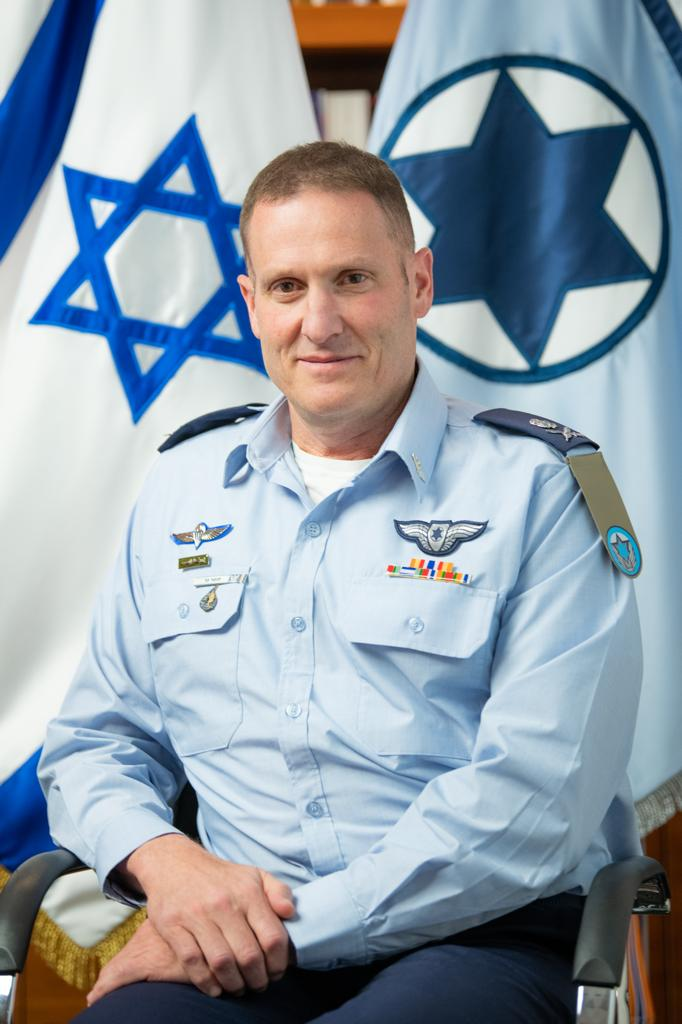
- Official portrait, 2022

Commander of the Israeli Air Force
- In office 4 April 2022 – 5 May 2026
- Prime Minister: Naftali Bennett; Yair Lapid; Benjamin Netanyahu
- IDF Chief: Aviv Kochavi; Herzi Halevi; Eyal Zamir
- Preceded by: Amikam Norkin
- Succeeded by: Omer Tischler

Personal details
- Born: 11 June 1969 (age 57) Kfar Yehoshua, Israel

Military service
- Allegiance: Israel
- Branch/service: Israeli Air Force
- Years of service: 1987–2026
- Rank: Aluf
- Commands: 133 Squadron; 69 Squadron; Tel Nof Airbase; Air Force Operations Department; Israeli Air Force Flight Academy; Tel Nof Airbase; IAF Chief of Air Staff; IDF Force Design Directorate; Israeli Air Force
- Battles/wars: Security Zone in Lebanon Campaign; Second Intifada; Operation Defensive Shield; Second Lebanon War; Operation Cast Lead; Operation Pillar of Defense; Operation Brother's Keeper; Operation Protective Edge; Operation Swords of Iron; 2026 Israeli–United States strikes on Iran

Tomer Bar (Hebrew: תומר בר; born 11 June 1969) is an Israeli general who served as Commander of the Israeli Air Force. Before his selection to succeed Amikam Norkin as commander of the IAF, Bar served as head of the IDF Force Design Directorate, a reorganized version of what was once the Planning Directorate.

== Biography ==
Bar was born on 11 June 1969 to Jewish parents and is one of six children of Erela and Natan Bar. He enlisted in the IDF in 1987 and completed the pilot course with honors in 1989.

He served as a F-16 fighter pilot with the 110, 116 and 140 Squadrons. After a period of study in the United States, he was assigned as an F-15 pilot with the 133 Squadron in 1998.

From 1999 to 2002, he served as head of the Operations Branch at the Air Force Headquarters. In 2005, Bar was appointed commander of the 69 Squadron, which was equipped with the F-15I, and commanded the squadron during the Second Lebanon War. During his tenure, the squadron have undertaken Operation Orchard, the destruction of a Syrian nuclear site on 6 September 2007. During his service, he served as head of the Air Force's Operations Department for three years, including during Operation Cast Lead. In 2010, he was appointed commander of the Israeli Air Force Flight Academy, and served in that position until 2012.

In February 2012, he was promoted to the rank of brigadier general and appointed commander of the Tel Nof Airbase, where he took part in the training of UAV operators and commanded the base during Operation Pillar of Cloud. On 17 October 2017, he was appointed chief of staff of the Air Force, and served in that position until 22 October 2019, including during the February 2018 Israel–Syria incident. On 18 June 2020, he was promoted to major general, and was appointed head of the IDF Force Design Directorate on 21 June.

In September 2021, he was announced as the next appointee of commander of the IAF and on 4 April 2022, Bar was appointed commander of the IAF, replacing Major General Amikam Norkin.

Throughout 2023, he faced the challenge of Air Force reservist pilots refusing to serve in protest as part of their involvement in the 2023 Israeli judicial reform protests. In July 2023, in response to attacks by right-wing politicians and activists against the IDF during the protests, he stated that "the harsh statements said against the IDF and the Air Force, both mandatory service and reserves in recent days, there is no place in our society for such statements, and they are desecrating and are causing great damage to the cohesion of our forces." On 3 October 2023, Bar issued an ultimatum to pilots protesting judicial reform who were refusing to serve that they return to service by 17 October or risk being removed from the Air Force.

On 7 October 2023, militant group Hamas launched a surprise attack on Israel, resulting in the deaths of hundreds of Israeli soldiers and civilians. The Air Force, under Bar's command, took part in operations to contain the terrorists who infiltrated Israel during the attack. It also carried out intensive strikes in the Gaza Strip and Lebanon during the Gaza war and played a significant role in countering the Iranian strikes against Israel in April 2024. On several occasions during the war, he personally participated in combat sorties.

Bar served as commander of the IAF during the Twelve-Day War with Iran in June 2025 and during 2026 Iran war. On May 2026 he was replaced by Omer Tischler as Commander of the Israeli Air Force.

== Awards and decorations ==
Tomer Bar was awarded three campaign ribbons for his service during three conflicts.

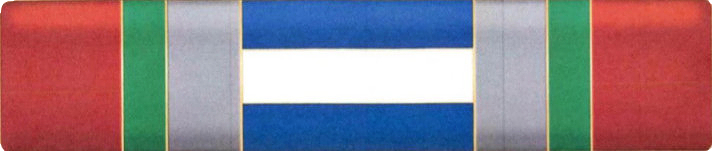

Second Lebanon War	South Lebanon Security Zone	Operation Protective Edge
