= Hezi Eshel =

Israeli soldier

Yechezkel "Hezi" Eshel
- חזי אשל
- Born: January 4, 1931; Baghdad, Iraq
- Died: November 28, 2016 (aged 85); Kiryat Ono, Israel
- Military career
- Allegiance: Israel
- Service years: 1947–1980
- Rank: Sgan Aluf
- Nickname: Hezi
- Units: Givati, Golani
- Commands: Golani Training Base commander Military Chief of Kiryat Shemona; Chief of the Lakhish District; Chief of Jenin Governorate
- Conflicts: 1947–1949 Palestine war Operation Kadesh; Six-Day War; Yom Kippur War

Yechezkel "Hezi" Eshel (Hebrew: חזי אשל; January 4, 1931 – November 28, 2016) was a lieutenant colonel in the Israel Defense Forces who served in command duties in the Givati and Golani brigades, as well as in administrative duties in the IDF headquarters ("Matkal").

== Biography ==
Eshel was born Yechezkel Batat in Baghdad, Iraq. He immigrated with his family to Israel in 1936.

== Military career ==
At age 16 he joined the Suburban Hish, where he was sent to man defence posts in Tel Aviv and Hartuv. Following the November 1947 UN Partition Resolution, when he was still under 17 years of age, he joined the Haganah, and was assigned to the Givati (1948) brigade, at the very day that it was established. He was positioned in the 53rd Battalion, commanded by Yitzhak Pundak. During the 1947–1949 Palestine war he took part with this unit in dozens of operations, including the battle of Khartia, Operation Death to the Invader, seizing of the village Al-Maghar, and many more. In Khartia the battalion suffered counterattacks by the Egyptian army, and Eshel demonstrated his courage when he ran back and forth, under enemy fire, to replenish ammunition at the posts. He was praised after the war by his company commander.

After the war he was transferred to the Air Force, and was sent to the Officers Academy. As a young officer, he was nominated to establish the Reserve Duty force of the 4th Wing at the Hatzor Airbase. In 1954 he returned to the Infantry Corps, and became a platoon commander in the 51st battalion of Givati. In Operation Kadesh he was in charge of a line of outposts on the Egyptian border, and his unit cleared the way to the town Rafah. After the operation he was nominated as the commander of unit 150 on the border. He served as Chief of the Office at the Southern Command, under Major Generals Haim Laskov and Chaim Herzog. He was a trainer at the Army Officers Academy ("Bahad 1"), and then commanded a company in the 12th battalion ("Barak") of the Golani brigade.

In 1965 he graduated from the multi-force academy of Command and administration ("Poom"), after which he was the head of training programs in the Training Department of the IDF headquarters.

At the break of the Six-Day War he was commander of the Golani training base. In the war he commanded a team which took part in the battles in the northern west bank, and Tel Faher in the Golan Heights. After the war he was chief training officer of the Northern Command. In 1970 he became the military chief of the frontier town Kiryat Shmona. The town was bombarded at the time with Katyusha rockets from the Lebanon area. In this semi-military duty, Eshel established good working relations with the locals and with officials of the municipality. At the beginning of 1973 he moved to the Planning Directorate, to head the national security section, which was responsible for preparing the country's economic system for emergencies, and for the interface with the civilian Emergency Supply Department. Upon the break of the Yom Kippur War he headed back north to Kiryat Shmona, which was again attacked by rockets, and helped organize the civilian defence forces.

In 1975 he became chief of the Lakhish District as part of the Home Front. Later on he served as chief of Jenin Governorate in the occupied West Bank. He retired from the military in 1980.

== Family ==
Hezi Eshel is married to Edna (of Alon-Alperovich family), a Tel-Aviv native, whose greater family was killed in The Holocaust. They have four children: Amir, Michal, Merav and Na'ama. His eldest son Amir Eshel is the commander in chief of the Israeli Air Force. As a descendant of a holocaust survivor, in 1993 Amir Eshel led a formation of F-15 fighters on a fly-over of the Auschwitz death camp.
