= Avihu Ben-Nun =

Israeli Air Force general

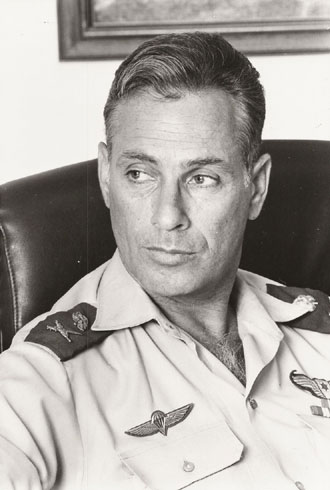
- Native name: אביהו בן-נון
- Born: 24 December 1939 (age 86); Givat Ada
- Allegiance: Israel
- Service years: 1957–1992
- Rank: Aluf
- Commands: 116 Squadron, 69 Squadron, IDF Planning Directorate, Israeli Air Force
- Conflicts: Six-Day War; War of Attrition; Yom Kippur War; 1982 Lebanon War; South Lebanon conflict First Intifada

Avihu Ben-Nun (Hebrew: אביהו בן-נון; born 24 December 1939) is a retired Israeli general who was the 11th commander of the Israeli Air Force between 1987 and 1992.

== Biography ==
Ben-Nun enlisted in the Israeli Air Force in 1957 and became a fighter pilot. In 1963 he began flying the Dassault Mirage III, yet on the eve of the Six-Day War became deputy commander of 116 "Defenders of the South" squadron, flying Dassault Mysteres. He assumed temporary command of the squadron after its commander was forced to eject early in the war. After the war he was assigned to 119 Squadron, which at the time was based at Tel Nof Airbase. In July 1967 Ben-Nun shot down an Egyptian MiG-21 over the Suez Canal, and another in October 1967.

In March 1969 Ben-Nun was one of the first airmen assigned to fly the F-4 Phantom II. In September 1969 he became commander of 69 Squadron, which he commanded throughout the War of Attrition. In the course of the war, Ben-Nun led the Phantom contingent that participated in operation Rimon 20 and shot down a Russian MiG-21 operating from Egypt. On September 9, 1972, a month after handing command of 69 Squadron to Amnon Arad, Ben-Nun and navigator Zvi Kesler shot down a Syrian Sukhoi Su-7. During the Yom Kippur War Ben-Nun was in charge of the Air Force's offensive operations command, yet flew eight operational sorties with his former squadron.

In 1975 Ben-Nun was put in charge of Tactical Operations in the Israeli Air Force's Headquarters. Between 1977 and 1982 he commanded Hatzor Airbase and Tel Nof Airbase. In 1982 Ben-Nun headed the Operations Department of the Israeli Air Force. In 1983 he was put in charge of building operations within the IAF. In 1985 headed the IDF's Planning Directorate, and was promoted to the rank of Aluf. In September 1987 he became Commander of the Israeli Air Force, replacing Amos Lapidot.

Under his aegis the IAF begun operating the AH-64 Apache and took delivery of additional F-16 Fighting Falcons. At the same time, the IAF carried out 500 operations against terrorist groups based in Lebanon. In 1992 Ben-Nun handed command of the Israeli Air Force over to Herzl Bodinger, resigning from the IDF.

In 1995 Ben-Nun was diagnosed with Parkinson's disease.

== Bibliography ==
- Aloni, Shlomo; Avidror, Zvi (2010). Hammers - Israel's Long-Range Heavy Bomber Arm: The Story of 69 Squadron. Atglen, PA: Schiffer Publishing. ISBN 978-0-7643-3655-3.
