= Heroes for Life =

- לוחמים ללא גבולות
- Abbreviation: HFL
- Formation: 2013
- Type: Non-profit organization
- Legal status: Non-governmental organization
- Purpose: Education and humanitarian aid
- Headquarters: Petah Tikvah
- Location: Israel
- Services: Education, disaster relief and humanitarian aid
- Chairman: Eliezer Shkedi
- Website: hfl.org.il/en/

Heroes for Life (in Hebrew: לוחמים ללא גבולות warriors without borders) is a non-governmental organization founded in 2013 by three officers of the Israel Defense Forces (IDF) who had served in the Duvdevan unit for eight years. They started a trip after performing military service together, a trip that the IDF soldiers normally perform after completing the military service.

== History of the group ==
On the day of the Jewish New Year (Rosh HaShanah), Gili, one of the three friends, stayed in a house that belonged to the Chabad Lubavitch Chassidic movement, which was located on the island of Ko Samui, in the Kingdom of Thailand, together with more than 1,500 Israeli tourists. Gili was amazed to see the tremendous number of Israeli backpackers who traveled to poor countries every year, and that was when the idea was born of using this valuable human resource to make the world a better place.

Heroes for Life was founded in 2013 by three officers from the Duvdevan unit who, while traveling through the Far East, encountered that many Israelis visited third world countries, and they realized the potential to use that human resource to present the nation of Israel. in a positive way through the volunteer work. The organization is chaired by the former commander of the Air Force General Eliezer Shkedi. The only condition to join a delegation of Heroes for Life is to volunteer first with the organization in a youth village in Israel for three days. The team is called "Danielle" in honor of Danielle Sonnenfeld, a national service volunteer who worked with children with cancer at the Schneider Medical Center, and who died in a traffic accident three years ago. The founder of the organization is named Gili Cohen. In addition to Brazil, there are delegations that go every year to countries such as: India, Nepal, South Africa, Guatemala, Mexico, Argentina and Ethiopia.

== Activities of the group by country ==
=== Africa ===
==== Ethiopia ====
In March 2017, Heroes for life expanded its voluntary activity to the nation of Ethiopia. The first delegation went there in March, and stayed in the country two weeks. In that expedition, the volunteers worked with kids. The activities included the teaching of English, mathematics, dental health, and music. They also participate in the renovation of a shelter that was located near the city of Gondar, in the northern region of Ethiopia. Besides the program of the volunteers, the delegation also counted with a dentist that provided dental care for the children of the shelter, that needed medical assistance. The expedition counted with the cooperation of a local Ethiopian NGO, and also the collaboration of the Israeli NGO Eden.

==== South Africa ====
In March 2018, the backpackers arrived in South Africa and stayed there two weeks to perform humanitarian work and educational activities with the poor children of the city. The volunteers taught them arithmetic, music and English. The backpackers contributed to the renovation and improvement of the living conditions of the children, collaborating in agricultural projects and painting residential buildings. In addition to working with the children of the neighborhood, the weekends are dedicated to volunteer work with the South African Jewish community.

=== America ===
==== Argentina ====
Every year in December, the backpacker volunteers organize an expedition to the neighborhood of San Fernando in Buenos Aires, Argentina. The mission of the volunteers last two weeks, and during that period of time they are concentrated in performing several educational activities with the kids of the neighbourhood. Every expedition is formed by a group that has between 20 and 25 volunteers. The work of the volunteers is divided in to teams, the shift of the morning is dedicated mainly to carry out several projects of painting and restoration, that are designed and executed by the backpacker volunteers (for instance: the delegation of the year 2015 built a dining room for the children of the neighbourhood) in second place, the shift of the afternoon is dedicated to teach the kids several themes like: English, mathematics, music, personal values, and dental care. One of the principles of the group is the continuity of work made by every delegation, each expedition works with the same kids than the previous delegations, creating a beautiful and valuable link with the local population. The volunteer missions in the Argentinian Republic, started in the year 2015, with the coming into the country of the team Oz, and in 2017 it was the third time that the project had place in the quarter. Besides the activities performed with the kids of the neighbourhood during the week, the weekends are dedicated to strengthen the bons with the local Jewish community in Argentina. This activity has place together with the Maccabi movement in Argentina, and is directed to the youth of the Jewish community of Buenos Aires. The name of the team Oz, is dedicated to the memory of the sergeant Oz Mendelovic, who died in the Gaza Strip during the military operation, Protective Edge.

==== Brazil ====
25 Israeli backpackers on their trip after the army, most of them veterans of the IDF combat units, decided to volunteer in the favelas of Rio de Janeiro, Brazil, and teach local children English and mathematics and renovate the community institutions as part of the Heroes for Life program. One of the volunteers, Lior Tabib, is a former Israeli Air Force officer who lost his friend, the captain Tal Nachman in 2014 in Gaza. The two had planned to travel together through South America, and Lior decided to join the delegation in memory of his friend. Captain Nachman was killed in a fire during operations at the Gaza border four years ago, when a soldier from the Givati reconnaissance battalion accidentally shot him after mistaking him for a terrorist. At the beginning, Lior and his colleagues worked in the favela of Cantagalo, and recently moved to another location in a community center in the neighborhood of Pavuna, which is on the outskirts of the city and surrounded by favelas. Every day, Lior and his friends teach classes in different subjects for local children with the help of members of the Jewish community in the city, who serve as interpreters. The volunteers are also helping to renovate the community center in the neighborhood.

==== Guatemala ====
In September 2018, the NGO will expand its volunteer activity to the nation of Guatemala. The first delegation will travel there in September 2018 and the mission will last two weeks. In this expedition, the volunteers will work with children. The activities will include the teaching of English and mathematics, dental health and music. They will also participate in the renovation of a shelter that is located near Guatemala City.

==== Mexico ====
In September 2018, the organization will expand its voluntary activity to the nation of Mexico. The first delegation will go to Mexico in September 2018, and the mission will last two weeks. In this expedition, the volunteers will work with children. The activities will include teaching English and mathematics, personal hygiene, and music. They will also participate in the renovation of a shelter located near Mexico City.

=== Asia ===
==== India ====
Every year in September, the expedition of the Israeli backpackers travels to Mumbai, in India. The work of the volunteers lasts two weeks and is dedicated to several activities such as teaching English, mathematics, music and dental care. In second place, the activities are carried out to renew and improve the living conditions of the children, as well as various agricultural projects, buildings and residential structures are painted. The expeditions of the volunteers to India began in 2014. One of the principles of the organization is the continuity, for that reason each delegation works with the same children as the previous expeditions. In addition to the activities with the children in the suburbs of the neighborhood during the week, the weekends are dedicated to volunteer work with the local Jewish community. The purpose of these activities is to strengthen the connection with these communities through cultural exchange, in this way the volunteers learn about the way of life of the community and enjoy the flavors and colors of India. The name of the expedition is Danielle, in memory of the IDF sergeant Danielle Pomerantz, who died during the military operation "protective edge", which took place in the Gaza Strip.

==== Nepal ====
In October 2017, the organization expanded its volunteer activities to the nation of Nepal. The first delegation departed there in October and remained two weeks in the country. On that expedition, the volunteers worked with the children. The activities included teaching the kids; English, mathematics, dental care, and music. They also participated in the renovation of the residential shelter, located near the city of Kathmandu.
