= Kfar Yehoshua =

Moshav in northern Israel, between Haifa and Nazareth

Kfar Yehoshua: כְּפַר יְהוֹשֻׁעַ (Hebrew)
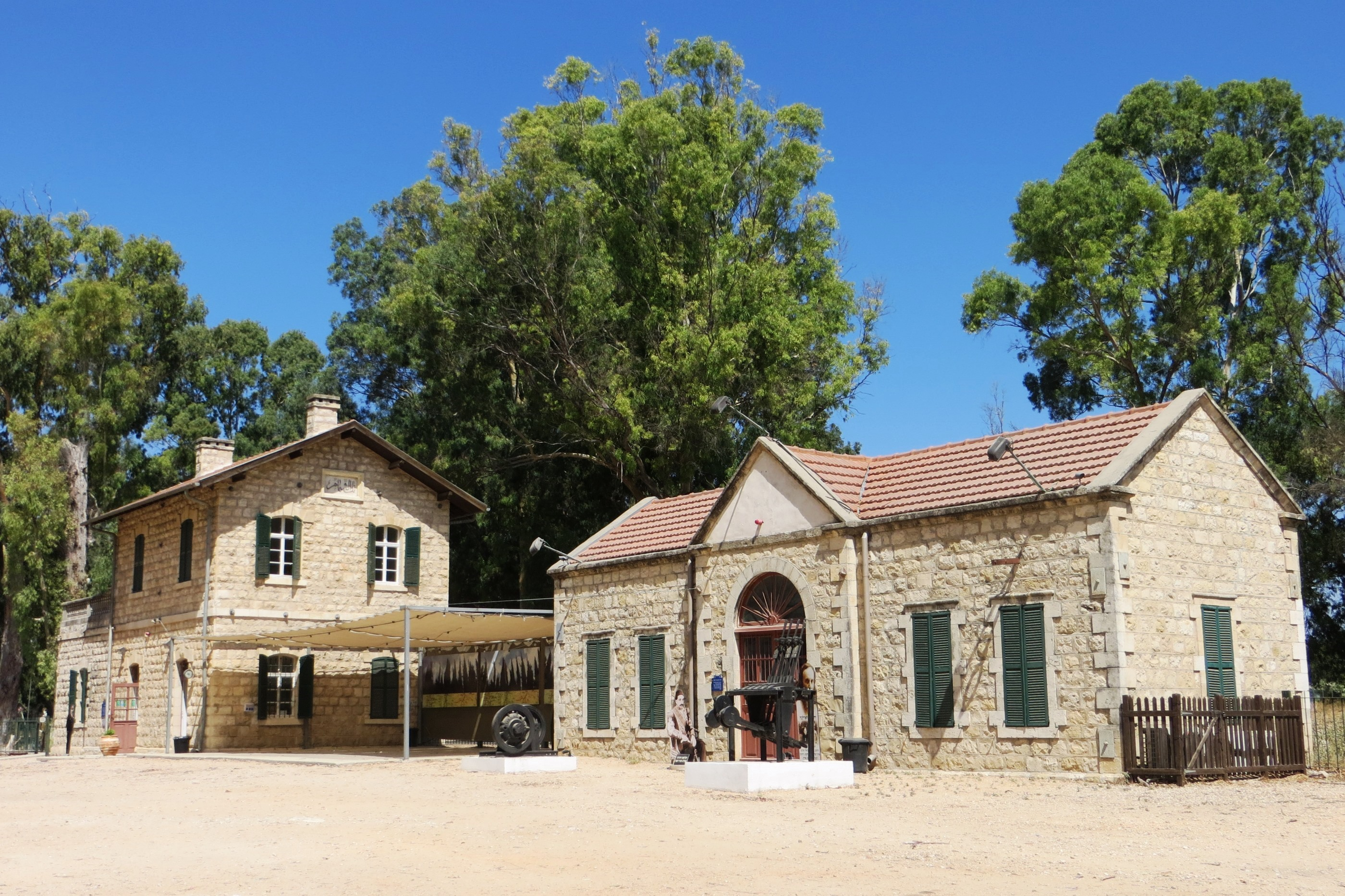
- Etymology: Joshua Village
- Location within Jezreel Valley region of Israel
- Coordinates: 32°41′1″N 35°9′14″E
- Country: Israel
- District: Northern
- Subdistrict: Jezreel
- Council: Jezreel Valley
- Affiliation: Moshavim Movement
- Founded: 1927
- Population (2024): 1,220

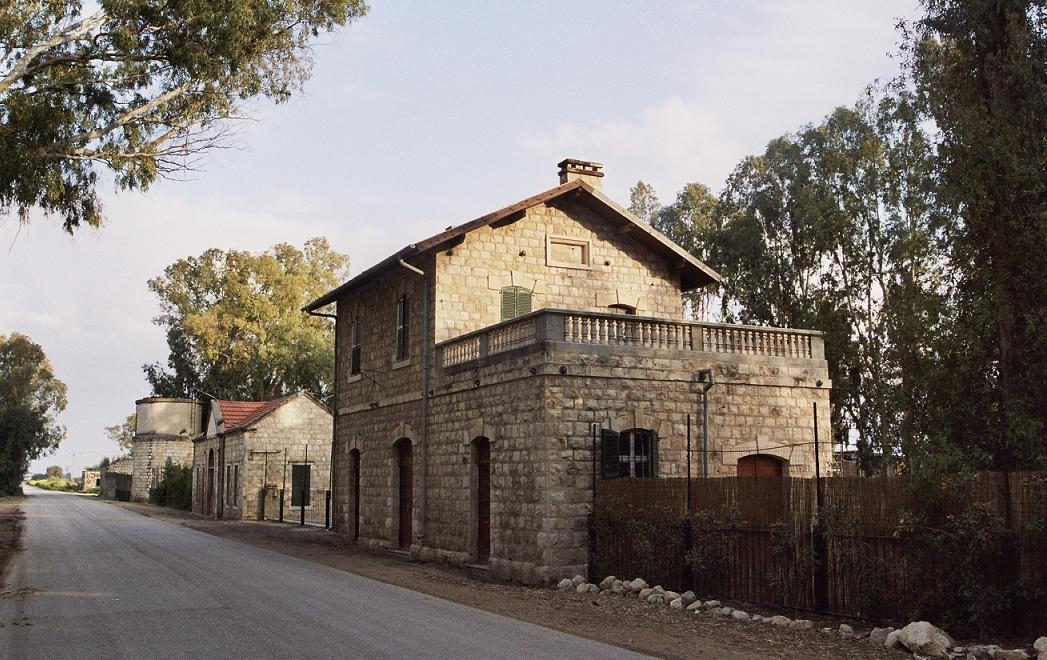
Historic Kfar Yehoshua Railway Station, 2006

Kfar Yehoshua (Hebrew: כְּפַר יְהוֹשֻׁעַ, lit. 'Joshua's Village') is a moshav in northern Israel. Located between Haifa and Nazareth, it falls under the jurisdiction of Jezreel Valley Regional Council. In 2024 it had a population of 1,220.

== History ==
=== Ottoman era ===
Near the village there is an archaeological site called Tell esh Shemmâm. During Ottoman era a Muslim village was found there. The meaning of the name is "Mound of the Melon/Colocynth". Moshe Dayan mentioned it as an example of "there is not one place built in this country which did not have a former Arab population".

In 1881, the PEF's Survey of Western Palestine (SWP) described Tel esh Shemmam as a small artificial mound.

=== British Mandate era ===
In the 1922 census of Palestine conducted by the British authorities, Tal al-Shammam had 71 inhabitants; 70 Muslims and 1 Melkite Christian. A nearby swamp called el-Matba'ah was believed to provide relief from rheumatism, nervous pains, and sterility.

The area was acquired by the Jewish community as part of the Sursock Purchase. The moshav was founded in 1927, based on an agreement reached in 1923 at a Histadrut committee meeting in Nahalal. In 1924, during the Shavuot holidays, the council met in order to clarify the ideological goal of combining the idea of the kibbutz and the moshav. In 1924, a contract for the purchase of land in the western Jezreel Valley was signed under the auspices of Yehoshua Hankin. A tract of 8,000 dunams was purchased for 25,000 Egyptian pounds from the heirs of the Twsiny family (partners of the Sursocks). The village at the time was the home of 50 families. In January 1927, the committee voted to name the village for Hankin. On March 3, 1927, the wooden hut of the former tenants of the railway station in Tel Shamam was brought to the hill of the village and the first families took up residence there.

Kfar Yehoshua was one of 140 agricultural settlements designed by the German-Jewish architect Richard Kauffmann.

In the 1931 census Kfar Yehoshua had a population of 277; 32 Muslim and 245 Jews, in a total of 53 inhabited houses. In the 1945 statistics, the population was 620, all Jewish.

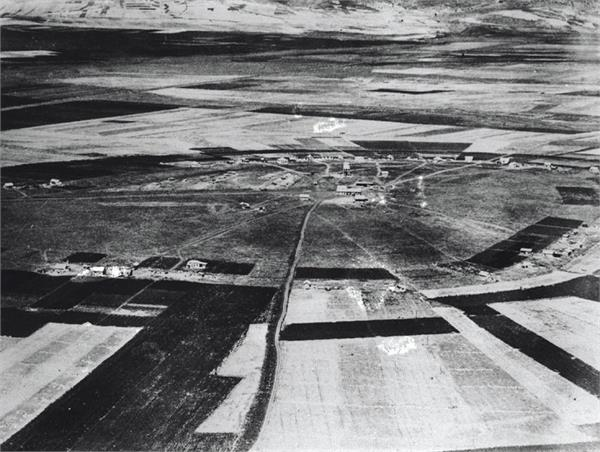
Kfar Yehoshus 1929

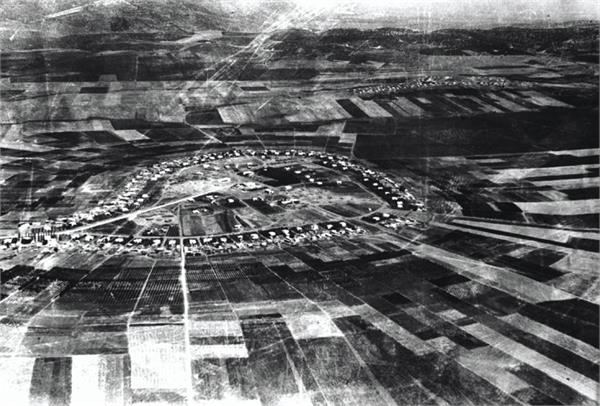
Kfar Yehoshua 1939

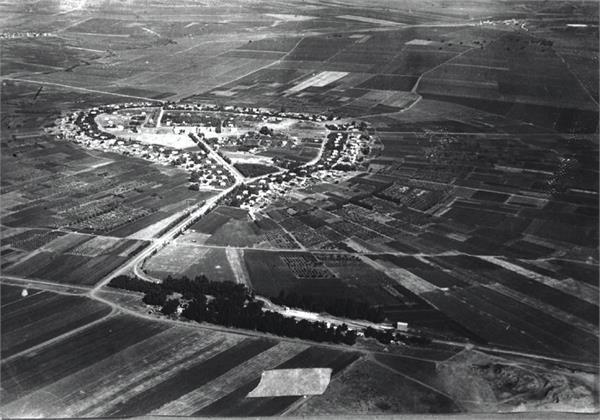
Kfar Yehoshua 1946 station in foreground

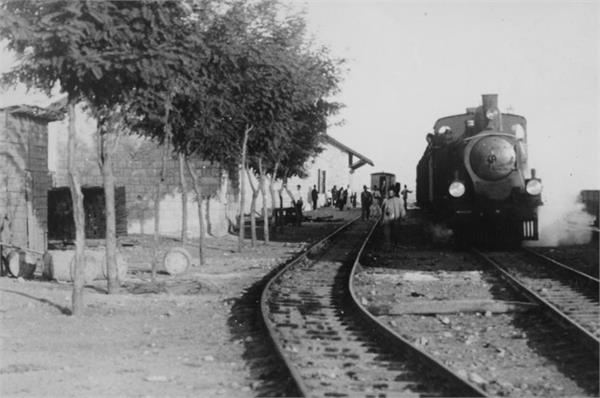
Kfar Yehoshua railway station 1930

== Landmarks ==
A train station in Kfar Yehoshua operated for close to fifty years on the Jezreel Valley Railway, from the beginning of the 20th century to 1948. Seven stone buildings from this period have been restored by the Society for Preservation of Israel Heritage Sites, and original railroad tracks have been returned to the site.

== Notable people ==
- Gabi Gazit
- Tomer Bar

== Bibliography ==
- Barron, J.B., ed. (1923). Palestine: Report and General Abstracts of the Census of 1922. Government of Palestine.
- Conder, C.R.; Kitchener, H.H. (1881). The Survey of Western Palestine: Memoirs of the Topography, Orography, Hydrography, and Archaeology. Vol. 1. London: Committee of the Palestine Exploration Fund.
- Department of Statistics (1945). Village Statistics, April, 1945. Government of Palestine.
- Hadawi, S. (1970). Village Statistics of 1945: A Classification of Land and Area ownership in Palestine. Palestine Liberation Organization Research Center. Archived from the original on 2018-12-08. (p.49 Archived 2015-09-24 at the Wayback Machine)
- Mills, E., ed. (1932). Census of Palestine 1931. Population of Villages, Towns and Administrative Areas. Jerusalem: Government of Palestine.
- Palmer, E.H. (1881). The Survey of Western Palestine: Arabic and English Name Lists Collected During the Survey by Lieutenants Conder and Kitchener, R. E. Transliterated and Explained by E.H. Palmer. Committee of the Palestine Exploration Fund.
- Rogan, E.; Shlaim, A. (2001). The War for Palestine: Rewriting the History of 1948. Cambridge University Press. ISBN 0-521-79476-5.
