= Gabi Gazit =

Israeli journalist

- גבי גזית
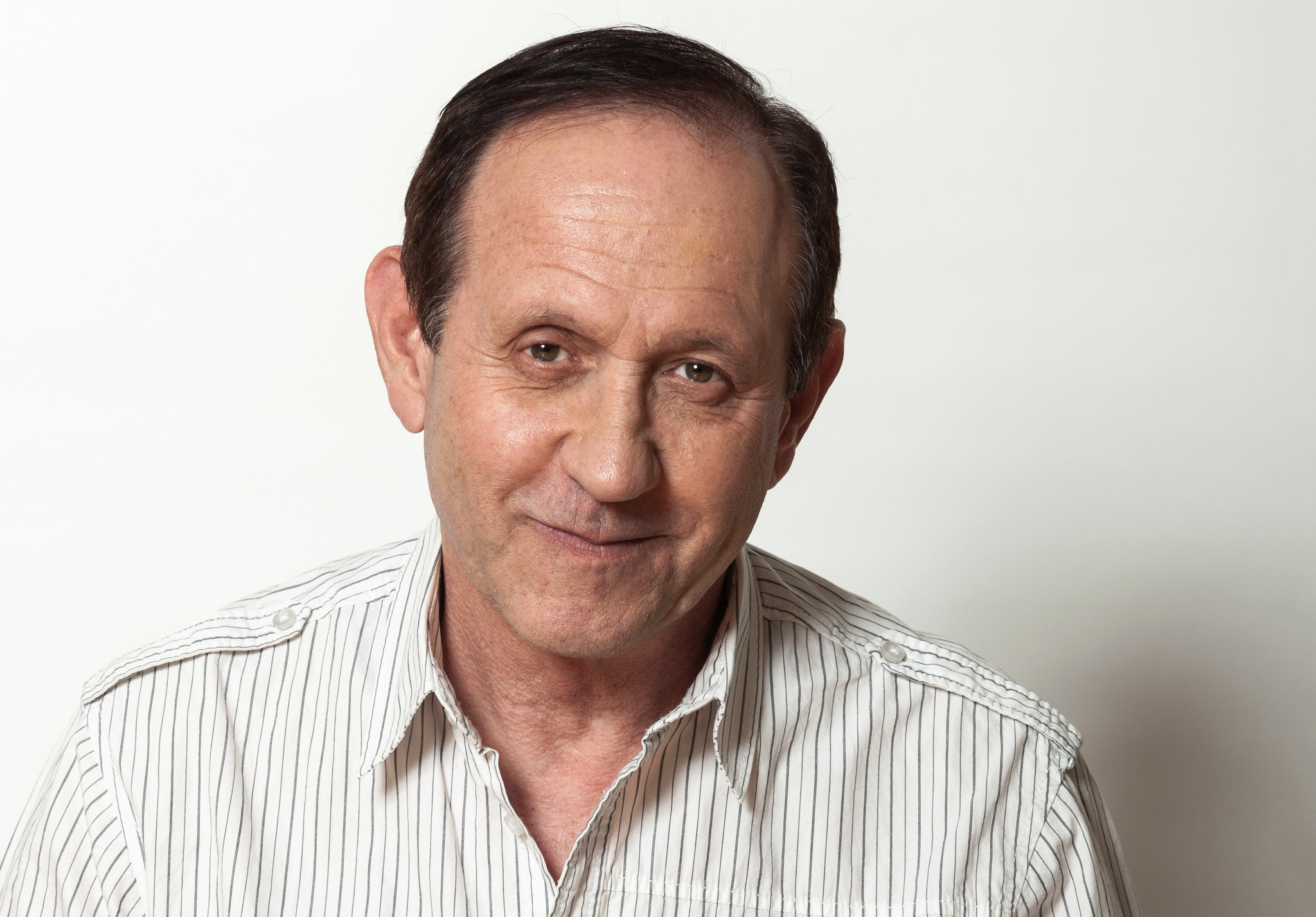
- Born: November 11, 1947 (age 78); Czechoslovakia

Gabi Gazit (Hebrew: גבי גזית; born November 11, 1947) is an Israeli journalist, television personality and radio host.

Gabi Gazit (Gabriel Greenstein), born in Czechoslovakia to a religious family, grew up in Kfar Yehoshua, a moshav in the Jezreel Valley. He did his military service in the Israel Defense Forces in a Sayeret special forces unit. Gazit was seriously wounded in a land mine explosion during the Six-Day War.

Gazit has spent much of his media career working for the Israel Broadcasting Authority, Israel's government-funded broadcasting service. He has anchored and hosted many popular television and radio news and current events programs. Currently, he is the host of a 2 hours radio program in Radio Lelo Hafsaka (103FM).

Even when he worked in the government-funded media service, Gazit was known for his frank, independent opinions. He often targets government and institutional corruption. His program gives voice to the disenfranchised, exposing dishonest practices among government officials and large corporations. He has focused on unreasonably high bank charges and the rights of survivors of the Holocaust to receive adequate social services and medical care. His liberal politics have led to criticism from the Israeli right wing.

In 2017, four women who were former colleagues made claims of sexual assault by Gazit. Gazit himself denies all wrongdoing.
