= 201 Squadron =

201 Squadron or 201st Squadron may refer to:

- 201 Squadron (Israel), a unit of the Israeli Air Force
- 201 Squadron (Portugal), a unit of the Portuguese Air Force
- 201 Squadron, Republic of Singapore Air Force; see list of Republic of Singapore Air Force squadrons
- No. 201 Squadron RAF, a unit of the Royal Air Force
- 201st Fighter Squadron, a unit of the World War II Mexican Expeditionary Air Force
- 201st Airlift Squadron, a unit of the United States District of Columbia Air National Guard
- VFA-201, a unit of the United States Naval Reserve
