= Herzl Bodinger =

Israeli Air Force general (1943–2025)

- הרצל בודינגר
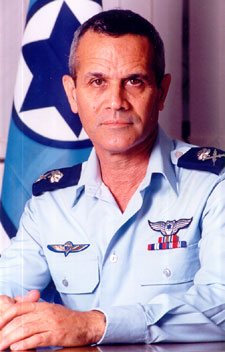
- Maj. Gen. Herzl Bodinger
- Born: 1943; Haifa, Mandatory Palestine
- Died: 10 November 2025 (aged 82)
- Burial place: Kiryat Shaul Cemetery, Israel
- Military career
- Allegiance: Israel
- Branch: Israeli Air Force
- Service years: 1961–1996
- Rank: Aluf
- Battles and wars: Arab–Israeli conflict; Six-Day War; Yom Kippur War; 1982 Lebanon War; Hezbollah–Israel conflict; Operation Accountability; Operation Grapes of Wrath

Herzl Bodinger (Hebrew: הרצל בודינגר; 1943 – 10 November 2025) was a general in the Israel Defense Forces who served as twelfth Commander of the Israeli Air Force between 1992 and 1996. He previously served several other command roles in the Israeli Air Force (IAF), and also participated in aerial operations over Egypt, Iraq, Lebanon, and Syria, shooting down two fighter jets.

== Early life and education ==
Bodinger's father, Yitzhak, was born in 1913 in Suceava, Romania, and immigrated to Mandatory Palestine in 1933; A member of Haganah, he joined the Palestine Police Force's detective department while keeping his membership of Haganah a secret. His mother, Dina Shalem, was born in Mumbai, India, in 1921, and immigrated to Haifa in 1935. She worked at the Royal Air Force Operations Center. The couple met in 1941 and married the following year. They had three children, Herzl being the firstborn. Yitzhak fought for Israel's independence during the 1948 Palestine War, also known as the 1948 Arab-Israeli War, and later joined the Israel Police as one of its founders.

Bodinger was born in Haifa in 1943. He grew up in Kiryat Motzkin and later enrolled in a boarding school in Haifa. In 1961, he joined the IAF and finished his pilot training two years later. In 1964, he was nearly killed after his plane's engines malfunctioned, forcing him to make an emergency landing. As a result, he suffered a back injury and spent several months in rehabilitation.

Later, he graduated from Bar-Ilan University with a bachelor's in economics and business administration, and he then completed a course at Harvard University in the United States.

== Air Force career ==
During the Six-Day War, Bodinger served as a Vautour pilot and participated in Operation Focus (Moked), attacking Egypt's Luxor and Beni Suef air bases and Iraq's H-3 Air Base, destroying ten Tupolev Tu-16 bombers on the ground. During the Luxor attack, his plane was struck by anti-aircraft fire, causing a fuel leak and disabling an engine. He was able to safely land in Eilat. During the Yom Kippur War, he was a Mirage III pilot, and shot down a Syrian MiG-17 during a dogfight against several jets deep in Syria. In 1984, he shot down a Syrian MiG-21 over Lebanon. He later assumed command of the 101st Squadron after the death of his commander, where he became the first person to fly the domestically-manufactured IAI Kfir aircraft. In 1989, he became a flight school commander and was also promoted to lieutenant colonel.

He rose through the ranks of the IAF in the 1980s, becoming the chief of the Air Division and the chief of staff of the Air Force. He led the Ramat David Airbase during the 1982 Lebanon War. He was promoted to brigadier general in 1984, and ordered the interception of two Syrian MiG-23s in the following year, which had been approaching Israeli aircraft above Lebanon. A military inquiry declared his decision "reasonable under the circumstances".

=== Commander of the Israeli Air Force (1992–1996) ===
In January 1992, Bodinger succeeded Avihu Ben-Nun as the commander of the IAF. During his tenure, the IAF struck Hezbollah targets in southern Lebanon as part of Operation Accountability in 1993. In 1996, the IAF again struck Hezbollah targets in southern Lebanon under his command during Operation Grapes of Wrath. During the operation, he participated in a night raid in an F-16 fighter jet, in his final aerial sortie.

Bodinger oversaw key modernization efforts by the IAF, including the acquisition of Black Hawk helicopters and F-15I fighter jets. The IDF also improved its long-range attack capabilities under his command, as a response to lessons learned in the Gulf War. In 1994, Alice Miller appealed to the Supreme Court after she was rejected training lessons due to her gender. The IDF initially opposed opening courses for women, with Bodinger arguing that the IAF needed long-term operational service, which would be incompatible with raising children or pregnancy. However, the Supreme Court ruled in Miller's favor in 1996, opening flight courses for women in one of the most significant air force developments of Bodinger's tenure. In March 1995, he visited India for a defense deal, becoming the first sitting Israeli military chief to visit the country since India–Israel relations became normalized.

His term ended in July 1996, and he was replaced by Eitan Ben Eliyahu. He retired from the IDF that same year. During his 35-year career, he accumulated about 6,000 flight hours and conducted 451 aerial sorties.

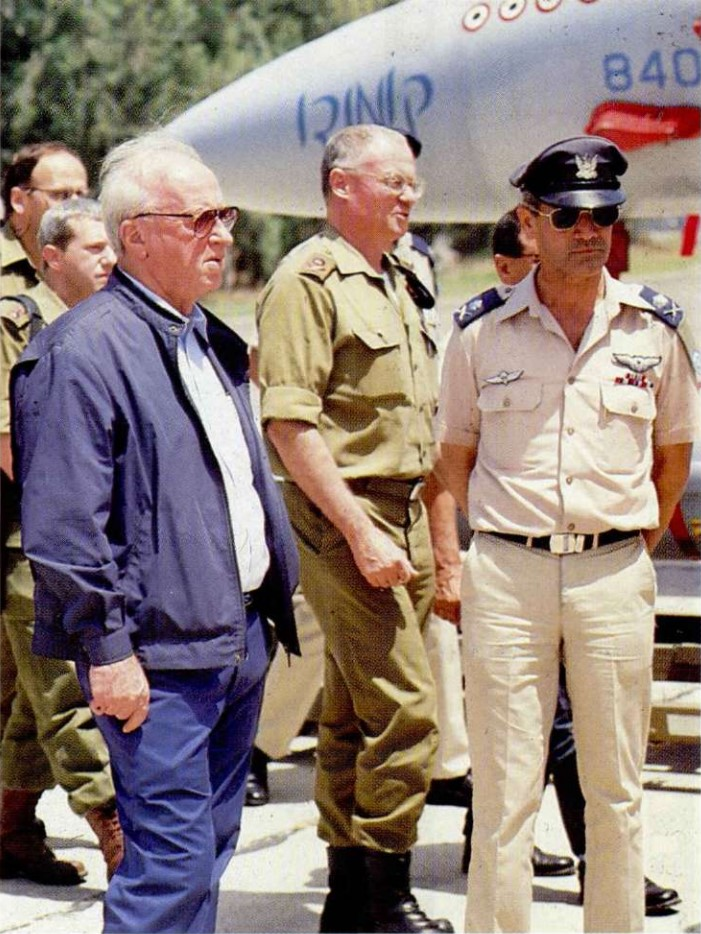
Prime Minister Yitzhak Rabin's (left) visit to the Ramat David Air Force Base, accompanied by his military secretary, Danny Yatom (center), and Bodinger (right).

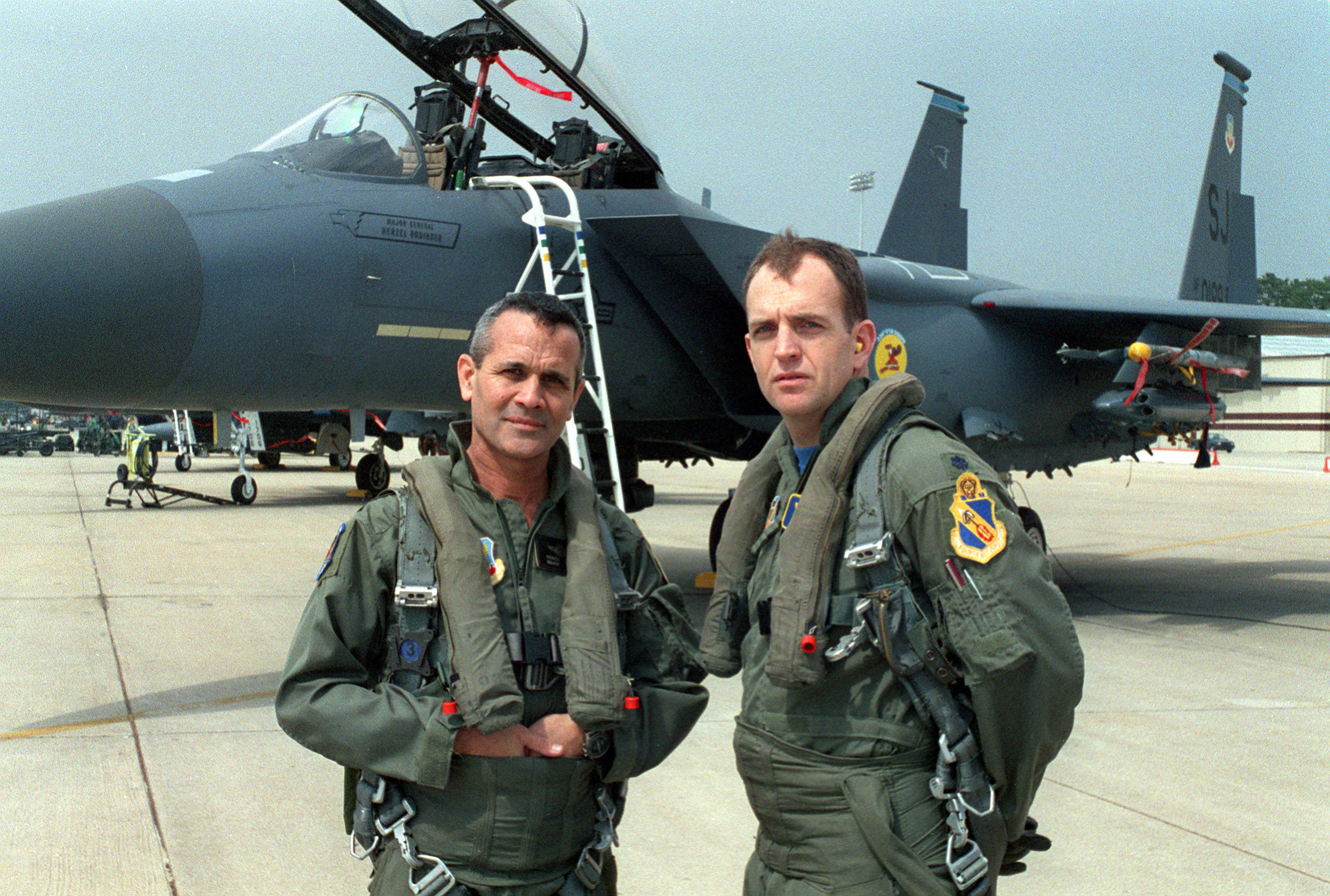
Bodinger and Lt. Col. Ralph Jodice, 335th Fighter Squadron Commander of the United States Air Force, pose in front of an F-15E, March 1994

== Civilian career ==
Following his retirement from the air force, Bodinger was appointed to head RADA Electronic Industries. In the 2000s, he headed a committee appointed by Transportation Minister Shaul Mofaz to prepare a plan for Israel's airports. He served on a governmental inquiry into the 2006 Lebanon War, but resigned due to personal reasons. He also served as a member of the International Board of Governors for Ariel University. In 2013, he was considered a candidate for National Security Advisor, but the role was given to Yossi Cohen.

== Personal life and death ==
Bodinger was married and had four children, including Ilan, who served as a fighter pilot with the rank of lieutenant colonel.

He died on 10 November 2025, at the age of 82. His funeral was held the following day at the Kiryat Shaul Cemetery, during which then-IAF commander Tomer Bar paid tribute to him.
