= Eliezer Shkedi =

Israeli Air Force general (born 1957)

Eliezer Shkedy
- אליעזר שקדי
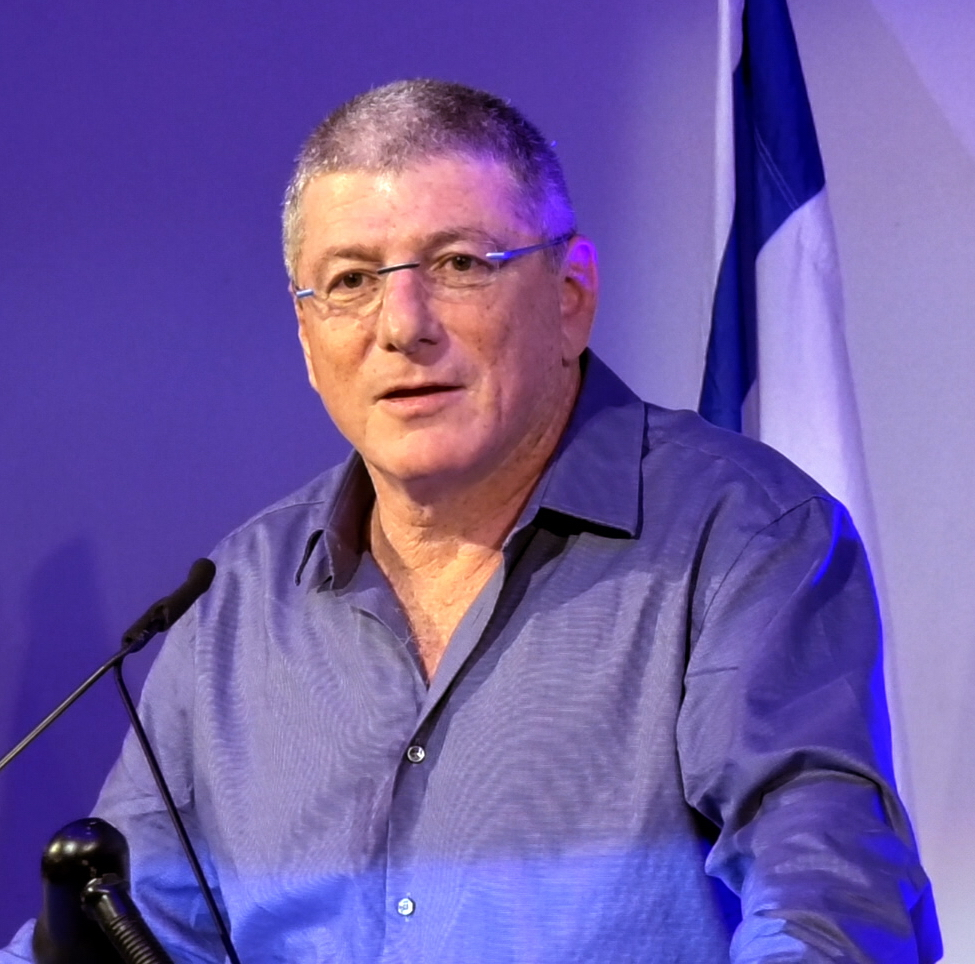

Commander of the Israeli Air Force
- In office 4 April 2004 – 13 May 2008
- Prime Minister: Ariel Sharon; Ehud Olmert
- IDF Chief: Dan Halutz; Gabi Ashkenazi
- Preceded by: Dan Halutz
- Succeeded by: Ido Nehoshtan

CEO of El Al
- In office 2009–2014
- Preceded by: Haim Romano
- Succeeded by: David Maimon

Personal details
- Born: August 16, 1957 (age 68)

Military service
- Allegiance: Israel
- Branch/service: Israeli Air Force
- Years of service: 1975–2008
- Rank: Major General
- Commands: 109 Squadron; Ramat David Airbase; IAF Chief of Air Staff; Israeli Air Force
- Battles/wars: 1982 Lebanon War; 2006 Lebanon War

Aluf Eliezer "Eli" Shkedy (Hebrew: אליעזר "אלי" שקדי; born 16 August 1957) is a retired general in the Israel Defense Forces, who served as commander of the Israeli Air Force from 4 April 2004 until 13 May 2008. He is also a former CEO of El Al, the flag carrier of Israel.

Shkedy was born in Israel; his father was a Hungarian-Jewish Holocaust survivor, whereas his mother was an Egyptian-Jewish immigrant.

Shkedy, a former resident of Yehud-Monosson, was born in Israel. He grew up in Hod HaSharon and Kfar Saba, and after graduating from high school in Kfar Saba he was conscripted into the IDF in 1975. He was accepted into the IAF Flight Academy and graduated as a fighter pilot. Shkedy was a member of several units before he was assigned to Hatzerim Airbase. He was based there during the 1982 Lebanon War in which he shot down two enemy aircraft.

In the mid-1980s, Shkedy studied at Ben-Gurion University, receiving a B.Sc. in Mathematics and Computer Science. He continued his career in the IAF until the mid-1990s when he studied for an M.A. in Systems management at the US Naval Postgraduate School in California.

He was promoted to commander of the Israeli Air Force on 4 April 2004 and was succeeded in the position by Aluf Ido Nehoshtan upon his retirement on 13 May 2008. He is the chairman of the NGO Heroes for life.

General Shkedy was appointed front commander against countries that do not border Israel. This put him in charge of Israeli Iran Command, which was set up to be the overall coordinator of Israeli military operations and intelligence gathering against Iran should a war start between the two countries. Although the appointment was reported in late August 2006, it was said to have occurred before the Second Lebanon War began.
