= 140 Squadron (Israel) =

Israeli military unit

- טייסת נשר הזהב
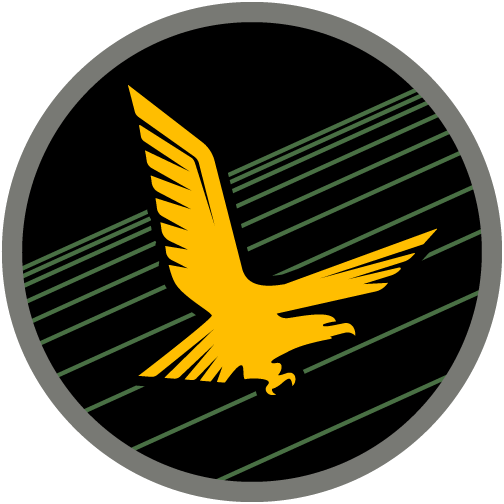
- Country: Israel
- Branch: Israeli Air Force
- Garrison/HQ: Nevatim Airbase

Aircraft flown
- Attack: F-35I Adir

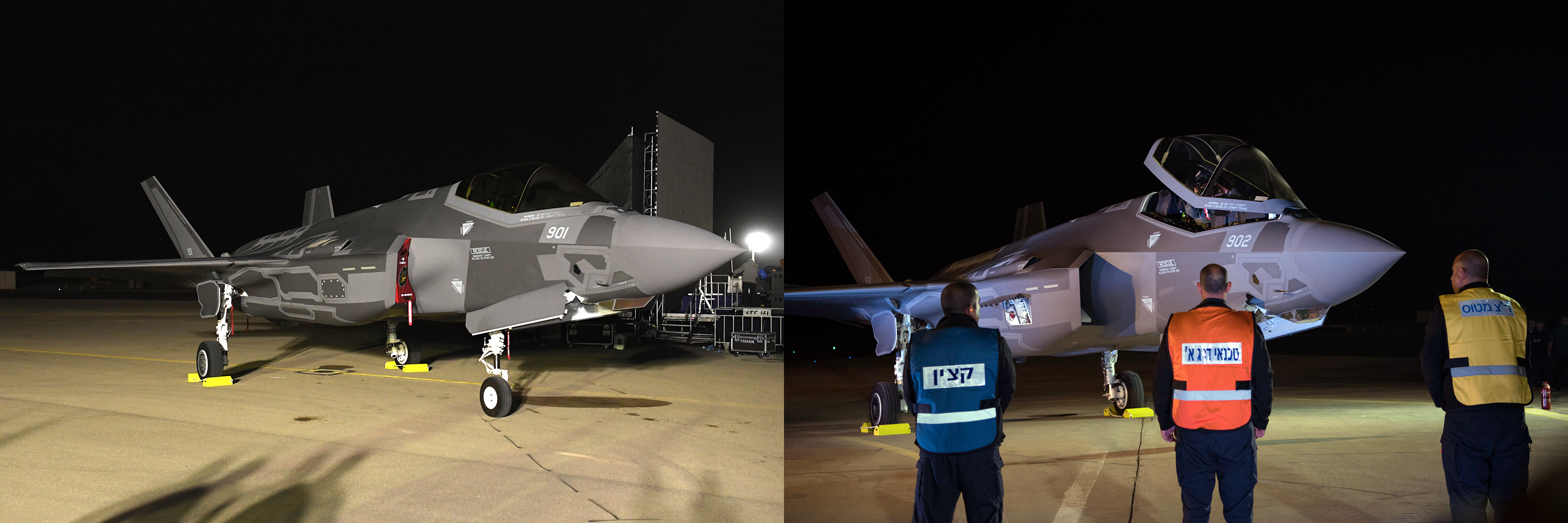
140 Squadron's and Israel's first two F-35I jets on its arrival at Nevatim Airbase, December 2016

140 Squadron of the Israeli Air Force (IAF), also Golden Eagle Squadron, is an F-35I Adir squadron based at Nevatim Airbase in Israel.

== History ==
Formerly an A-4H/N and then an F-16A/B squadron, the squadron was closed in August 2013, as part of IDF budget cuts. Its aircraft were allocated to 116 Squadron (Defenders of the South).

In 2015, it was announced that the "Golden Eagle" Squadron would be the first Lockheed Martin F-35 Lightning II Squadron in the IAF. The squadron received its first two aircraft in December 2016.

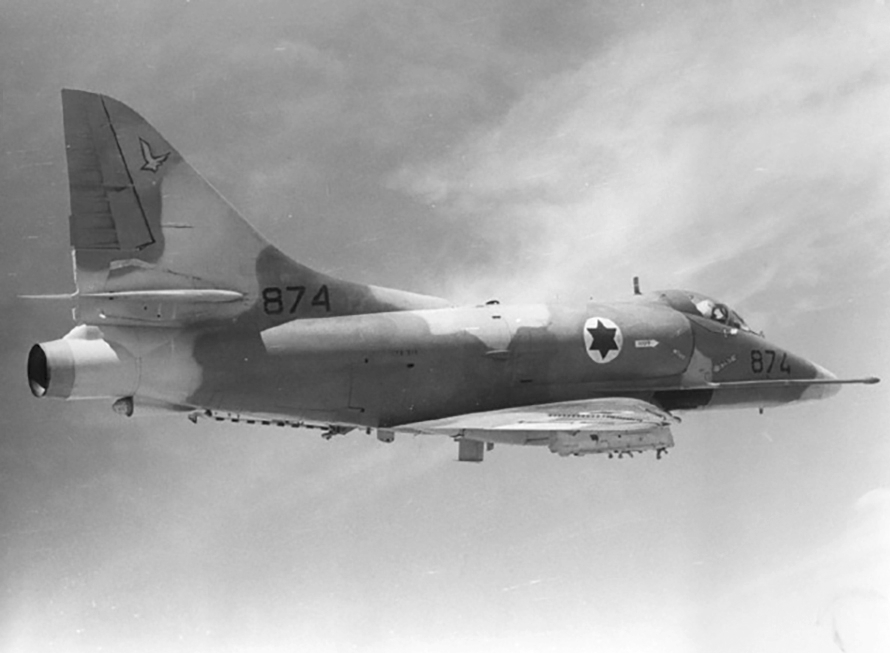
An A-4H/N Skyhawk Ayit of 140 Squadron "Golden Eagle" of Etzion Airbase around 1973

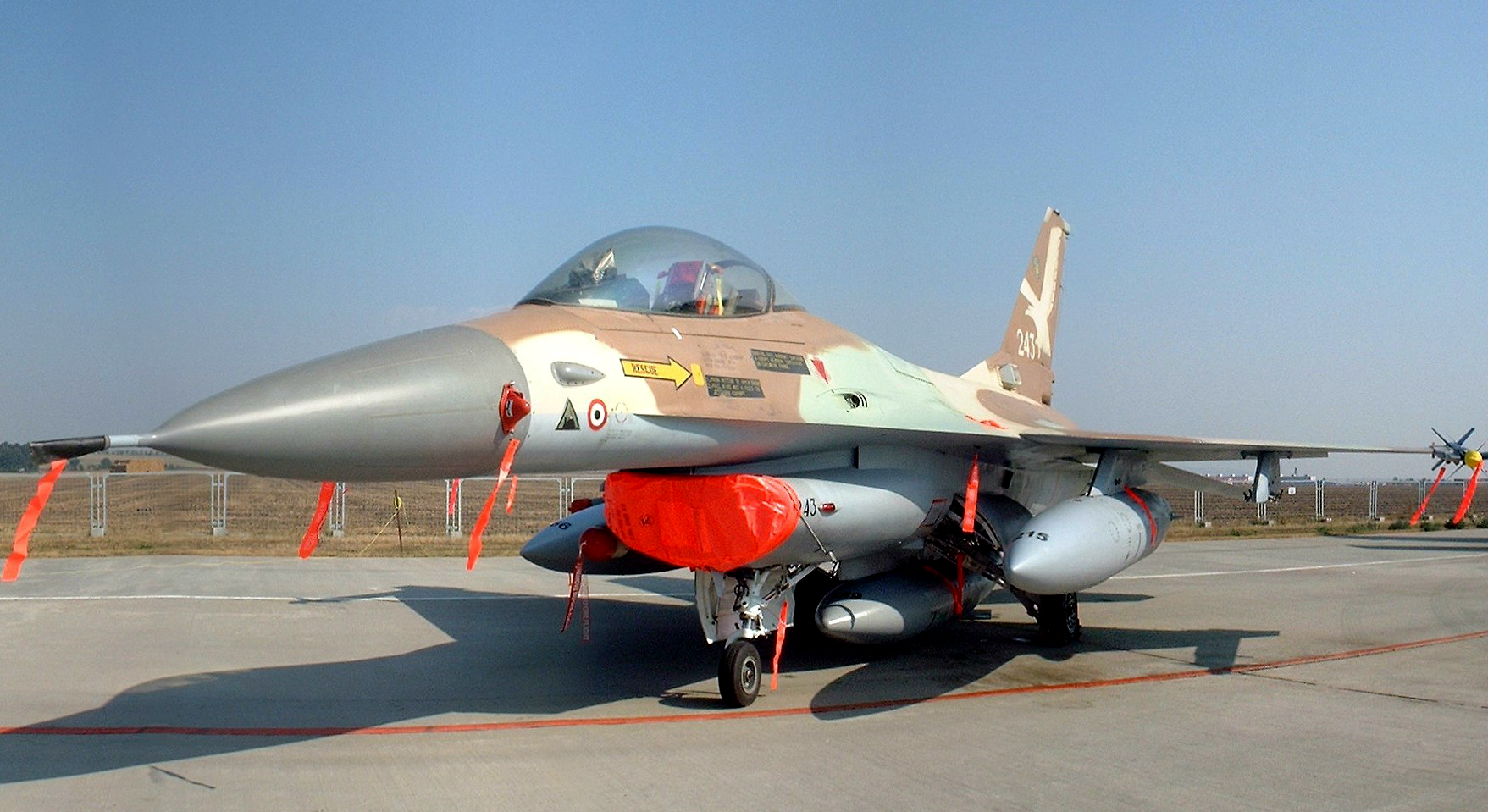
The F-16A Netz #243 of Ilan Ramon, involved in Operation Opera, exhibited in Czechia in 2004
