= Israeli Air Force Flight Academy =

Israeli Air Force School

The Israeli Air Force Flight Academy (Hebrew: קורס טיס; romanized: Kurs Tais; lit: flight course) trains aircrew to operate Israeli Air Force aircraft, qualifying fighter, helicopter and transport pilots as well as combat and transport navigators.

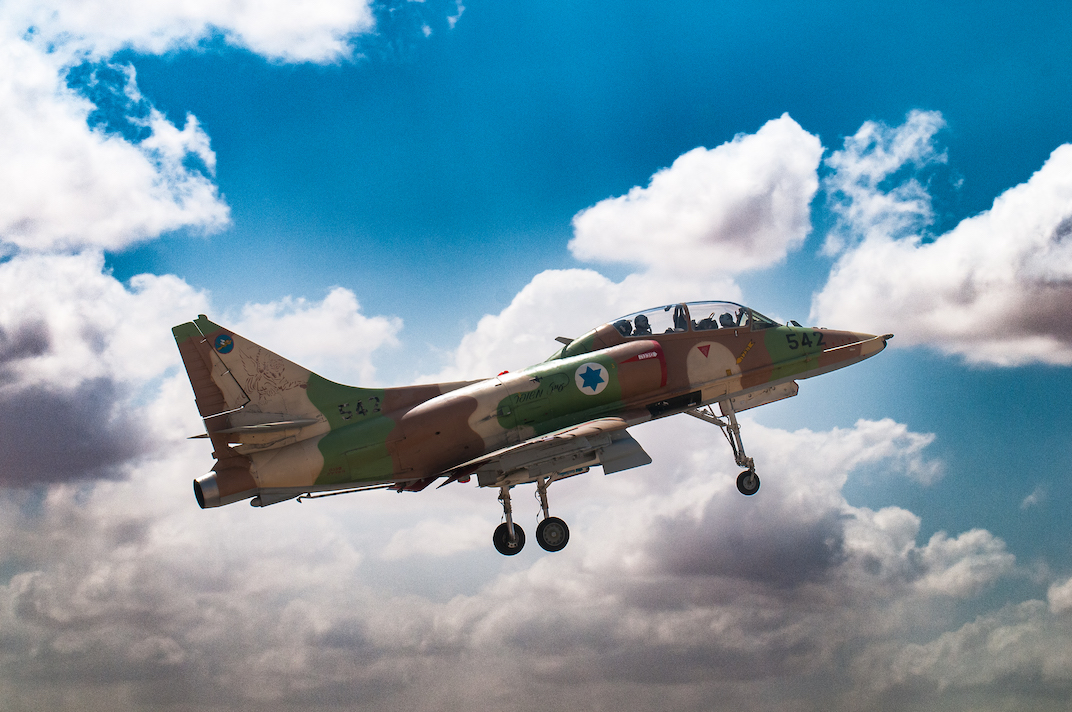
Israeli Air Force Flight Academy A-4 Skyhawk Takeoff pictured September, 2008

The IAF flight course is considered one of the most prestigious courses in the IDF. It lasts for three years and is held largely in the Hatzerim Airbase near Beer Sheva. Graduates of the course receive the rank of lieutenant and a BA from the Ben-Gurion University of the Negev. After their training, the graduates must undertake mandatory military service of seven years. In earlier times, on average, only one out of nine students completed the course successfully, but today it is closer to one out of six due to stricter selection for the course.

== History ==
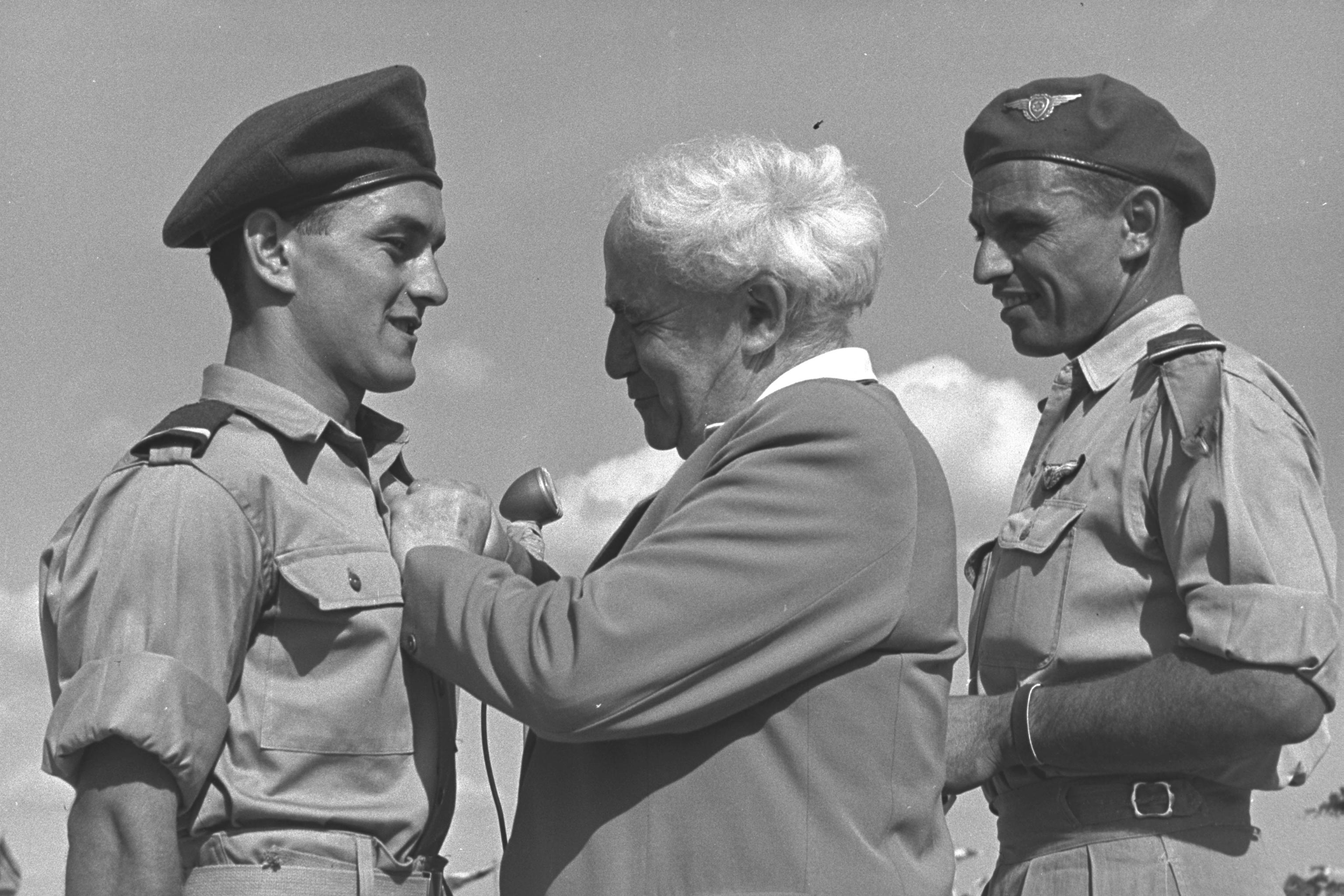
Prime Minister David Ben-Gurion at a Graduation ceremony of the IAF flight course, 10 August 1950

The first IAF flight course was completed in March 1949 in Hatzor Airbase. The first four graduates, including Mordechai Hod and Danny Shapira, had received their training in Czechoslovakia. In May 1949 12 more graduates completed the second IAF flight course, which also took place mostly in Czechoslovakia. The first flight course held entirely in Israel was held at Camp Sirkin, near Petah Tikva, and began on 14 February 1950. The first base commander was Benjamin Bune (Bunislavsky), the first chief training officer was Gideon Shochat, the first commander of the primary flight school was Pinchas Ben-Porat, and the first commander of the advanced flight school was George Lichter. Dan Tolkowsky headed the IAF's training department from 1948 to 1951. Most of the flight instructors at the time were foreign and the official language of the course was English. The course ended on 10 August 1950 and had 13 pilot graduates and four navigator graduates. In order to prepare them as fighter pilots, in December 1950 a separate operational training squadron was established, flying the Supermarine Spitfire.

Until 1955 the flight courses took place at the Sirkin Airbase, before moving to the Tel Nof Airbase. In April 1966 the IAF flight course was transferred once more to Hatzerim Airbase. With the increasing need for helicopter pilots, in 1965 a helicopter flight school was established within the IAF flight school. Until then all the helicopter pilots were trained in Europe and the United States.

In 2002 the structure of the flight course changed, it was extended from two years to three years, and included undergraduate academic studies. In addition, since 2002 the flight course graduates receive the rank of Lieutenant, and not the rank of Second Lieutenant.

== Pilot Selection ==
The selection process for IAF pilots can be traced to Ezer Weizman. He emphasized the importance of air capability, arguing that ground forces could be severely compromised if they were vulnerable to attacks from above. Consequently, only individuals deemed to have the natural aptitude to excel as Israeli pilots are invited to start the training process. Among those, only the most qualified manage to complete what many consider the world's most challenging military selection course.

Consequently, potential Israeli pilots are identified prior to reporting for national service at age 18, based on factors such as high grades in school and top scores on standardized tests, excellent physical condition and high technical aptitude. All recruits must also have a Medical profile of 97. Those who meet these and other criteria are invited to participate in a five-day gibush (cohesion), a selection phase involving physical, mental, and sociometric challenges. Recruits are screened not only for their ability to perform the tasks assigned, but for their attitude in performing them—such as how they take hardships and unexpected difficulties, how well they work in groups and how they approach problem solving and disaster management situations. As many as 50% of those who commence the gibush will be dropped from further consideration at its conclusion.

Those who pass the gibush embark on a three-year journey to earn their wings, which includes extensive flight training, infantry training, an officer's course, and studies towards a bachelor's degree. The prospective pilots are evaluated constantly, and the vast majority of those who begin flight training do not make it through the full program. Those dropped from the course will either remain in the air force in a non-flying capacity, or transfer to an army unit. (This depends to a large degree on the stage at which they leave the course.)

While in flying school, future pilots are sorted and assigned to train on different types of aircraft. Relatively few become fighter pilots (considered by many to be the most desirable assignment), while the remainder learn to fly helicopters, transport aircraft, or train as navigators.

After a landmark 1994 High Court appeal by a Jewish immigrant from South Africa, Alice Miller, the Air Force was instructed to open its flight school to women. Miller passed her entrance exams, yet failed the medical tests and thus did not qualify. The first female fighter pilot, Roni Zuckerman, received her wings in 2001, although a female navigator had already graduated in 1998.

While Israeli Arabs may volunteer to serve in the IDF, it is unclear whether they can seek air force training. In 2006, an Israeli Arab applied for the pilot program, but was not accepted. In 2009 the first Israeli Druze finished the course and received his wings. In early 2018, it was announced that a Bedouin candidate had been accepted into the pilot course.

== Course phases ==
=== Preparatory phase ===
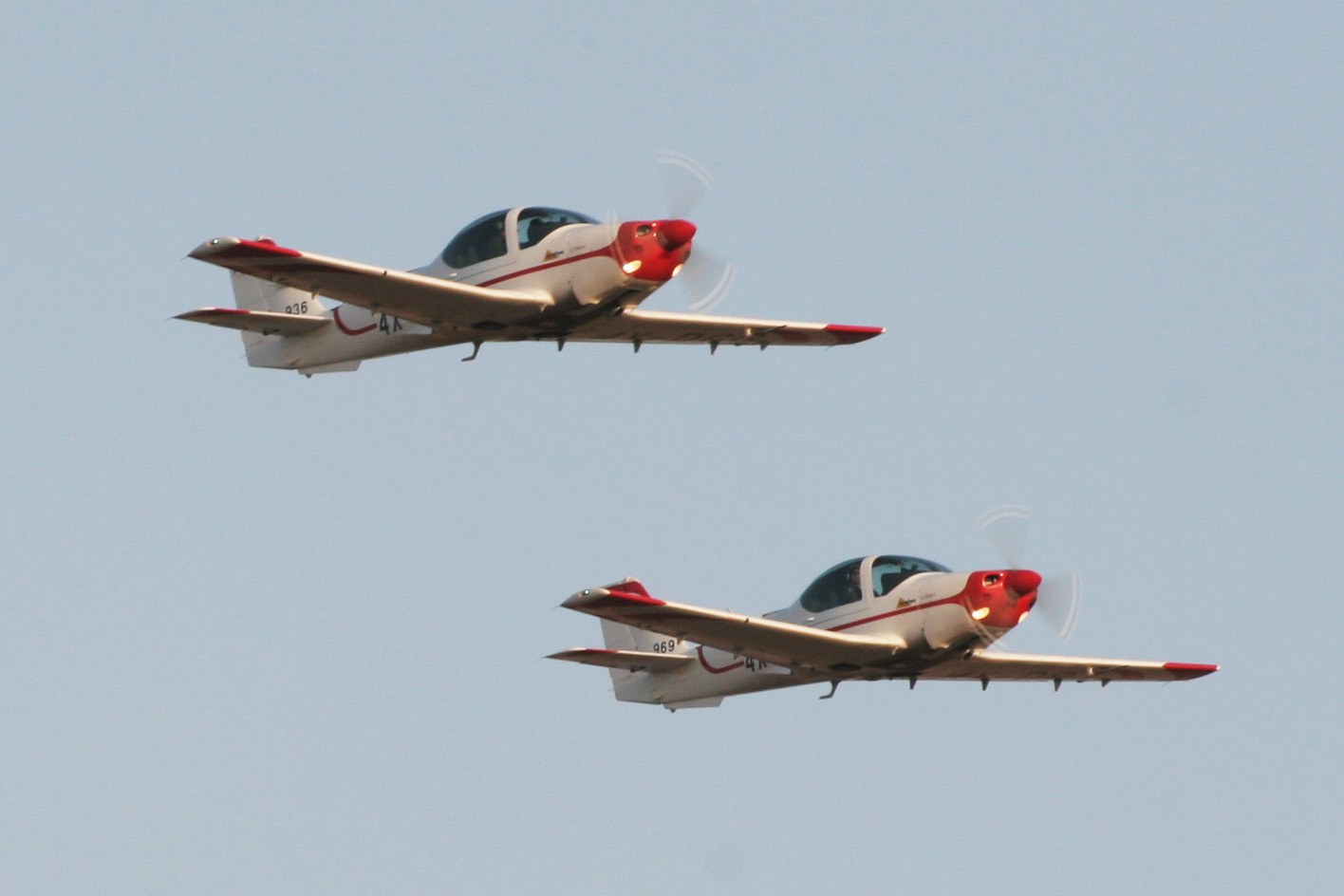
A pair of Grob G-120A aircraft at the IAF cadet graduation ceremony

The first phase of the flight course lasts about six months. It includes an eight-week infantry basic training course at the Infantry School of the Air Force, courses in mathematics, physics, and aerodynamics, an eight-week course which focuses on the history of IDF, and a month of training flights in a Grob G 120 plane.

During this and most of the following phases of the course the cadets wear a Beret with a white stripe around the edge, and a white background behind the Air Force symbol.

=== Basics phase ===
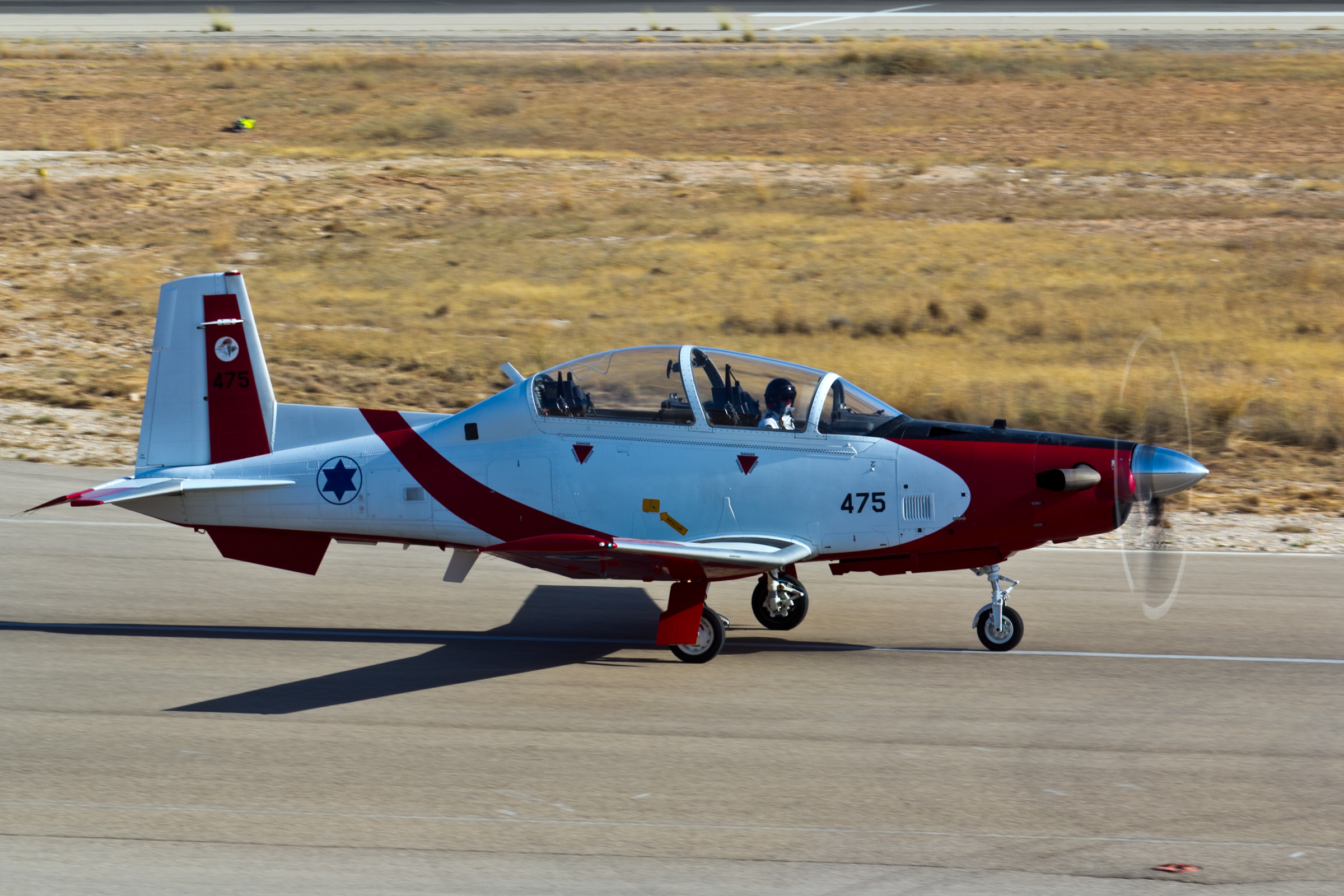
T-6 Texan II basic trainer

This phase lasts about five months. It includes a complex infantry course (including navigation, survival, etc.), parachuting course, hand to hand combat, escaping workshop, and Officers Ordination. The cadets also undergo a series of six-week academic courses on aerodynamics, airplane structure, and other topics.

Immediately after the end of the five months of the basic phase there is a testing period followed by the placement of cadets in the various formations: combat pilots, helicopter pilots, transport pilots, and navigators. The cadets undergo test flights in more complex aircraft, with cadets flying different aircraft based on the formation they are assigned to. At the end of the phase, the cadets receive an IAF pin in a ceremony at Masada. Cadets who are dropped from the course at this phase can request to join the UAV operators course, or choose to serve as non-flying officers in the Israeli Air Force—such as air controllers, base security specialists or intelligence officers.

=== Preliminary phase ===
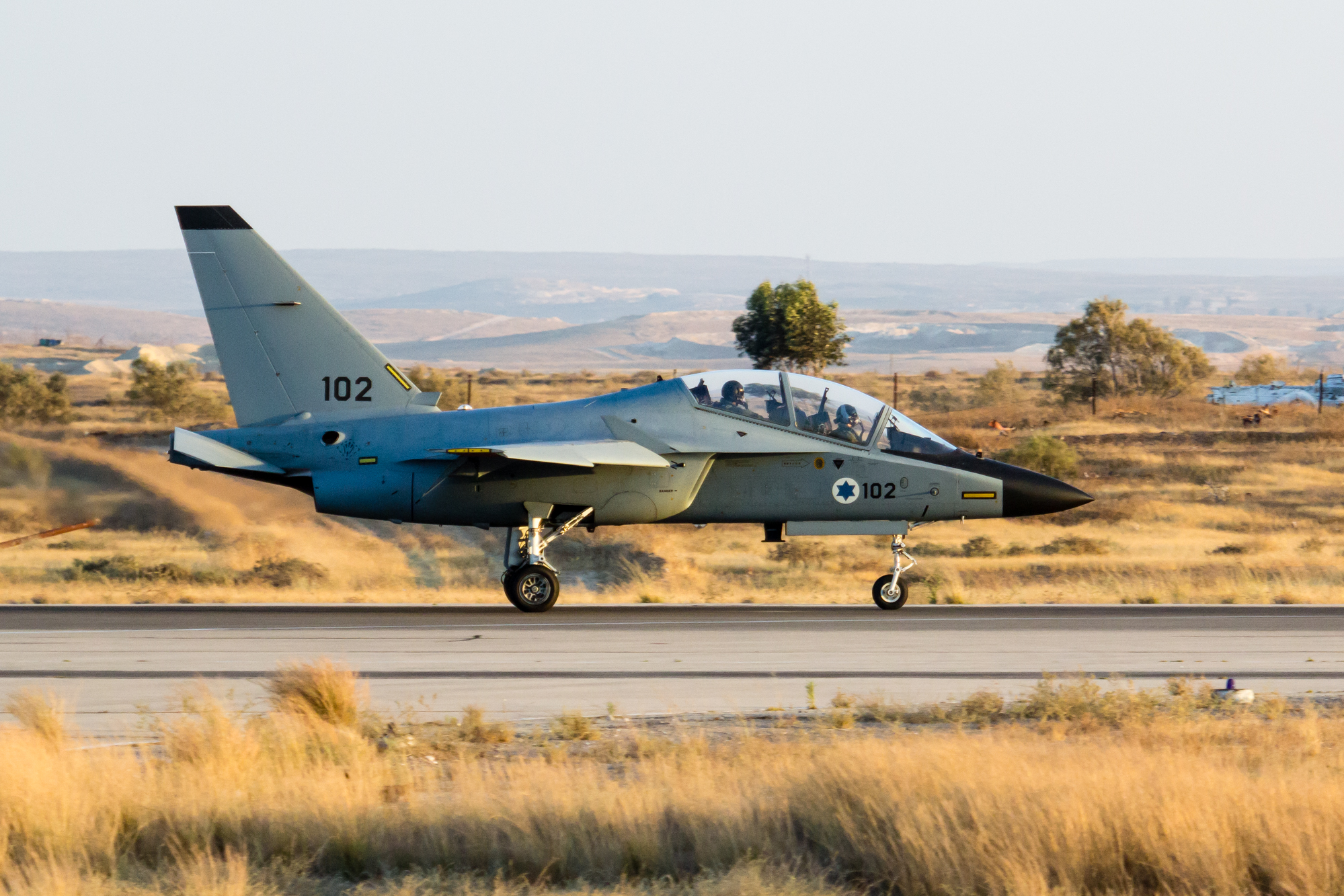
M-346 Master advanced trainer of the combat pilots and combat navigators department

During this phase, the cadets are trained in basic aircraft operating skills. This part of the course mostly consists of training flights. The cadets also study flight mechanics, computer applications, introductory statistics, management, and alegbra, all in relation to flight formations.

=== Introductions phase and graduate courses phase ===
These are two phases in which the cadets study the majority of the content needed to get the BA. These two phases, which are commonly referred to as the "Year of Education" (שנת ההשכלה), last for about a year. Consecutive academic studies for a BA are done under the auspices of Ben-Gurion University of the Negev. Cadets are placed in one of four available courses: Politics and Administration, Economics and Management, Mathematics and Computer Science, or Management of Information Systems. The intensive academic year (not equivalent to regular university studies) consists of three semesters, of 13 weeks each. Every semester ends with a final exam. In addition, the cadets study physics, aerodynamics, meteorology, weapon systems, and navigation, as well as the history of the IDF and IAF in particular, and take three courses in English.

=== Advanced phase ===
This is the last phase of the course, during which the cadets fly operational aircraft and train in advanced combat skills. They also complete their degrees and study a variety of weapon systems. At the end of this phase, the cadets receive a Lieutenant rank, a BA, and an aircraft wings pin, officially becoming pilots in the Israeli Air Force.

=== Course completion ===
Three years after beginning the course, and two weeks before its completion, a special committee meets to examine all the cadets and determine which ones will be completing the course. While rare, it is not unknown for some cadets to be dropped from the course even at this late stage. Near the end of their training, cadets also undergo a two-week course in captivity endurance. After preparatory instruction, cadets endure a mock kidnapping and are held in prison-like conditions where they are subjected to intense interrogations and abuse, including real violence, and demeaning activities.

After the special committee completes its deliberations, the cadets who will be graduating begin preparing for the ceremony. There are two graduation ceremonies every year, one in the spring and one in the fall. One of the graduates' final tasks is to act as the induction cadre for the next class of cadets arriving to begin their gibush, introducing them to military service via a series of punishing physical and mental challenges.

Current badge "wings" of an Israeli Air Force pilot

The graduation ceremony, at which the new pilots and navigators receive their wings insignia, is conducted in the presence of the cadets' families, senior government officials (frequently including the prime minister), as well as top air force and army leaders. At both ceremonies, an air show is presented by Air Force helicopters and planes.

After the course ends, the pilots undergo a year of operational training, beginning with a course in an operational squadron that lasts about six months and prepares them for operational missions. The course for fighter pilots is conducted in either the M-346 Lavi or the F-15, F-16 or F-35. This is followed by another six months of advanced operational training courses on the same plane. Operational training courses for helicopter pilots are conducted on the UH-60 Black Hawk, operational training courses for attack helicopter pilots on the AH-64 Apache, and operational training courses for transport aircraft on the Beechcraft Super King Air.

== Notable alumni ==
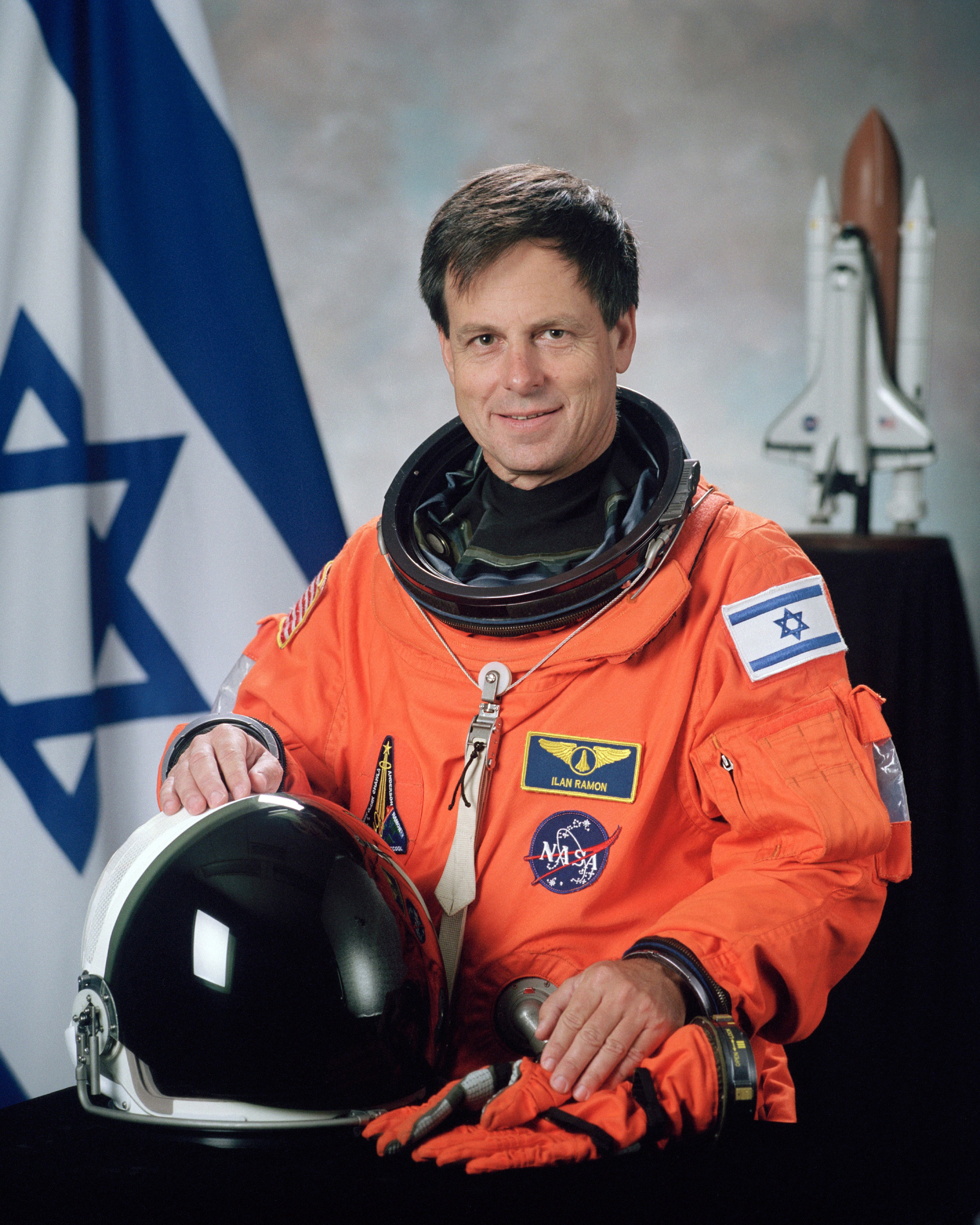
Ilan Ramon, IAF fighter pilot and the first Israeli astronaut, graduated from the IAF flight course in 1974.

- Ilan Ramon
- Ron Arad
- Yael Rom
- Mordechai Hod
- Eitan Ben Eliyahu
- Benny Peled
- Yaakov Turner
- Dan Halutz
- Eliezer Shkedi
- Herzl Bodinger
- Avihu Ben-Nun
- Avraham Lanir
- Amos Lapidot
- David Ivry
- Amos Yadlin
- Eliezer Cohen
- Amir Nachumi
- Giora Romm
