= 116 Squadron (Israel) =

Israeli military unit

116th Squadron IAF
- טייסת 116
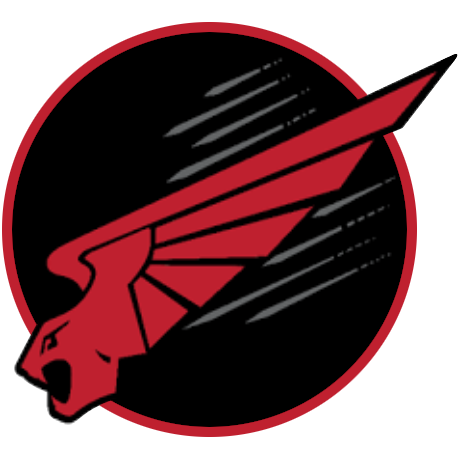
- Logo of the Squadron
- Active: 1952 – present
- Country: Israel
- Allegiance: Israel Defense Forces
- Branch: Israeli Air Force
- Type: Stealth Aircraft fighter squadron
- Role: Stealth operations
- Garrison/HQ: Nevatim Airbase
- Nickname: Lions of the South

Aircraft flown
- Fighter: F-35I

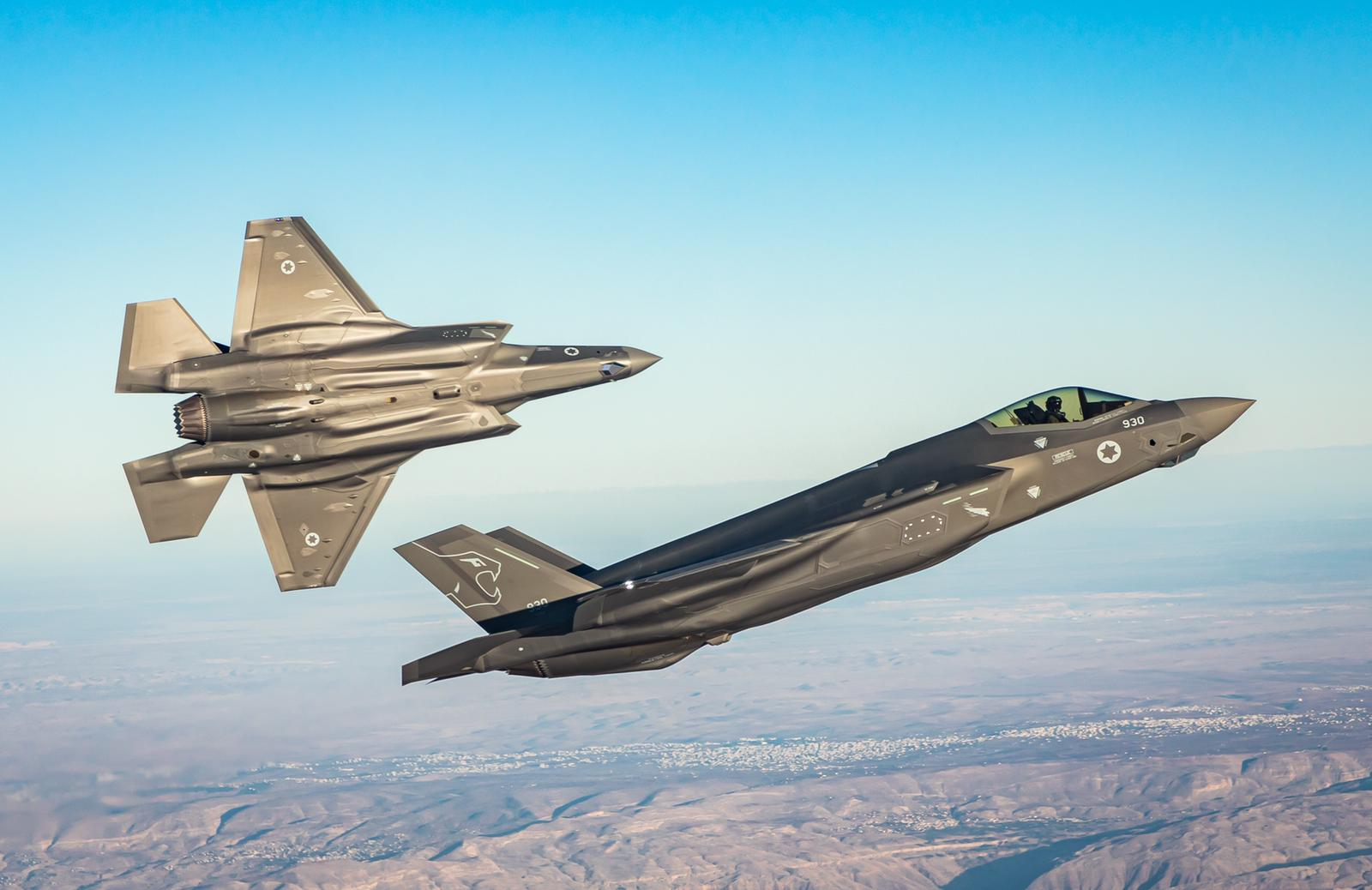
Two F-35I Adir of 116 Squadron "Lions of the South" (lion symbol at tail) from Nevatim Airbase

116 Squadron of the Israeli Air Force, also known as Lions of the South Squadron (former Flying Wing and Defenders of the South Squadron), is an F-35I Adir stealth fighter squadron based at Nevatim Airbase. They once flew the F-16A/B.

== History ==
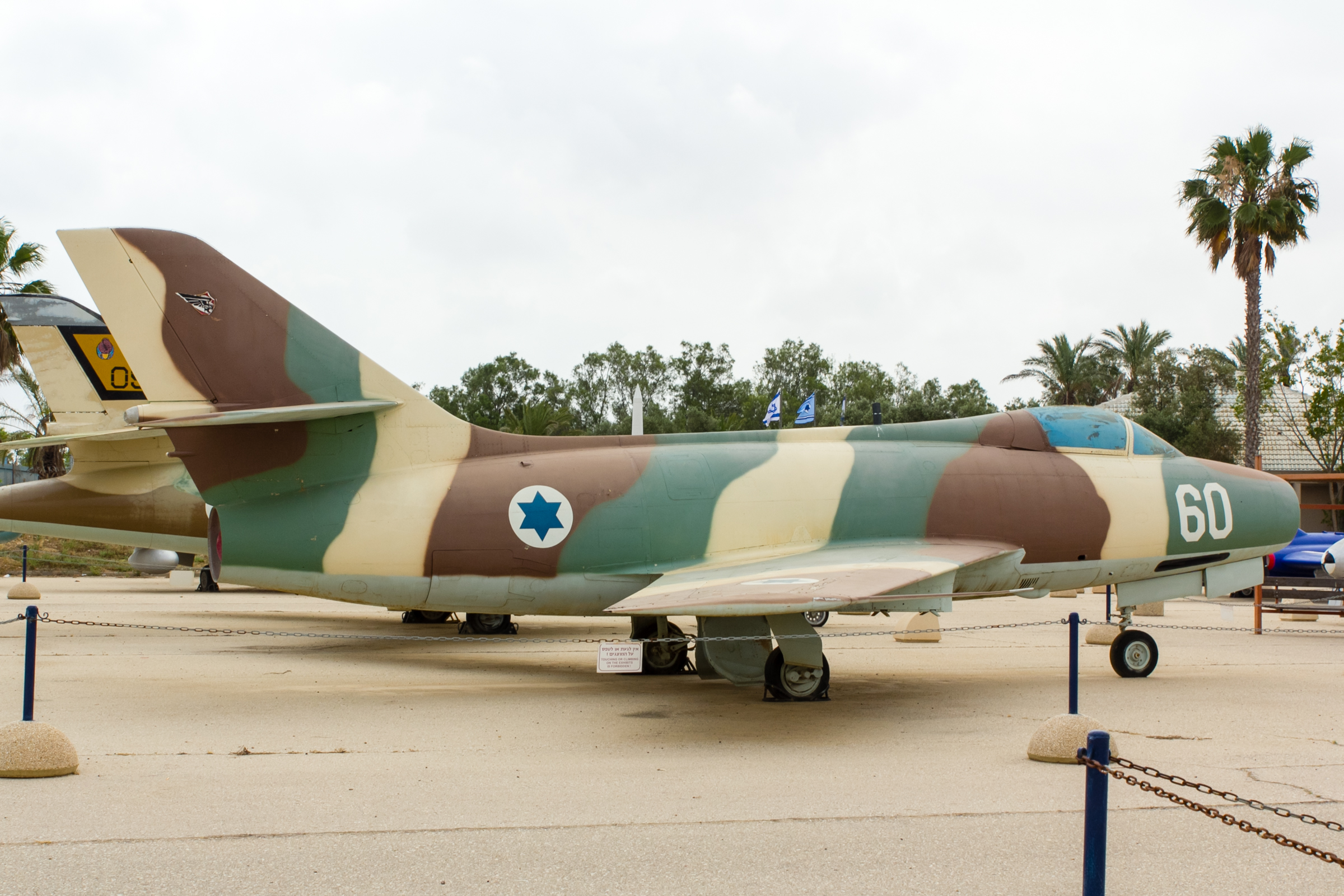
A Mystère IV A jet of the squadron during the 1960s at Tel Nof Airbase – today at the IAF Museum

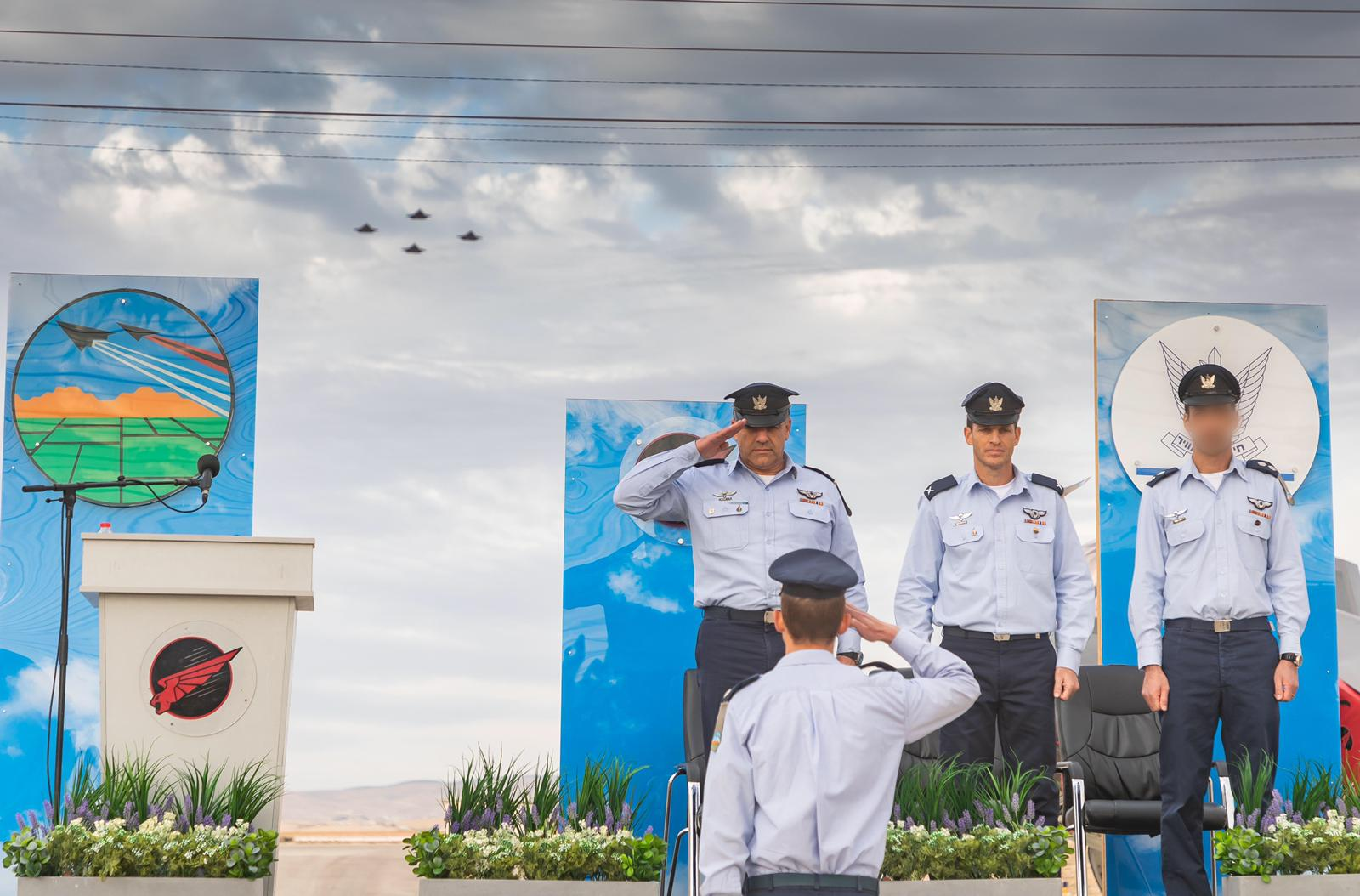
Arrival ceremony of F-35 at the squadron

The squadron was established in 1956 as a P-51 Mustang squadron under the name "Flying Wing Squadron". The squadron was established as an IDF squadron (emergency deployment), when 14 flight instructors from the flight school at the Tel Nof base, then Ekron, were assigned to it. Its first commander was the commander of the school, Major Tzaik Yavne, and the only regular pilot in it was Lt. Amitai Hasson "Shapan". The squadron was established at the Tel Nof base (Ekron), next to the flight school.

In Operation Kadesh, the squadron's planes gave the starting signal for war – four of the squadron's planes used their propellers to tear the Egyptian telephone cables in Sinai in order to sever the connection between the Egyptian army deployed in Sinai and its headquarters in Cairo. During the war, the squadron made 66 sorties, most of them preventing sorties and providing close assistance to the ground forces. 6 of the squadron's planes were lost, one pilot was killed and the other was captured.

At the beginning of 1957 the squadron received the planes of the 105 squadron and its reserve pilots. In 1959, the Harvard aircraft of Squadron 140 were added to the squadron. On 15 January 1961, the Mustang aircraft was taken out of service and the squadron was closed.

In October 1961, the squadron was re-established at Hatzor Airbase with the pilots and the Dassault Mystère IV planes of squadron 101 which was preparing to receive the Dassault Mirage III plane. The first squadron commander during the Mystère period was Rafi Har-Lev, and his deputies were Ran Packer and Aharon "Yello" Shavit. Two weeks later the squadron moved back to the Tel Nof base.

In the Six Day War, in the first wave, 6 buildings from the squadron attacked Fayed Airport. One of the carriers, the squadron commander, Major Yonatan Shahar, was injured by the explosion of a plane he bombed, abandoned his plane and was rescued during the night. Shahar was replaced by his lieutenant, Avihu Ben-Nun. During the war, the squadron made 269 operational sorties, 5 of its planes were shot down, two pilots were killed and one was captured.

In November 1967, two formations from the squadron went on a mission to attack Jordanian armor that bombed IDF positions around Beit Shan as part of the Umm Short incident. The plane of Capt. David Nebo, the deputy commander of the squadron, was hit, he abandoned and was killed immediately upon reaching the ground.

In 1968, the squadron received the Mystère planes of Squadron 109, together with the reserve pilots and the Air Force, in preparation for receiving the Skyhawk planes in this squadron. The squadron operated throughout the war of attrition, during which it even lost one of its fighters. On 18 March 1971, the Mystère planes made their last flight.

On 18 February 1971, the Skyhawk Model H planes of the squadron arrived in Israel, and on 7 March 1971, the first flight was made by the squadron commander, Major Yossi Aviv.

During the Yom Kippur War, Major Ehud Shelah commanded the squadron. During the war, planes and pilots of Squadron 140, which was in the stages of being established at the Etzion base, were added to the squadron. Ehud Shelah was replaced by Major Shmuel Ben-Rom. Two pilots were captured.

After the war, the squadron's aircraft were replaced by a more advanced model, the Model N. This model served in the squadron until its closure as the Skyhawk Squadron. In October 1983 the squadron was the first squadron to move to the Nevatim Airbase, and in 1985 the squadron, with its then commander Amos Yadlin, also became a KAM squadron, an advanced training course.

In 2002 the squadron finished its operational flights as the Skyhawk squadron. In 2003, it received F-16 Fighting Falcon models A and B, "Hawk", and renamed it "Defenders of the South". In August 2013, Squadron 116 received into its ranks the Hawk aircraft of Squadron 140, most of its personnel and the KAM branch (operational training course), after the latter was closed as part of the cuts in the security system. In the summer of 2015, the squadron was closed as the "Hawk" squadron. The closing of the squadron was the end of the operational era of the "Hawk" planes in the Air Force.

Then the squadron was revitalised after the arrival of F-35 Adir lightning planes.

== Sources ==
- "The "Defenders of the South" squadron". Israeli Air Force website.
- "The "Defenders of the South" squadron". Merchav. Archived from the original on 2021-10-26.
