= Planning Directorate =

- אגף התכנון
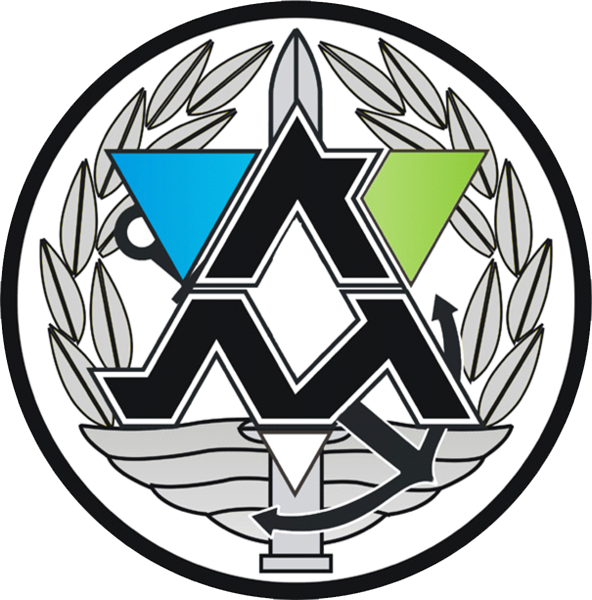
- Active: 1948 - present
- Country: Israel
- Allegiance: Israel Defense Forces

Commanders
- Current commander: Aluf Hidai Zilberman

Insignia
- Flag

The Planning Directorate (Hebrew: אגף התכנון, Acronym: AGAT) is a division in the Israel Defense Forces' General Staff, whose focus is on strategic and tactical planning, building the military forces, and coordinating operations to design and plan the campaigns. It also serves as a planning body for the Ministry of Defense, representing IDF in various related fields to the Minister of Defense.

== History ==
Ramatkal Dan Halutz reorganized the Directorate in 2006 to incorporate the old External Relations Directorate. In 2020, the Planning Directorate was split into two General Staff Directorates: the main Planning and Force Building Division, led by Aluf Tomer Bar, which retained most of the Planning Division's former functions, and the Strategy and Third-Circle Directorate, led by Aluf Tal Kalman.

In 2025, with the appointment of Eyal Zamir as Chief of Staff, the Strategy and Third Circle Division was closed and merged back into the Planning Division.

== Formation ==
The division comprises the Planning Division, Strategic Planning and Tactical Relations Division, Centre for Systems Analysis, and the Infrastructure and Organization Division.
