= Israeli Air Force =

Aerial and space service branch of the Israel Defense Forces

- זְרוֹעַ הָאֲוִיר וְהֶחָלָל
- Emblem of the Israeli Air Force
- Founded: May 28, 1948; 78 years ago
- Country: Israel
- Type: Air force; Space force
- Role: Aerial warfare; Space warfare
- Size: 34,000 active personnel; 55,000 reserve personnel; 594 aircraft
- Part of: Israel Defense Forces
- Headquarters: HaKirya, Tel Aviv, Israel
- Website: www.iaf.org.il

Commanders
- Commander of the Air Force: Aluf Omer Tischler

Insignia
- Roundel

- Flag

Aircraft flown
- Attack: Boeing F-15I Ra'am, AH-64D Saraf
- Fighter: McDonnell Douglas F-15 Eagle, General Dynamics F-16 Fighting Falcon, Lockheed Martin F-35 Lightning II
- Patrol: Eurocopter AS565 Panther
- Reconnaissance: IAI Eitam, Beechcraft RC-12D
- Trainer: Grob G-120, Beechcraft T-6 Texan II, Alenia Aermacchi M-346 Master, Beechcraft C-12 Huron, Bell 206
- Transport: Boeing 707-320, Lockheed C-130 Hercules, Sikorsky CH-53 Sea Stallion, Sikorsky S-70
- Tanker: Lockheed KC-130 Hercules, Boeing KC-707

The Israeli Air Force (IAF; Hebrew: זְרוֹעַ הָאֲוִיר וְהֶחָלָל, romanized: Zroa HaAvir VeHahalal, lit. 'Air and Space Arm', commonly known as חֵיל הָאֲוִיר, Kheil HaAvir, "Air Corps") operates as the aerial and space warfare branch of the Israel Defense Forces (IDF). It was founded on May 28, 1948, shortly after the Israeli Declaration of Independence. As of May 2026, Aluf Omer Tischler has been serving as the Air Force commander.

The Israeli Air Force was established using commandeered or donated civilian aircraft and obsolete and surplus World War II combat aircraft. Eventually, more aircraft were procured, including Boeing B-17s, Bristol Beaufighters, de Havilland Mosquitoes and P-51D Mustangs. The Israeli Air Force played an important part in Operation Kadesh, Israel's part in the 1956 Suez Crisis, dropping paratroopers at the Mitla Pass. On June 5, 1967, the first day of the Six-Day War, the Israeli Air Force performed Operation Focus, debilitating the opposing Arab air forces and attaining air supremacy for the remainder of the war.

Shortly after the end of the Six-Day War, Egypt initiated the War of Attrition, and the Israeli Air Force performed repeated bombings of strategic targets deep within enemy territory. When the Yom Kippur War broke out on October 6, 1973, Egyptian and Syrian advances forced the IAF to abandon detailed plans for the destruction of enemy air defences. Forced to operate under the missile and anti-aircraft artillery threats, the close air support it provided allowed Israeli troops on the ground to stem the tide and eventually go on the offensive.

Since that war most of Israel's military aircraft have been obtained from the United States. Among these are the A-4N Skyhawk, F-4E Phantom II, F-15C Eagle, F-15I Strike Eagle, F-16C/I Fighting Falcon and F-35I Lightning II. The Israeli Air Force has operated a number of domestically produced types such as the IAI Nesher, and later, the more advanced IAI Kfir. On June 7, 1981, eight IAF F-16s covered by six F-15s carried out Operation Opera to destroy the Iraqi nuclear facilities at Osiraq. On June 9, 1982, the Israeli Air Force carried out Operation Mole Cricket 19, crippling Syrian air defences in Lebanon. On October 1, 1985, In response to a PLO terrorist attack which murdered three Israeli civilians in Cyprus, the Israeli air force carried out Operation Wooden Leg, bombing the PLO Headquarters in Tunis. In 1991, the IAF carried out Operation Solomon which brought Ethiopian Jews to Israel. In 1993 and 1996, the IAF participated in Operation Accountability and Operation Grapes of Wrath, respectively. It has taken part in many operations since, including the 2006 Lebanon War, Operation Cast Lead, Operation Pillar of Cloud, Operation Protective Edge, Operation Guardian of the Walls and Operation Swords of Iron. On September 6, 2007, the Israeli Air Force successfully bombed an alleged Syrian nuclear reactor in Operation Orchard.

== Mission statement ==
The Israeli Air Force states the following as its functions:

1. To protect the State of Israel from aerial attack and to defend the IDF's zone of operations
2. To achieve air supremacy throughout the IDF's zone of operation
3. To participate in the fighting on both ground and sea
4. To hit targets deep in enemy territory
5. To create the aerial intelligence picture and participate in the creation of the general intelligence picture and its assessment
6. To transport troops, equipment and weapons systems
7. To carry out search, rescue and aerial evacuation missions
8. To execute special operations
9. To continually build and improve itself, as part of the general plan for improving the IDF and in accordance with the authority vested in it

== Insignia ==
The insignia / roundel of the Israeli Air Force consists of a blue Star of David on a white circle. Aircraft usually carry it painted in six positions – on the top and bottom of each wing, and on each side of the fuselage. A low-visibility variant – a blue Star of David without the white circle – exists, although its use is extremely rare. Squadron markings usually go on the tail fin.

== History ==
=== Early years (1948–1967) ===
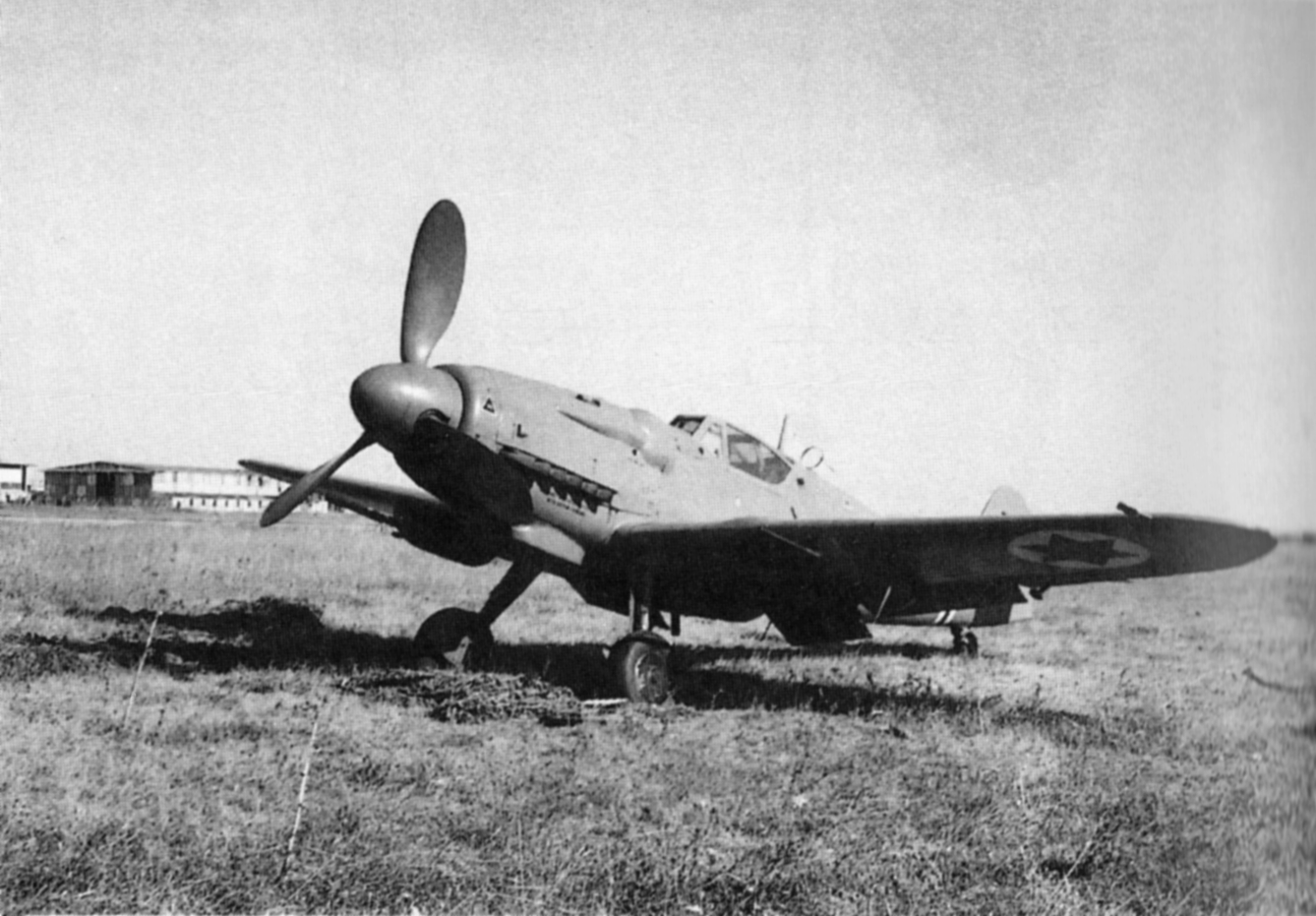
An Avia S-199

Forerunners of the Israeli Air Force were Sherut Avir, the air wing of the Haganah, established in 1947, which in turn grew out of the Palavir, the air wing of the Haganah's strike force, the Palmach, as well as the Palestine Flying Service established by the Irgun in 1937. During World War II, some Jews from Palestine who enlisted in the British military joined the Royal Air Force. They were primarily assigned to support roles. The RAF initially limited its acceptance of candidates from Palestine for pilot training but this restriction was eventually lifted and a small number of Palestinian Jews became pilots during the war. The experience these volunteers gained while serving in the RAF would help build the Israeli Air Force.

The Israeli Air Force formed on May 28, 1948, shortly after Israel declared statehood and found itself under attack. The force consisted of a hodge-podge of commandeered or donated civilian aircraft converted to military use. A variety of obsolete and surplus ex-World War II combat-aircraft were quickly sourced by various means to supplement this fleet. The backbone of the IAF consisted of 25 Avia S-199s purchased from Czechoslovakia, essentially Czechoslovak-built Messerschmitt Bf 109s, and 60 Supermarine Spitfire LF Mk IXEs, the first of which, "Israel 1", was locally assembled from British abandoned spare parts and a salvaged engine from an Egyptian Air Force Spitfire, with most of the rest purchased from Czechoslovakia. While the IAF did have a number of local pilots and support crews who had served in the RAF during World War II, it was heavily reliant on foreign Mahal volunteers who had served as aircrews in their countries' militaries during the war.

Israel's new fighter-arm first went into action on May 29, 1948, assisting efforts to halt the Egyptian advance from Gaza northwards.

On May 30, after un-assembled planes were strafed on the ground at Ekron airfield, the fighters were moved to makeshift strip located around the current Herzliya Airport. The airfield was used as it was a bit back from the front-lines, and was clandestine since it was a purpose-built strip, that was constructed after the beginning of hostilities, in between the orange orchards around Herzliya, and did not appear on published maps. The Israeli Air Force scored its first aerial victories on June 3 when Modi Alon, flying Avia D.112, shot down two Egyptian Air Force DC-3s which had just bombed Tel Aviv. The first dogfight against enemy fighters took place a few days later, on June 8, when Gideon Lichtaman shot down an Egyptian Spitfire.

During these initial operations, the squadron operated with a few planes versus almost complete Arab theater air supremacy. The airplanes were parked dispersed between the orange trees. The fighters were moved in October to Hatzor Airbase from the Herzliya strip due to its unsuitability in rainy conditions, probable loss of clandestine status, moving front lines which made former British bases safe for use, and a shift in the balance of air superiority towards the Israelis.

=== Suez Crisis (1956) ===
The Israeli Air Force played an important part in Operation Kadesh, Israel's part in the 1956 Suez Crisis. At the launch of the operation, on October 29, Israeli P-51D Mustangs, some using their propeller blades, severed telephone lines in the Sinai. 16 IAF DC-3s – escorted by fighters – dropped Israeli paratroopers behind Egyptian lines at the Mitla Pass and Et-Tur. The Israeli Air Force conducted attacks on Egyptian ground units and assisted the Israeli Navy in capturing the Egyptian Navy destroyer Ibrahim el Awal, which had bombarded the Israeli city of Haifa – an airstrike damaged the Egyptian ship's engines, enabling Israeli ships to reach it and capture it.

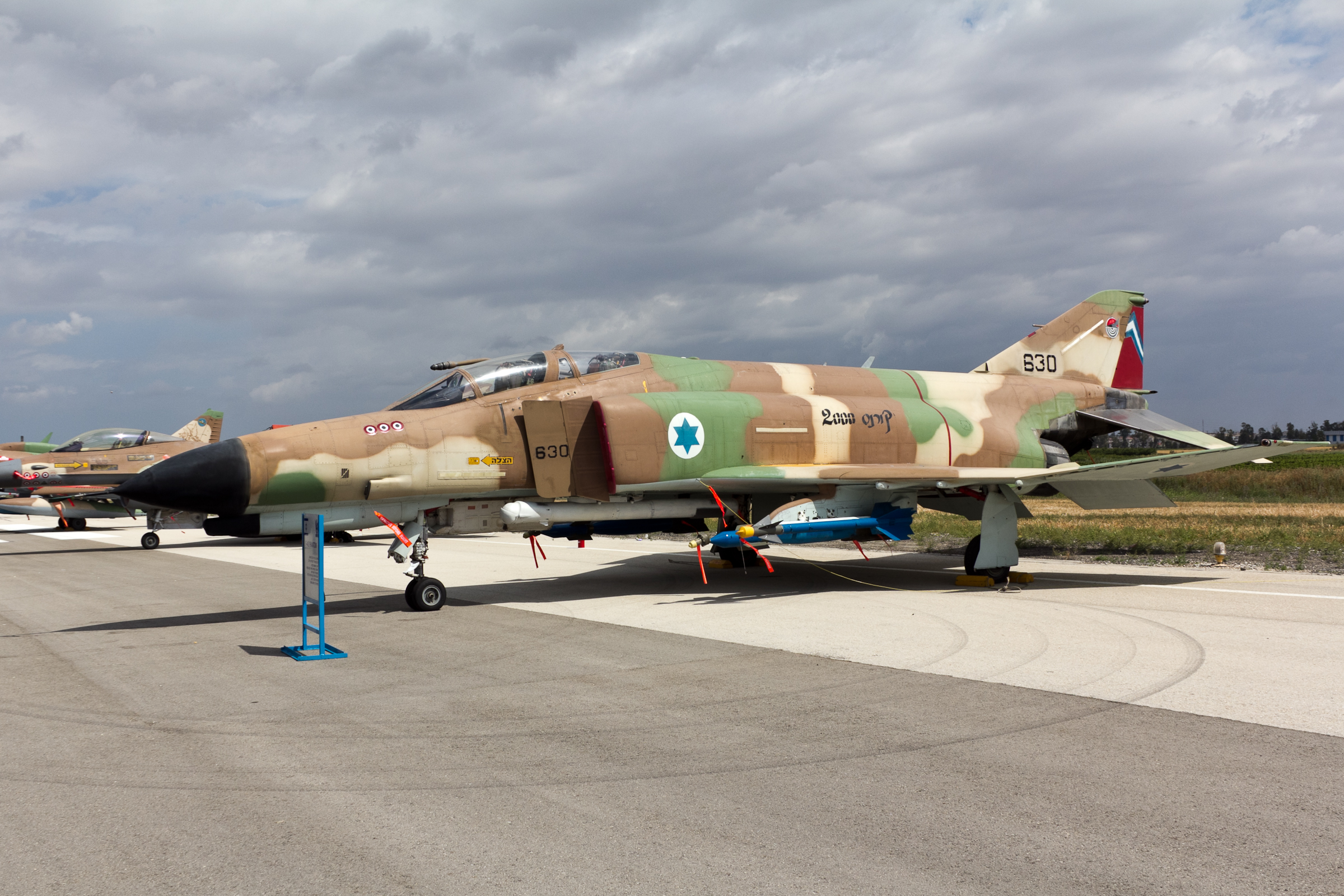
201 Squadron IAF F-4E Phantom II with 3 kill markings

=== Six-Day War (1967) ===
In three hours on the morning of June 5, 1967, the first day of the Six-Day War, the Israeli Air Force executed Operation Focus, crippling the opposing Arab air forces and attaining air supremacy for the remainder of the war. In a surprise attack, the IAF destroyed most of the Egyptian Air Force while its planes were still on the ground. By the end of the day, with surrounding Arab countries drawn into the fighting, the IAF had mauled the Syrian and Jordanian air forces, striking as far as Iraq. After six days of fighting, Israel claimed a total of 452 Arab aircraft destroyed, of which 49 were aerial victories.

After the IAF's impressive performance in the Six-Day War, the Lyndon Johnson administration decided to sell F-4 Phantom fighters to Israel in 1968, marking the first sale of American military equipment to Israel.

=== War of Attrition ===
Shortly after the end of the Six-Day War, Egypt initiated the War of Attrition, hoping to prevent Israel from consolidating its hold over the lands captured in 1967. Israel's goal in the fighting was to exact heavy losses on the opposing side, in order to facilitate a ceasefire. The Israeli Air Force undertook repeated bombings of strategic targets deep within enemy territory and repeatedly challenged Arab air forces for aerial supremacy, while supporting operations by Israel's ground and naval forces.

In late 1969 the Soviet Union began to deploy fighter aircraft units and surface-to-air missile units to Egypt. The Soviet surface-to-air missile units soon joined their Egyptian allies in direct confrontations with Israeli aircraft. Soviet fighters conducted patrols, but Israeli pilots were ordered not to engage them. On July 30, 1970, the tension peaked: An IAF ambush resulted in a large scale air brawl between IAF planes and MiGs flown by Soviet pilots—five MiGs were shot down, while the IAF suffered no losses.

Fear of further escalation and superpower involvement brought the war to a conclusion. By the end of August 1970, the Israeli Air Force had claimed 111 aerial kills while reporting losing only four aircraft to Arab fighters. Egyptian and Soviet forces claimed to shoot down approximately 20 Israeli Air Force planes with surface-to-air missile and anti-aircraft artillery units.

=== Yom Kippur War (1973) ===
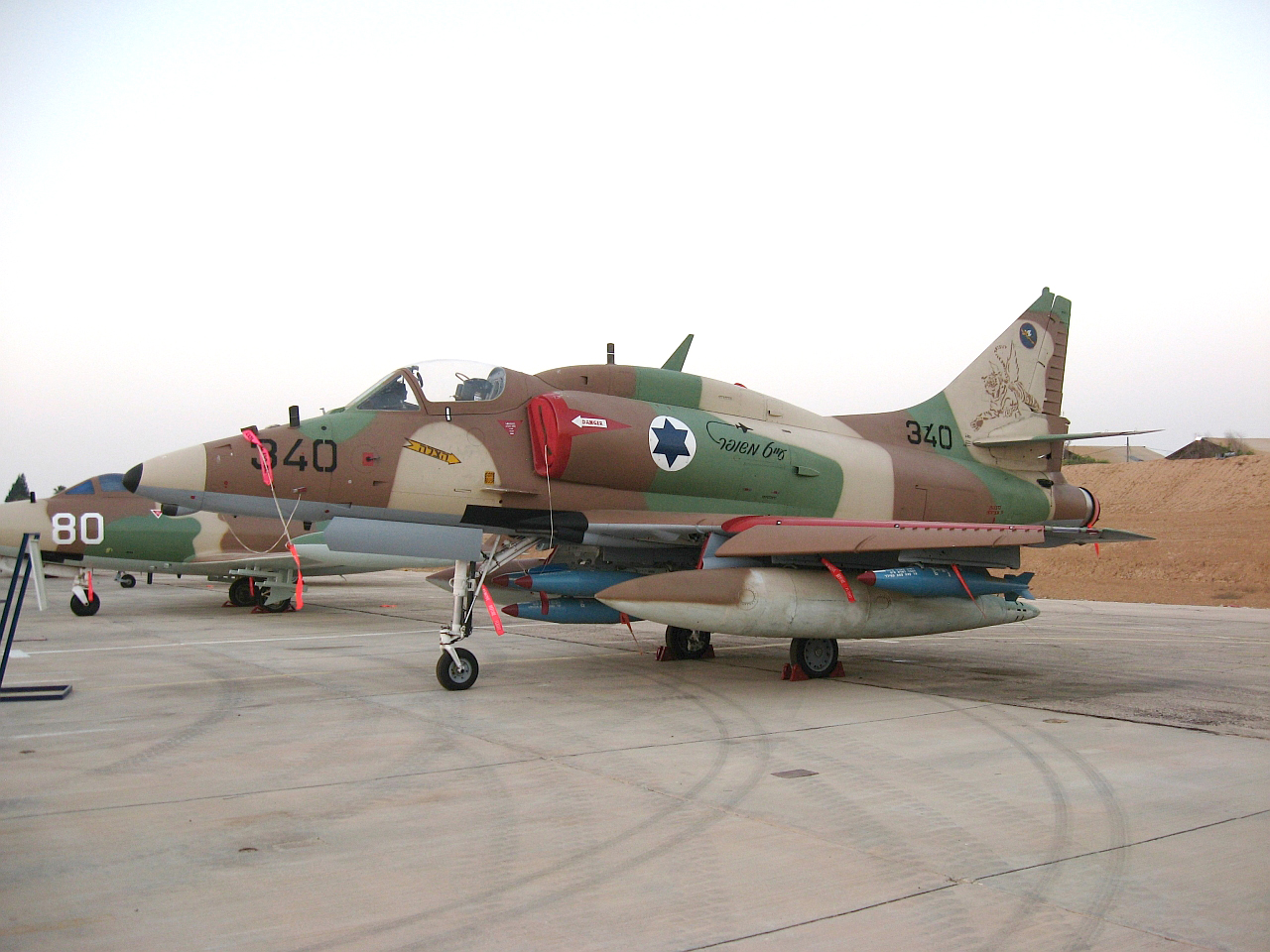
An Israeli Air Force A-4N Skyhawk of 102 Squadron "Flying Tiger"

On October 6, 1973, with war imminent, the IAF began preparing for a pre-emptive strike against Egyptian and Syrian airfields and anti-aircraft positions. The Israeli government decided against pre-emption. IAF aircraft were therefore in the process of re-armament to the air-to-air role when Yom Kippur War hostilities began at 14:00. The next morning began with Operation Tagar, a SEAD offensive against Egyptian air defences, beginning with strikes against Egyptian air bases. Tagar was quickly discontinued when the dire situation on the Golan Heights became apparent.

IAF efforts were redirected north, where the ill-fated Operation Model 5 was carried out. Flying with outdated intelligence and no electronic screening against mobile SAM batteries and heavy flak, 6 IAF Phantoms were lost. The sustained campaign required to defeat enemy air defences was abandoned in the face of Egyptian and Syrian advances and the IAF was forced to operate under the SAM threat. Nevertheless, the close air support it provided allowed Israeli troops on the ground to stem the tide and eventually go on the offensive, first in the north and later in the south.

After the failure of the Israeli counter-offensive in the Sinai on October 8, the southern front remained relatively static and the IAF focused its attention on the Syrian front. While A-4 Skyhawks provided much needed support to troops on the ground, at the cost of 31 aircraft by the end of fourth day of the war, IAF Phantoms repeatedly struck Syrian air fields. Following Syrian FROG-7 strikes on military and civilian targets in northern Israel, the IAF initiated a campaign to destroy the infrastructure on which Syria's war-making capacity depended, targeting strategic targets in Syria such as its oil industry and electricity generating system. By October 13 the Syrians had been pushed back and beyond their initial lines, Damascus had come within range of Israeli artillery and an Iraqi armored brigade, the vanguard of its expeditionary force, was destroyed.

On October 14 the Egyptian army launched an offensive along the entire front but was repulsed by the IDF. Israel followed on this success by attacking at the seam between the 2nd and 3rd Egyptian armies and crossing the Suez Canal into Egypt. Israeli forces fanned north and south, destroying Egyptian rear units and punching holes through its air defence array. This allowed the IAF the freedom of action it was previously denied and renewed attacks led to the collapse of the Egyptian Air Defence Force. This prompted increased diplomatic activity to resolve the war, coupled with increased activity by the Egyptian Air Force. From about October 18 to the end of the war, intensive air battles took place between Israeli and Egyptian aircraft.

Official Israeli Air Force losses of the Yom Kippur War were 102 aircraft, including 32 F-4 Phantoms, 53 A-4 Skyhawks, 11 Dassault Mirages, and 6 IAI Sa'ars, although other accounts suggest as many as 128 Israeli aircraft were lost. 91 air force personnel, of which 53 were airmen, were killed. 172 Egyptian aircraft were shot down in air-to-air combat, for a loss of between 5 and 21 for the Israelis, on all fronts. No official numbers were released on the Arab side, though total Egyptian losses were between 235 and 242 aircraft. Syria lost between 135 and 179.

=== Expansion (1973–1982) ===
Since the war, most of Israel's military aircraft have been obtained from the United States. Among these are the F-4 Phantom II, A-4 Skyhawk, F-15 Eagle and F-16 Fighting Falcon. The Israeli Air Force has operated a number of domestically produced types such as the IAI Nesher, and later, the more advanced IAI Kfir, which were derivatives of the French Dassault Mirage 5. The Kfir was adapted to utilize a more powerful U.S. engine, produced under license in Israel. On July 4, 1976, four Israeli C-130 Hercules transport aircraft secretly flew to Entebbe Airport for a rescue operation. In March 1978, the Israeli Air Force participated in Operation Litani.

On June 7, 1981, eight IAF F-16A fighters covered by six F-15A jets carried out Operation Opera to destroy the Iraqi nuclear facilities at Osiraq. Among the pilots who took part in the attack was Ilan Ramon, later Israel's first astronaut.

=== 1982 Lebanon War and aftermath ===
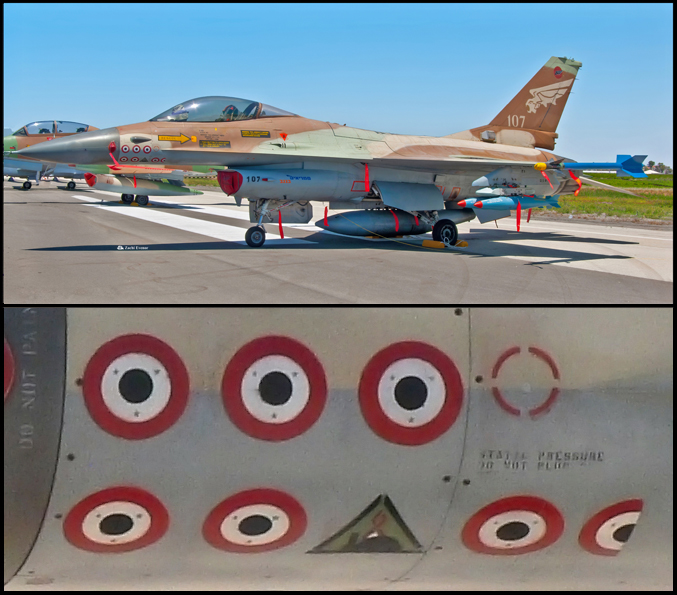
An F-16A Netz #107 of 116 Squadron "Defenders Of The South" with 7.5 kill marks, including the triangle symbol for Operation Opera

Prior to the 1982 Lebanon War, Syria, with the help of the Soviet Union, had built up an overlapping network of surface-to-air missiles in Lebanon's Beqaa Valley. On June 9, 1982, the IAF carried out Operation Mole Cricket 19, crippling the Syrian air defence array. In subsequent aerial battles against the Syrian Air Force, the IAF managed to shoot down 86 Syrian aircraft without losing a single fighter plane in an air-to-air combat. IAF AH-1 Cobra helicopter gunships destroyed dozens of Syrian armored fighting vehicles and other ground targets, including some T-72 main battle tanks.

In the decades since the war's official conclusion (including the conflict that followed), the IAF has regularly conducted air strikes against targets in Southern Lebanon, namely Hezbollah positions.

On October 1, 1985, the IAF carried out Operation Wooden Leg, which involved the bombing of the PLO Headquarters near Tunis. This was the longest combat mission ever undertaken by the IAF, traversing 2,300 kilometers.

=== 1990s and beyond ===
In 1991, the IAF carried out Operation Solomon which brought Ethiopian Jews to Israel. In 1993 and 1996, the IAF participated in Operation Accountability and Operation Grapes of Wrath, respectively.

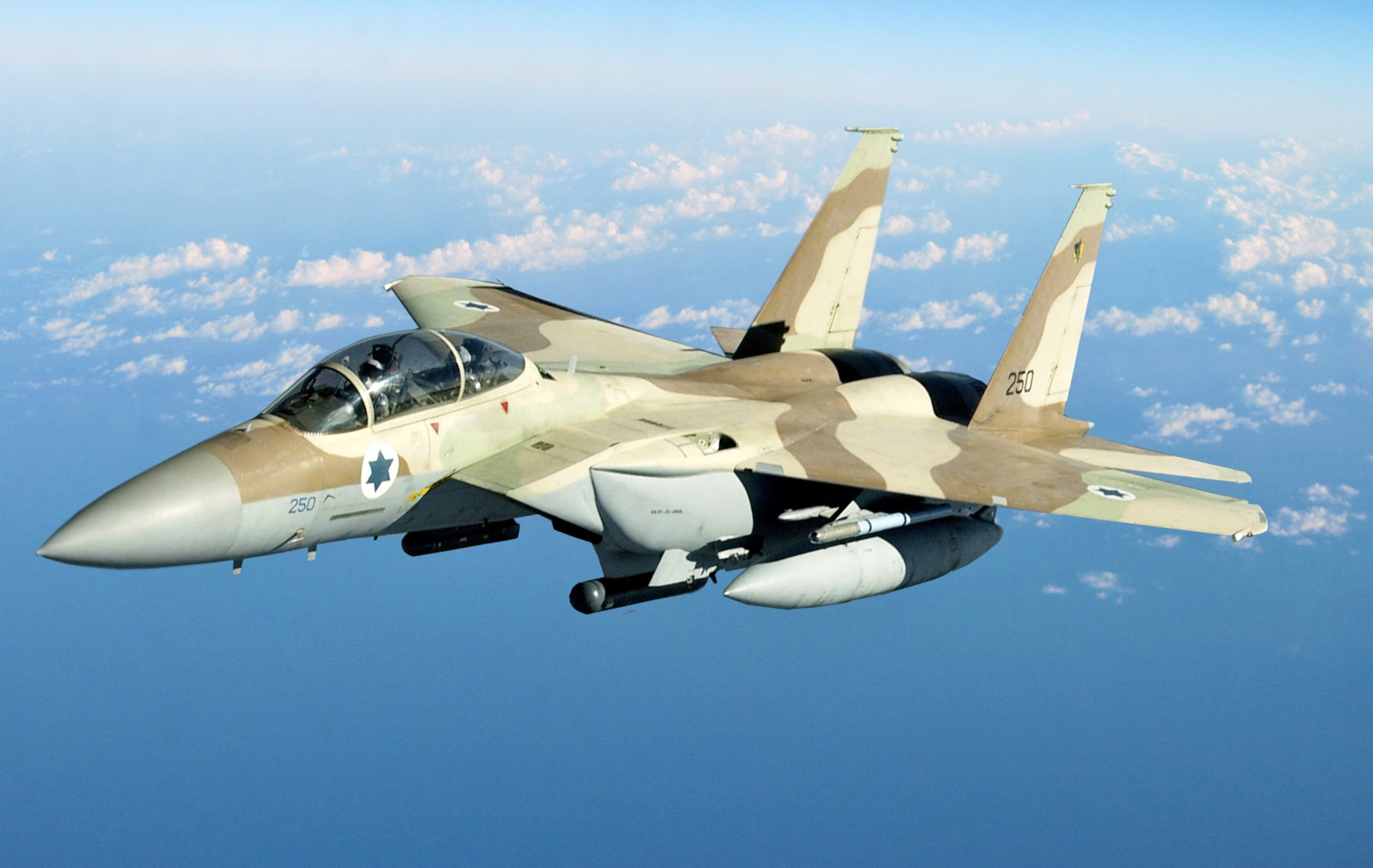
69 Squadron F-15I Ra'ams at Red Flag 04-3

In the late 1990s, the IAF began acquiring the F-15I Ra'am (Thunder) and the F-16I Sufa (Storm), manufactured specially for Israel according to IAF requirements. The first of 102 F-16I Sufas arrived in April 2004, joining an F-16 fleet that had already been the largest outside the US Air Force. The IAF also purchased the advanced Israeli air-to-air missile Rafael Python 5, with full-sphere capability, as well as a special version of the Apache Longbow, designated AH-64DI or Saraph. In 2005 the Israeli Air Force received modified Gulfstream V jets ("Nachshon"), equipped with advanced intelligence systems made by Israel Military Industries. By 2013 Israel became the world's largest exporter of drones. In December 2016, Israel received its first pair of F-35 Lightning II from the United States.

Three months after the assassination of the leader of Hezbollah, Abbas al-Musawi, the IAF launched an offensive across South Lebanon with five air raids in six days. Some of the targets struck were as far north as Baalbek. On the final day, 26 May 1992, there were more than 40 missile strikes. Over 20 civilians were killed during the attacks.

The Israeli Air Force took an extensive part in IDF operations during the al-Aqsa Intifada, including the controversial targeted killings of Palestinian terrorist leaders, most notably Salah Shakhade, Ahmed Yassin and Abed al-Aziz Rantissi. While this policy was criticized due to the collateral damage caused in certain instances, Israel claims it is vital in its fight against terrorism and that IAF pilots do whatever they can to avoid civilian casualties, including aborting strikes. In 2007, Israel achieved a civilian casualty ratio of 1:30, or one civilian casualty for every thirty combatant casualties, in its airstrikes on militants in the Palestinian territories. Alan Dershowitz noted that "No army in history has ever had a better ratio of combatants to civilians killed in a comparable setting".

=== 2006 Lebanon War ===
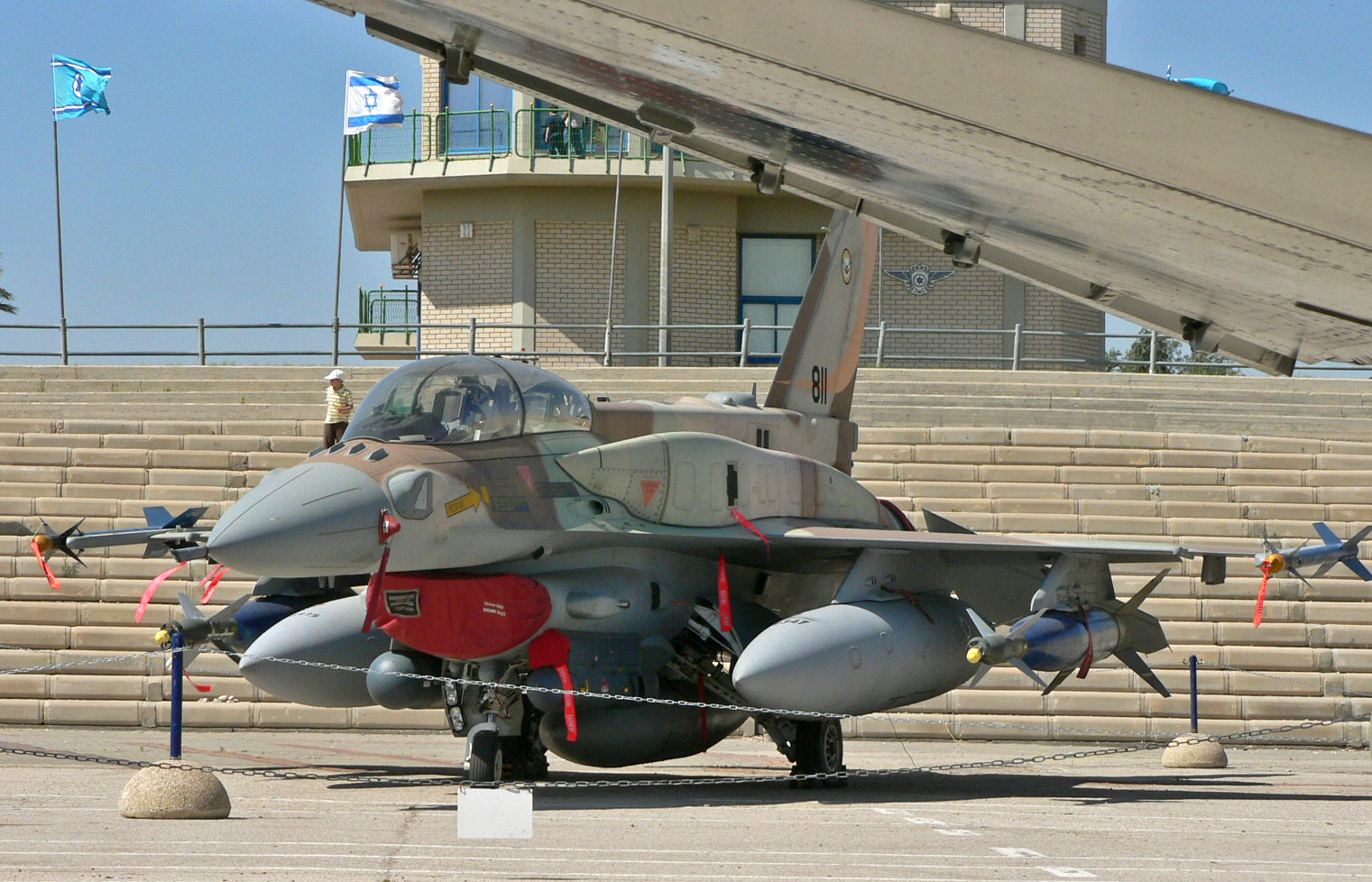
Israeli Air Force F-16I Sufa carried out many airstrikes during the Second Lebanon War.

The IAF played a critical role in the 2006 Lebanon War. IAF strikes—mainly, though not exclusively, in southern Lebanon—were aimed at stopping rocket launches by Hezbollah's militia targeting Israeli towns. The IAF flew more than 12,000 combat missions during this war. The most notable, taking place during the second day of the war, resulted in the IAF destroying 59 Iranian-supplied medium- and long-range missile launchers in just 34 minutes.

Widespread condemnation followed the July 30 IAF airstrike on a building suspected to be a militant hideout near the village of Qana, in which 28 civilians were killed. Hezbollah shot down an IAF CH-53 Yas'ur helicopter on the last day of the war, killing five crew members. Israeli aircraft shot down three of Hezbollah's Iranian-made aerial drones during the conflict.

=== 2007 Operation Outside the Box ===
In the 2007 Operation Outside the Box, the Israeli Air Force attacked a suspected Syrian nuclear weapons site. The IAF used electronic warfare (EW) system to neutralize Syria's air defenses, feeding them a false sky-picture while IAF jets crossed much of Syria, bombed their targets and returned to Israel unchallenged.

=== Operations in Gaza ===
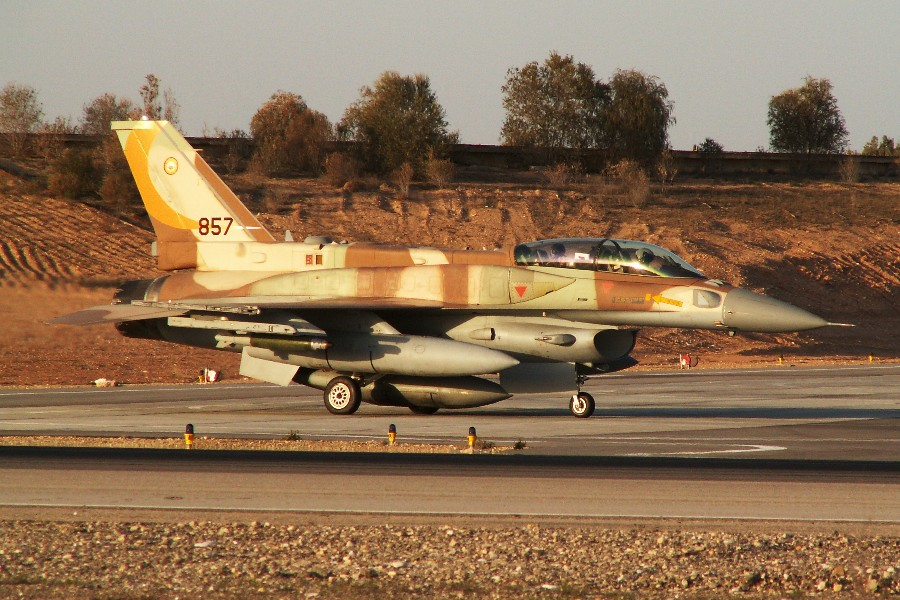
Israeli Air Force F-16I Sufa preparing for take off to strike Hamas targets, during Operation Cast Lead (2008–2009).

Since Hamas' takeover of Gaza in 2007, the Israeli Air Force has taken part in repeated bouts of violence between Israel and the Hamas-held Gaza Strip. In December 2008, the IAF spearheaded Operation Cast Lead, carrying out more than 2,360 air strikes. It had a principal role in destroying Hamas targets, and killed several senior Hamas commanders, including Said Seyam, Nizar Rayan, Tawfik Jaber, and Abu Zakaria al-Jamal.

According to a CBS news report, in January 2009 Israeli planes struck a convoy of trucks in Sudan headed for Egypt and carrying weapons apparently meant for the Gaza Strip. Seventeen trucks were bombed, and thirty-nine smugglers were killed in the strike. On April 5, 2011, a car driving from Port Sudan Airport to Port Sudan was destroyed by a missile. Both passengers were killed. one of whom may have been a senior Hamas military commander. The Sudanese Foreign Minister blamed the attack on Israel. Sudanese newspapers reported that Israeli aircraft attacked Gaza-bound arms convoys again in late 2011. On October 24, 2012, Sudan claimed that Israel had bombed a munitions factory south of Khartoum.

The Israeli Air Force also operates surface-to-air missile and anti-aircraft artillery units. Since 1990 their primary role has been the interception of surface-to-surface missiles and rockets fired into Israel. In 2011 the IAF began operating the 'Iron Dome' anti-rocket missile system, which within a year had successfully intercepted and destroyed 93 rockets fired at Israeli towns from Gaza.

In November 2012, the IAF participated in Operation Pillar of Defense, during which, according to the IDF Spokesperson, Israeli forces targeted more than 1,500 military sites in Gaza Strip, including rocket launching pads, smuggling tunnels, command centers, and weapons manufacturing and storage facilities. Many of these attacks were carried out by the Air Force.

Between July 8 and August 5, 2014, the IAF participated in Operation Protective Edge, during which, according to the IDF Spokesperson, Israeli forces targeted 4,762 terror sites across the Gaza Strip, including rocket launching sites, command and control centers, military administration facilities, weapons storage and manufacturing facilities and training and military compounds.

In May 2021, Israeli artillery and air force carried out 1,500 strikes on Gaza during Operation Guardian of the Walls. Starting in October 2023, the Israeli Air Force fulfilled a main role in the Gaza war.

=== Syrian Civil War ===
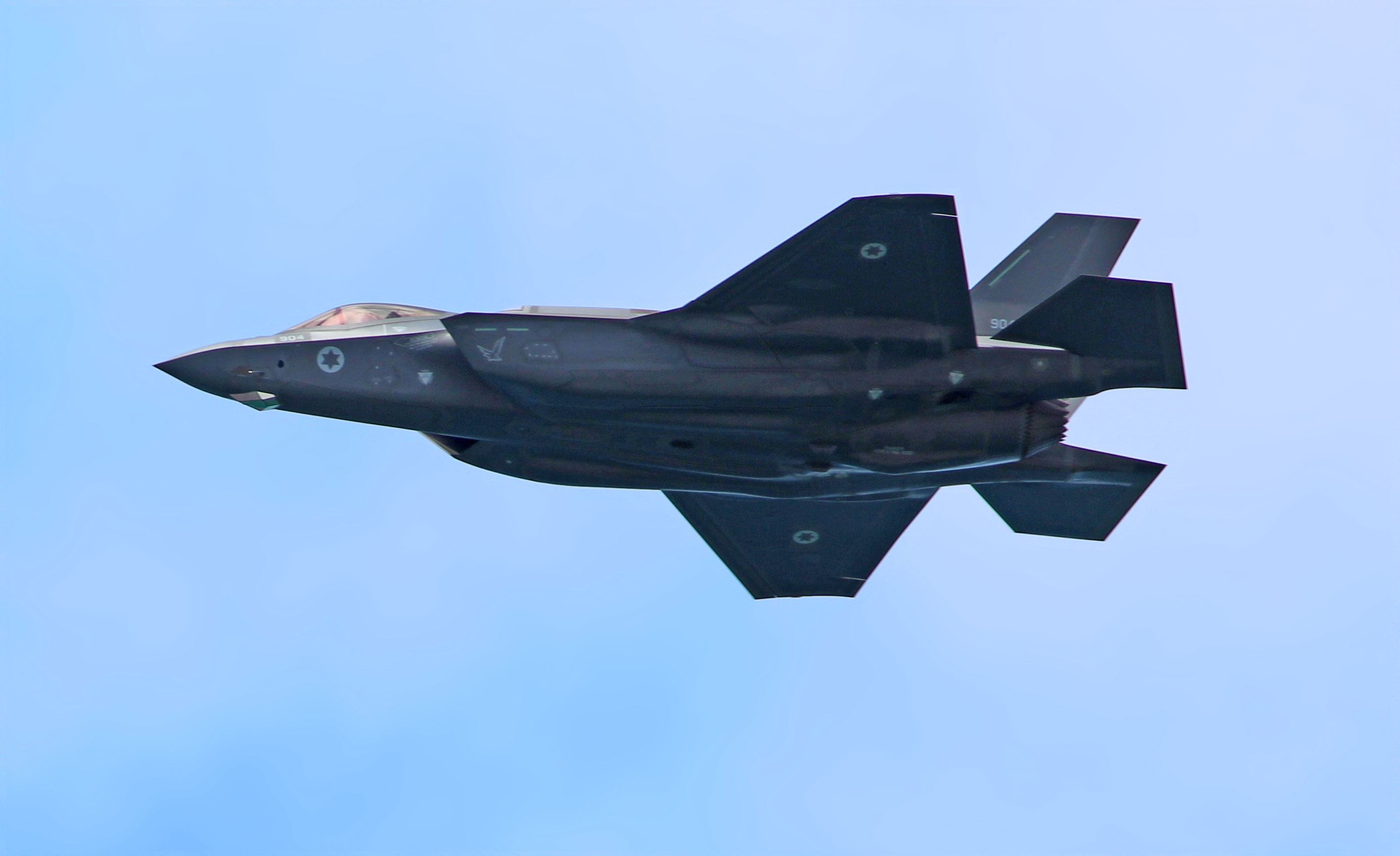
The F-35I Adir recorded its first operational strike, targeting Iranian military facilities in Syria during 2018's clashes. The F-35I also recorded the first operational shoot down for the F-35, intercepting two Iranian drones in 2021.

The civil war raging within Israel's northern neighbor, has occasionally witnessed activity by the IAF, some overt, some unacknowledged and some merely attributed. Notable actions include:

- The downing of a Syrian Air Force Sukhoi Su-24 on September 23, 2014: The aircraft was shot down by an IAF MIM-104 Patriot air defense battery, after allegedly crossing the Syrian-Israeli ceasefire line during a ground attack mission against Syrian opposition forces.
- On August 20 and 21, 2015, after four rockets hit the Golan Heights and Upper Galilee, Israel launched airstrikes in Syria, killing several militants.
- The March 2017 Israeli airstrikes in Syria: On March 17, 2017, Israeli jet fighters attacked targets in Syria. Several S-200 missiles were fired at the jets, and one missile was shot down by an Arrow 2 missile; no aircraft were damaged. The incident was the first clearly confirmed Israeli strike on Syrian territory during the Syrian Civil War.
- On February 10, 2018, an Israeli AH-64 shot down an Iranian drone that entered Israel. 4 Israeli F-16's launched a strike into Syria while remaining in Israeli airspace, reportedly to strike Iranian drone control facilities, conducting a cross-border raid. One of the F-16s was shot down by Syrian surface to air missiles and crashed in northern Israel, the first Israeli jet to be shot down in combat since 1982. Both pilots managed to eject in Israeli territory. The pilots were injured but walked out of hospital around a week later. Israel subsequently attacked Syrian air defenses and Iranian targets.
- On May 10, 2018, after Iranian elite forces on the Syrian-held side of the Golan Heights fired around 20 rockets towards Israeli army positions without causing damage or injuries, Israel responded with rounds of rocket fire into Syria. The Israeli Air Force confirmed the strikes. Twenty-three fighters, among them 18 foreigners, were killed. IAF commander Amikam Norkin said Israel used its F-35 stealth fighters for the first time.
- On September 17, 2018, Syrian media reported several explosions over the city of Latakia after allegedly intercepting missiles fired from the Mediterranean Sea. Israel assumed responsibility for the attack on Latakia, following the shoot down of a Russian reconnaissance plane by Syrian air defense systems. SANA news agency claimed ten people were injured by the Israeli attack. The Syrian Observatory for Human Rights reported two Syrian soldiers died, while 113 Iranian soldiers have been killed during the past month as a result of Israeli strikes in Syria.

=== 2023–2025 Gaza war ===
In the Israel–Gaza war beginning in October 2023, the IAF played a major role through its bombing of Gaza and subsequent support for ground troops in the ensuing invasion of the Gaza Strip.

=== Operation Roaring Lion (2026) ===
The Israeli Air Force said it used approximately 200 fighter jets on 28 February 2026, during the opening strikes of Operation Roaring Lion, in what it described as the largest strike sortie in its history. 500+ targets were struck by this sortie during the morning hours.

== Organization ==
Order of Battle

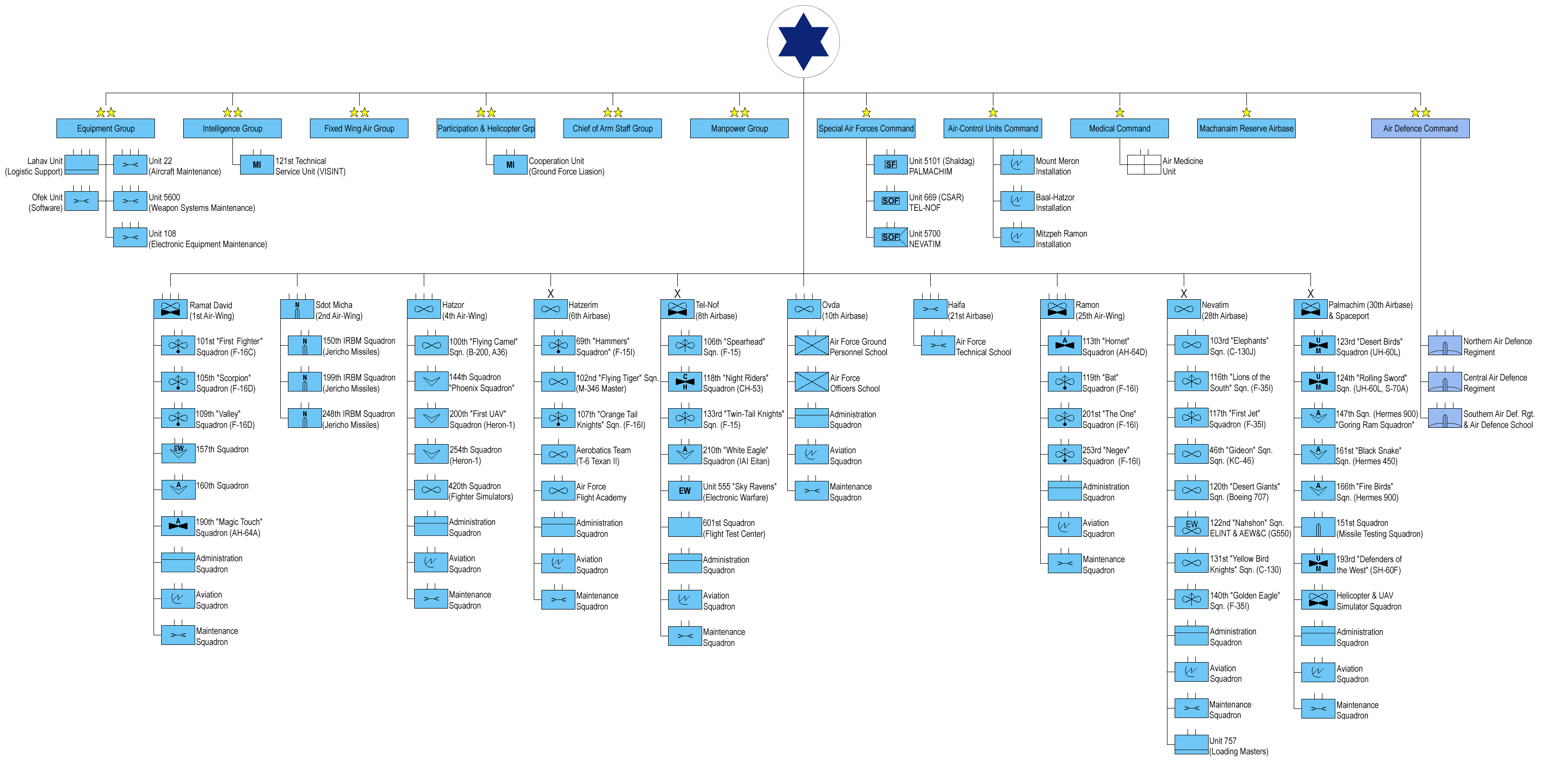

=== Administrative organization ===
Israeli Air Force air bases (blue)
- Chief of Air Staff Group
- Fixed Wing Group
- Joint Warfare and Borders Group
- Intelligence Group
- Equipment Group
- Manpower Group
- Chief Medical Officer
- Air Defense Command
  - Air Defense School 883
- Air Traffic control Commend

=== Operational organization ===
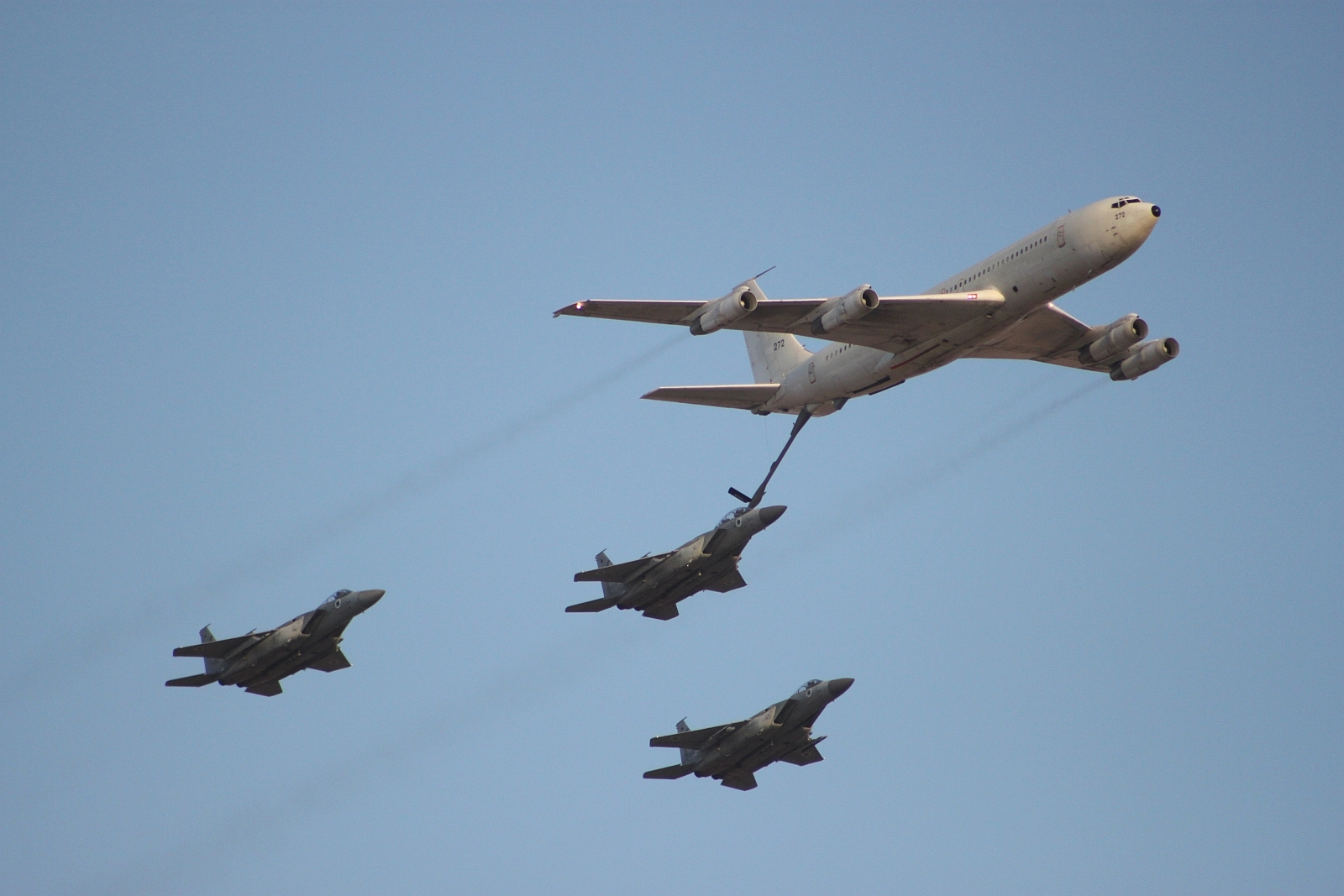
IAF Boeing 707 refueling F-15s

- Ramat David Airbase (Wing 1)
  - 101 "First Fighter" Squadron
  - 105 "Scorpion" Squadron
  - 109 "Valley" Squadron
  - 157 "Squadron in the valley"
  - 160 "Shadow Hunters" Squadron
  - 190 "Magic Touch" Squadron
- Sdot Micha Airbase (Wing 2)
  - 150 Squadron
  - 199 Squadron
  - 248 Squadron
- Hatzor Airbase (Wing 4)
  - 100 "Flying Camel" Squadron
  - 144 "Phoenix" Squadron
  - 200 "First UAV" Squadron
  - 254 "Midland" Squadron
- Hatzerim Airbase (Air Force Base 6)
  - 69 "Hammers" Squadron
  - 102 "Flying Tiger" Squadron
  - IAF Aerobatic Team
  - 107 "Knights of the Orange Tail" Squadron
  - Air Force Infantry School
- 7th wing
  - Shaldag – air force special operations unit
  - Unit 669 – medevac extraction unit
  - Unit 5700 – Aerodrome establishment and organisation unit
- Tel Nof Airbase (Air Force Base 8)
  - 106 "Spearhead" Squadron
  - 118 "Night Riders" Squadron
  - 133 "Knight of the Twin Tail" Squadron
  - 210 "White Eagle" Squadron
  - 601 Squadron (Flight Test Center)
  - Unit 555 "Sky Crows" (electronic warfare unit)
- Ovda Airbase (Air Force Base 10)
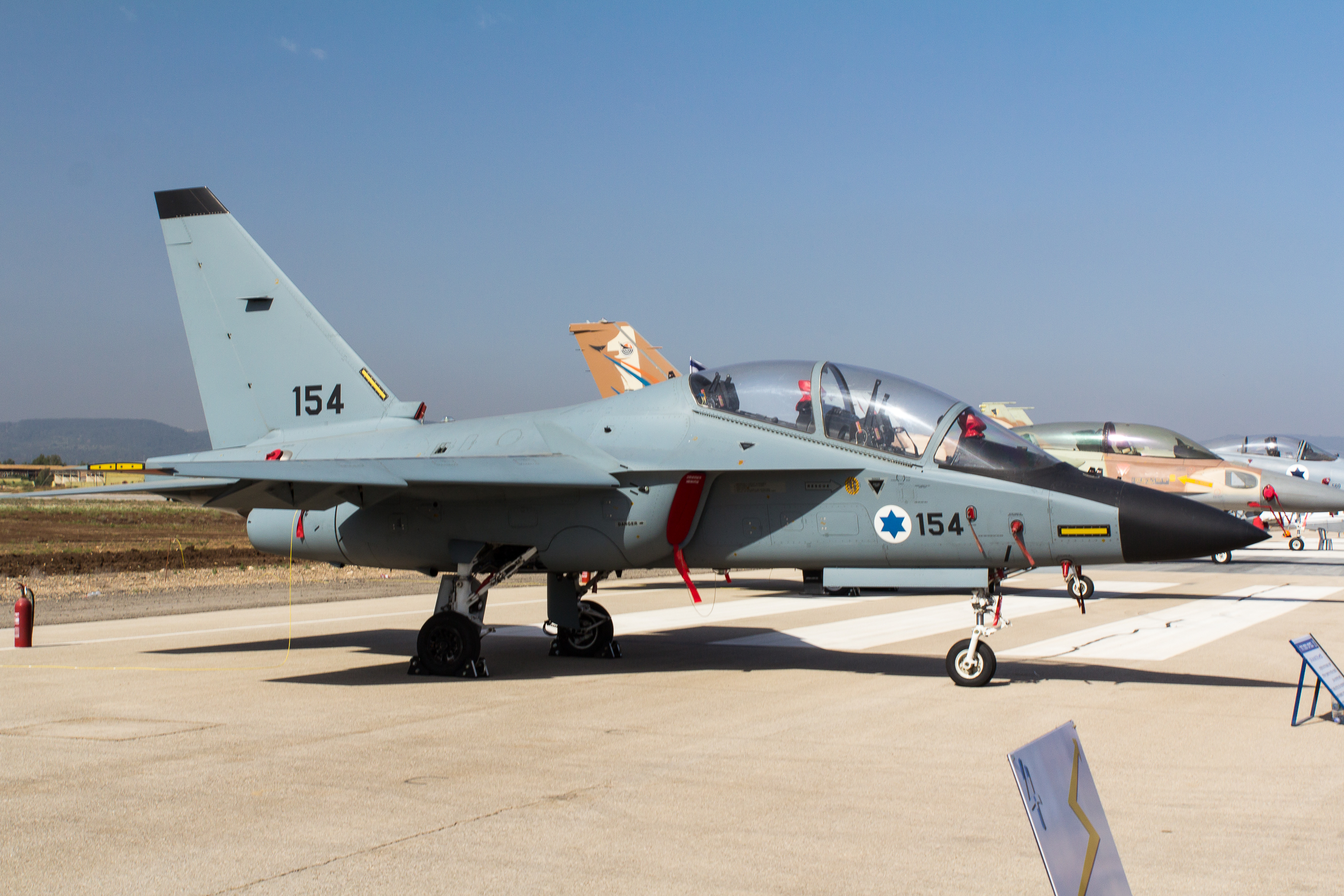
  An M-346 'Lavi' in IAF service.
  - Aviation Professions School
  - Air Force Officers School
- Haifa Airbase (Air Force Base 21)
  - Technical Professions School
  - IAF Technological College
- Ramon Airbase (Wing 25)
  - 113 "Hornet" Squadron
  - 119 "Bat" Squadron
  - 201 "The One" Squadron
  - 253 "Negev" Squadron
- Nevatim Airbase (Air Force Base 28)
  - 103 "Elephants" Squadron
  - 116 "Lions of the South" Squadron
  - 117 "First Jet" Squadron
  - 120 "Desert Giants" Squadron

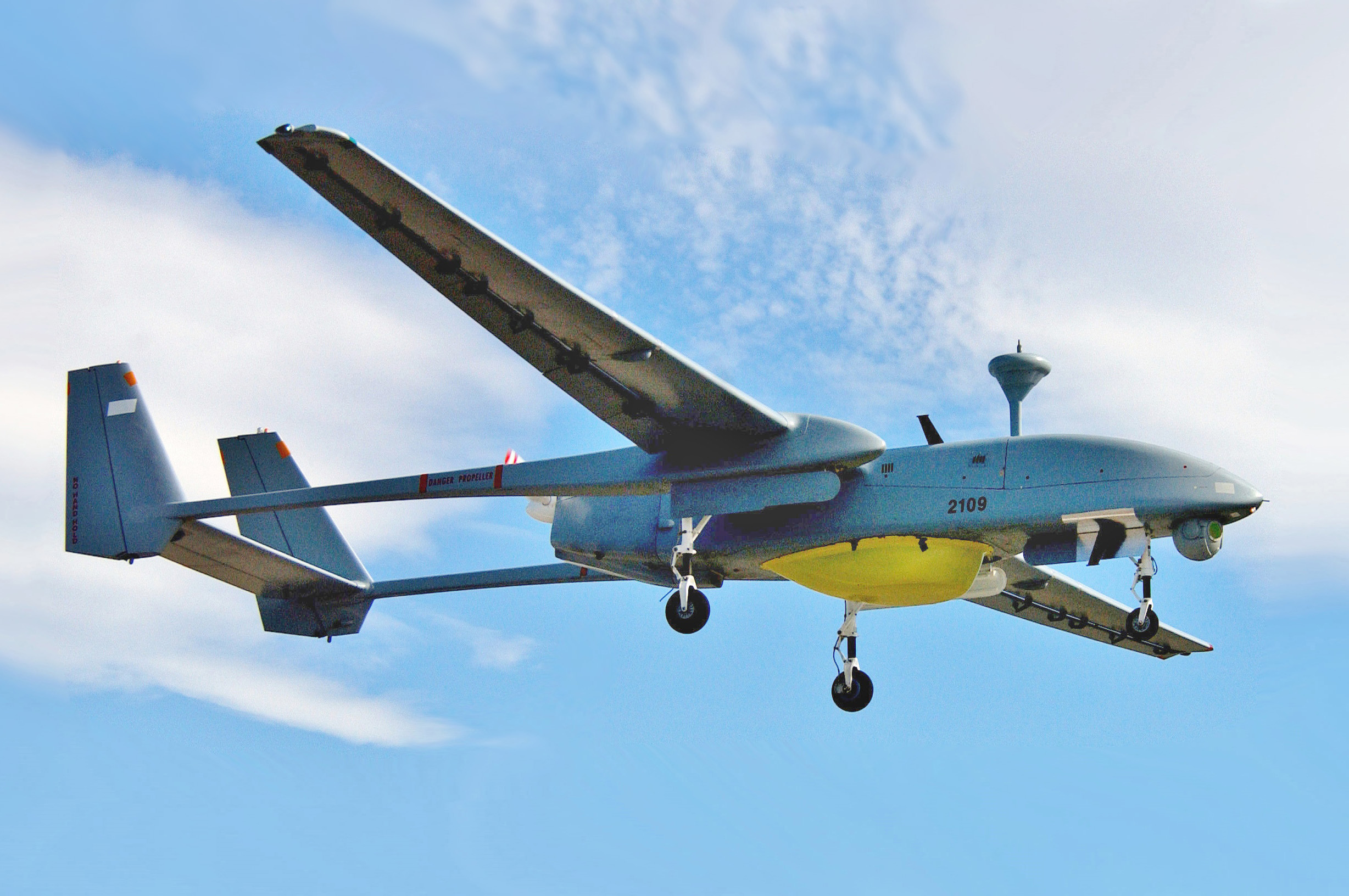
A IAF Heron UAV in flight

  - 122 "Nahshon" Squadron
  - 131 "Knights of the Yellow Bird" Squadron
  - 140 "Golden Eagle" Squadron
- Palmachim Airbase (Air Force Base 30)
  - 123 "Desert Birds" Squadron
  - 124 "Rolling Sword" Squadron
  - 147 "Goring Ram" Squadron
  - 151 Squadron (Missile Testing Squadron)
  - 161 "Black Snake" Squadron
  - 166 "Spark" Squadron
  - 193 "Defenders of the West" Squadron

== Aircraft ==
=== Current inventory ===
Aircraft	Origin	Type	Variant	In service	Notes
Combat aircraft
F-15 Eagle	United States	Multirole	F-15A/C	66	F-15C/D MSIP II
F-15E Strike Eagle	United States	Multirole	F-15I	66	
F-15EX Eagle II	United States	Multirole	F-15IA		50 on order.
F-16 Fighting Falcon	United States	Multirole	F-16C/I	173	F-16C Block 40 and F-16I Block 52+
F-35 Lightning II	United States	Stealth multirole	F-35I	48	52 on order.
Airborne early warning and control
Boeing 707	United States / Israel	Airborne early warning and control	EL/M-2075 Phalcon	2	
Gulfstream G550	United States	Airborne early warning and control	CAEW	2	Equipped with the IAI EL/W-2085 radar. 1 on order.
Reconnaissance
Super King Air	United States	SIGINT / ELINT	B200	13	
Gulfstream G550	United States	SIGINT / surveillance	SEMA	4	1 used for reconnaissance.
Tanker
Boeing 707	United States	Aerial refueling	KC-707-300	7	1 used for transport.
KC-46 Pegasus	United States	Aerial refueling / Transport	KC-46A	2	4 more on order.
KC-130 Hercules	United States	Aerial refueling / Transport	KC-130H	7	
Transport
Super King Air	United States	Utility / Transport	B200	5	Two provide multi-engine training.
C-130 Hercules	United States	Transport / Search and rescue	C-130E/H	1	
C-130J Super Hercules	United States	Tactical airlift	C-130J-30	7	
Helicopters
AH-64 Apache	United States	Attack	AH-64A/D	48	30 AH-64E on order. 12 AH-64E ordered in October 2026.
Sikorsky UH-60	United States	Utility	UH-60A/L	49	1 lost in 2026.
Sikorsky CH-53	United States	Heavy lift	S-65C-3	21	12 CH-53K on order.
Trainer aircraft
M-346 Lavi	Italy	Advanced trainer	M-346i	30	
F-15 Eagle	United States	Conversion trainer	F-15B/D	21	
F-16 Fighting Falcon	United States	Conversion trainer	F-16D	49	Block 40
T-6 Texan II	United States	Intermediate trainer	T-6A	20	
Grob G 120	Germany	Basic trainer	G 120A-1	16	
AgustaWestland AW119	Italy	Rotorcraft trainer	AW119Kx	8	4 on order.
Unmanned aerial vehicles
IAI Eitan	Israel	Surveillance	Heron-TP		Medium-altitude long-endurance unmanned aerial vehicle
IAI Heron	Israel	Surveillance	Heron-1		Medium-altitude long-endurance unmanned aerial vehicle
Hermes 900	Israel	Surveillance			Medium-altitude long-endurance unmanned aerial vehicle
Hermes 450	Israel	Surveillance			Tactical
Orbiter 4	Israel	Surveillance			Tactical

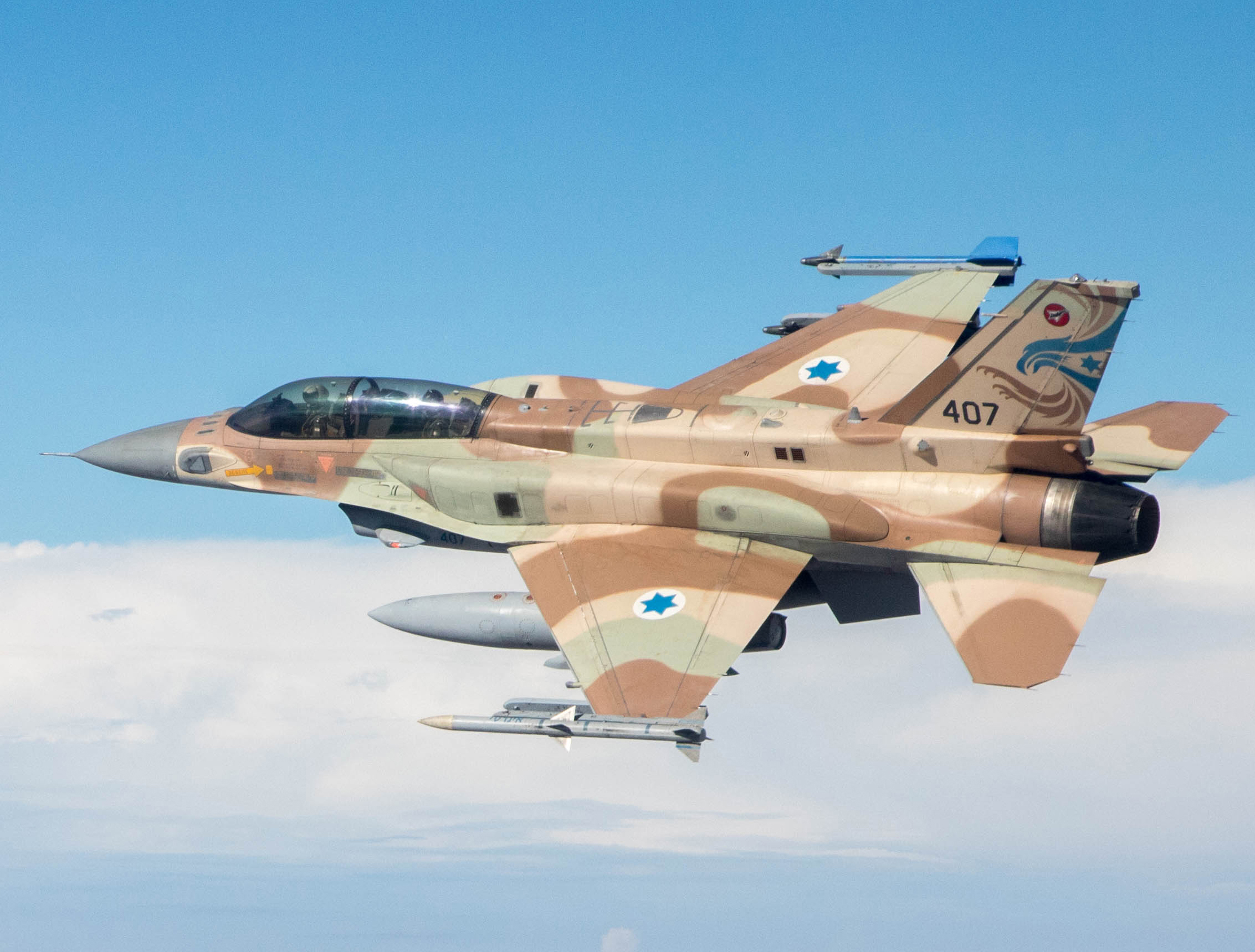
An F-16I "Sufa" in flight

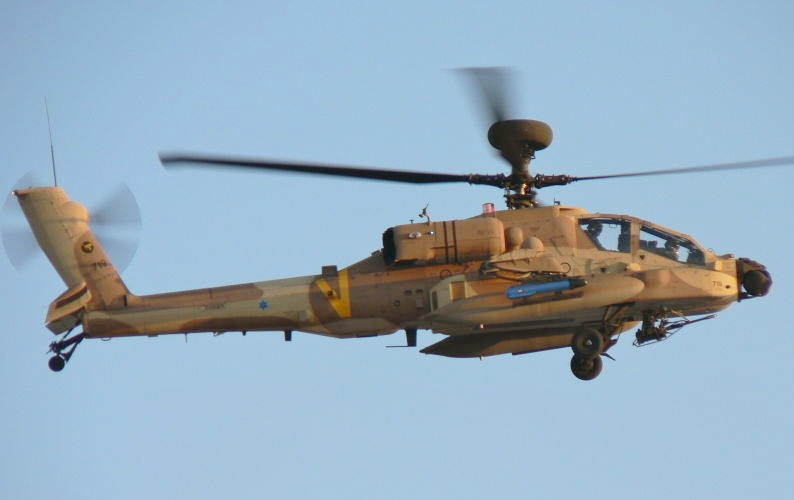
The Israeli AH-64D "Saraf"

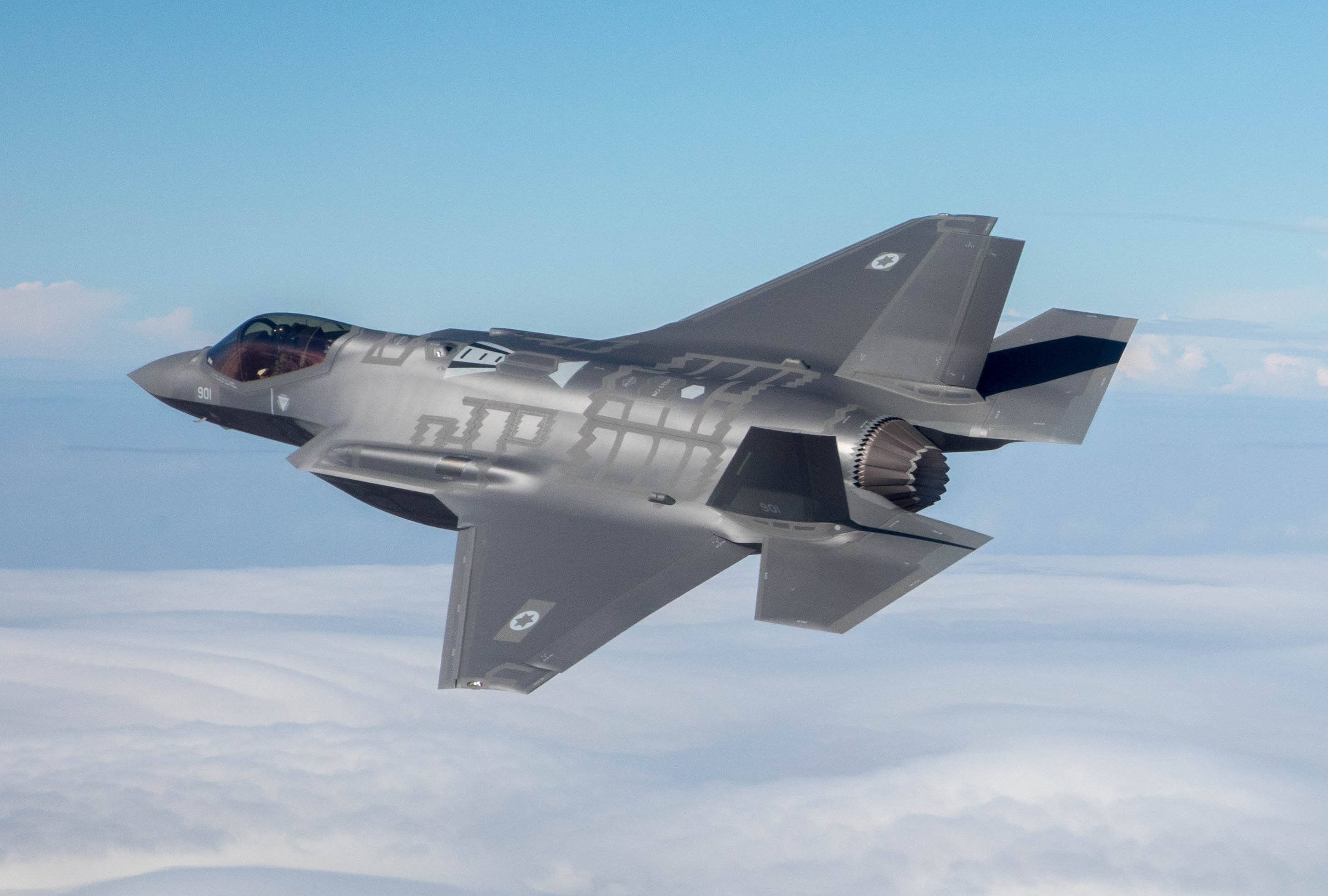
The F-35I "Adir's" first flight in Israel

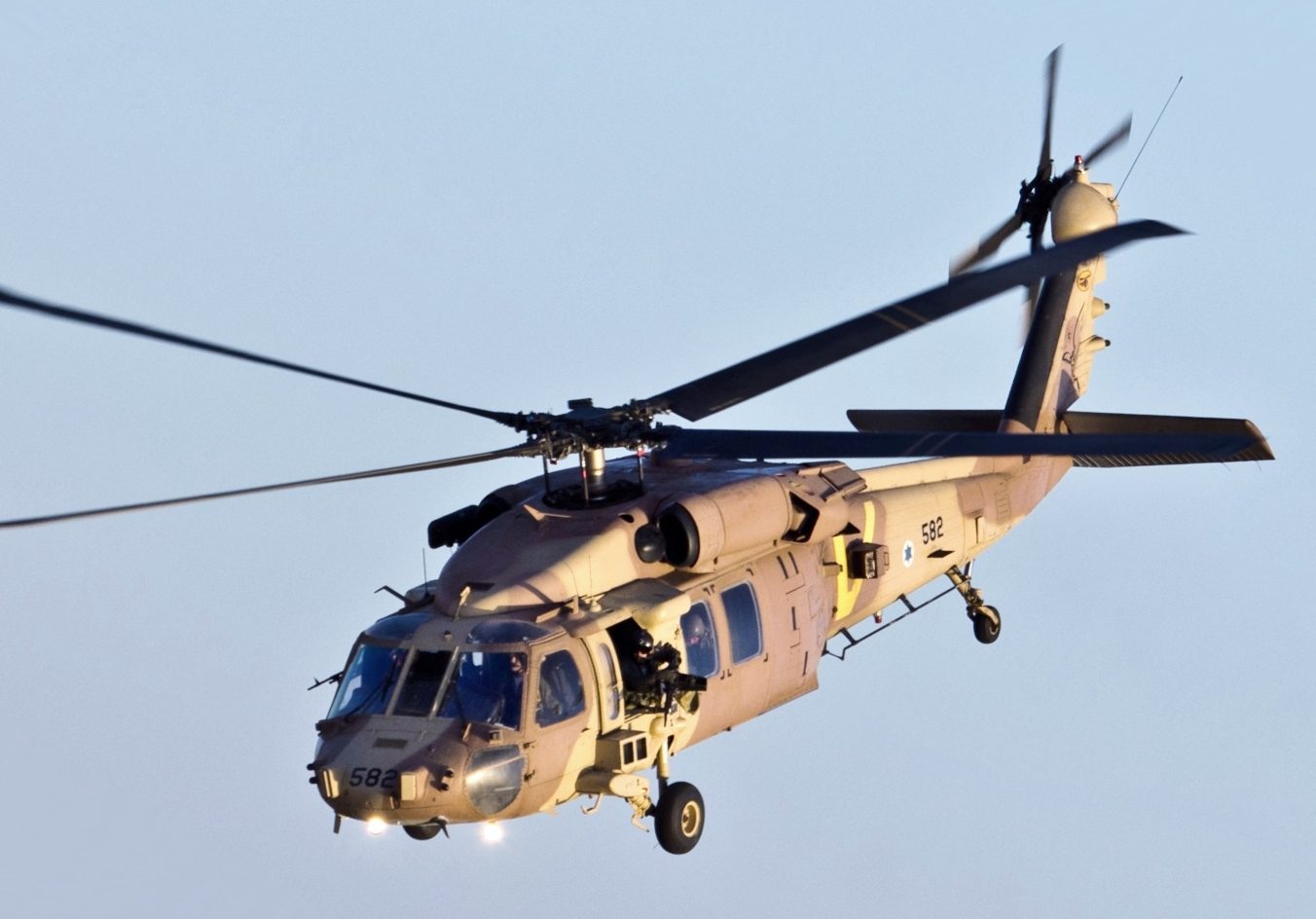
An Israeli UH-60L Yanshuf

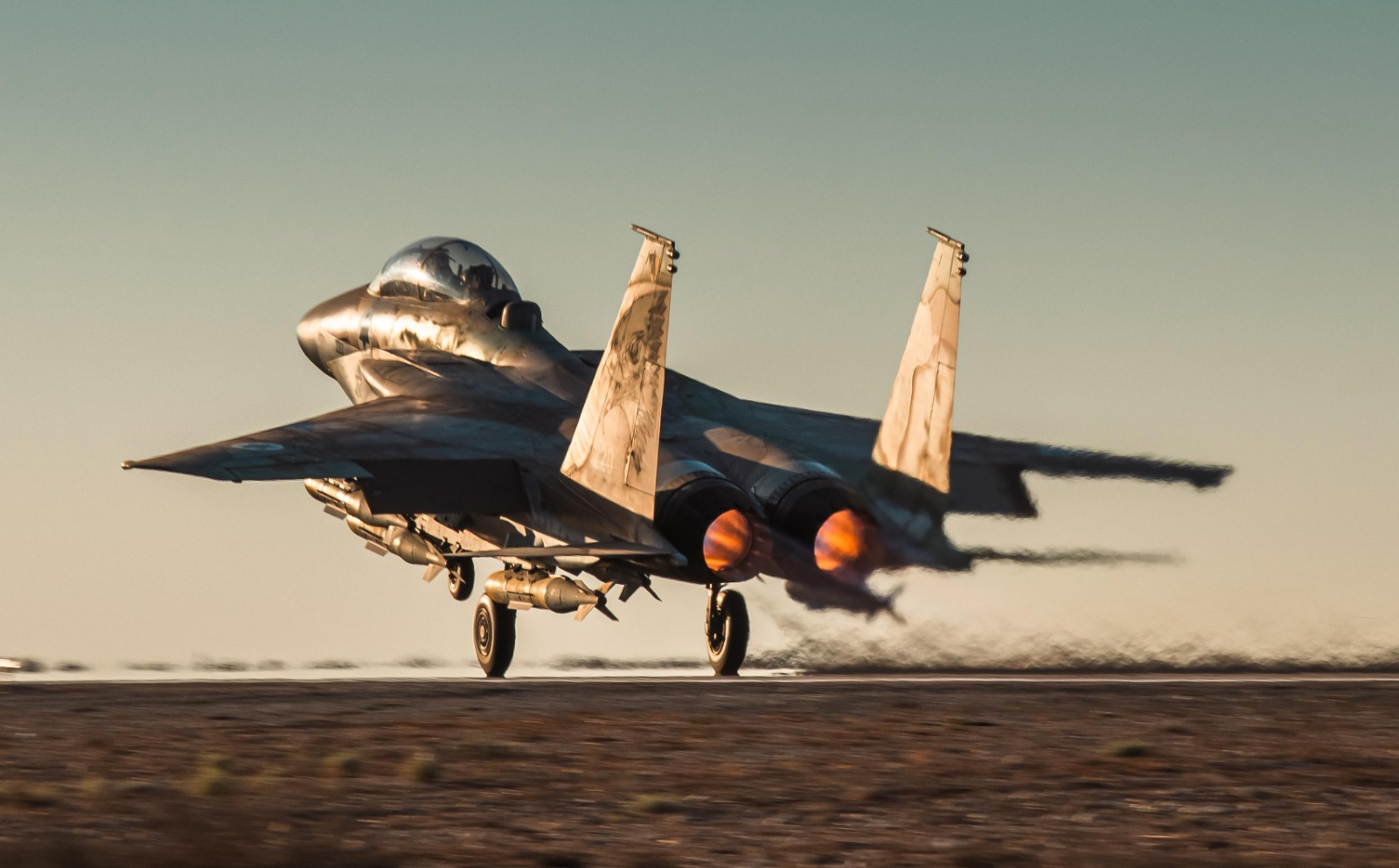
An F-15I "Ra'am" taking-off

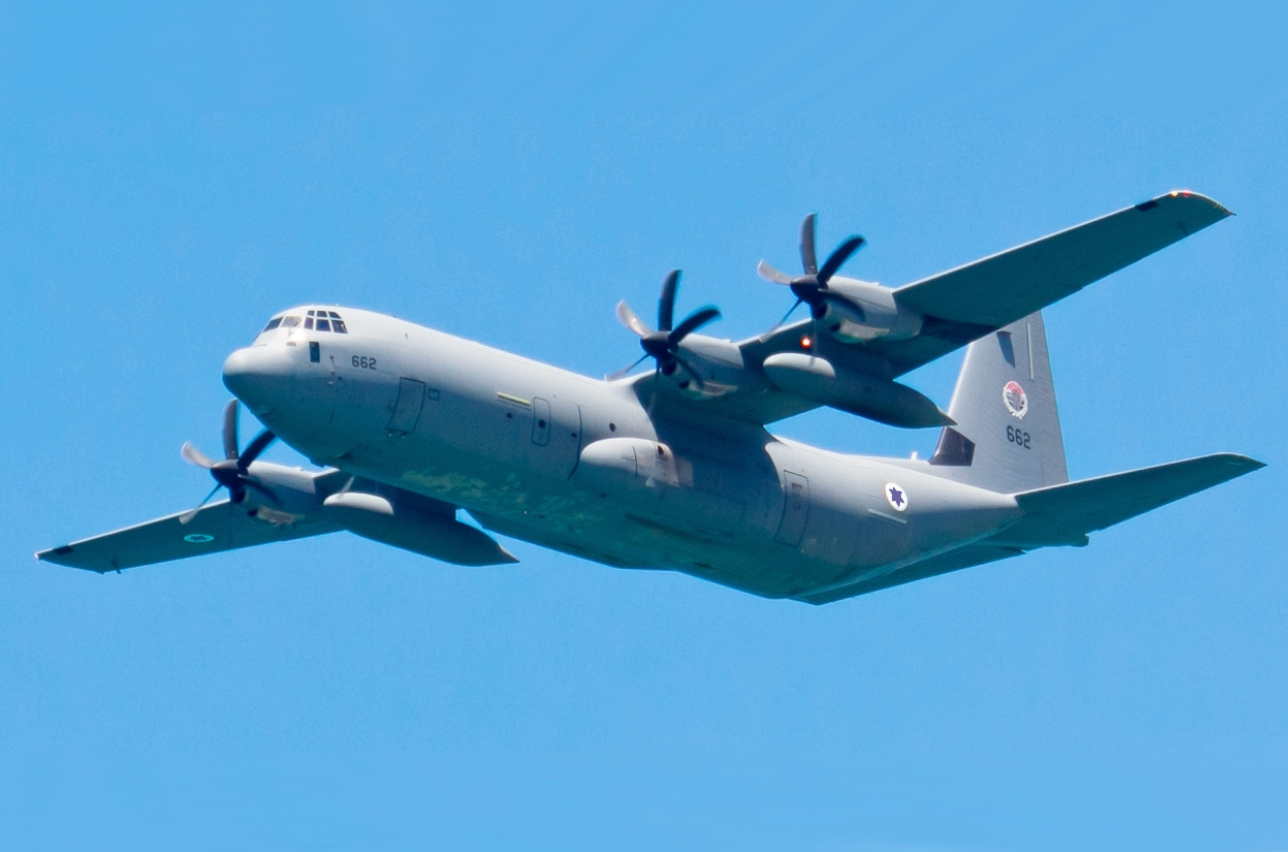
A C-130J Shimshon during Israel's 68th Independence Day

== Pilot selection and training ==
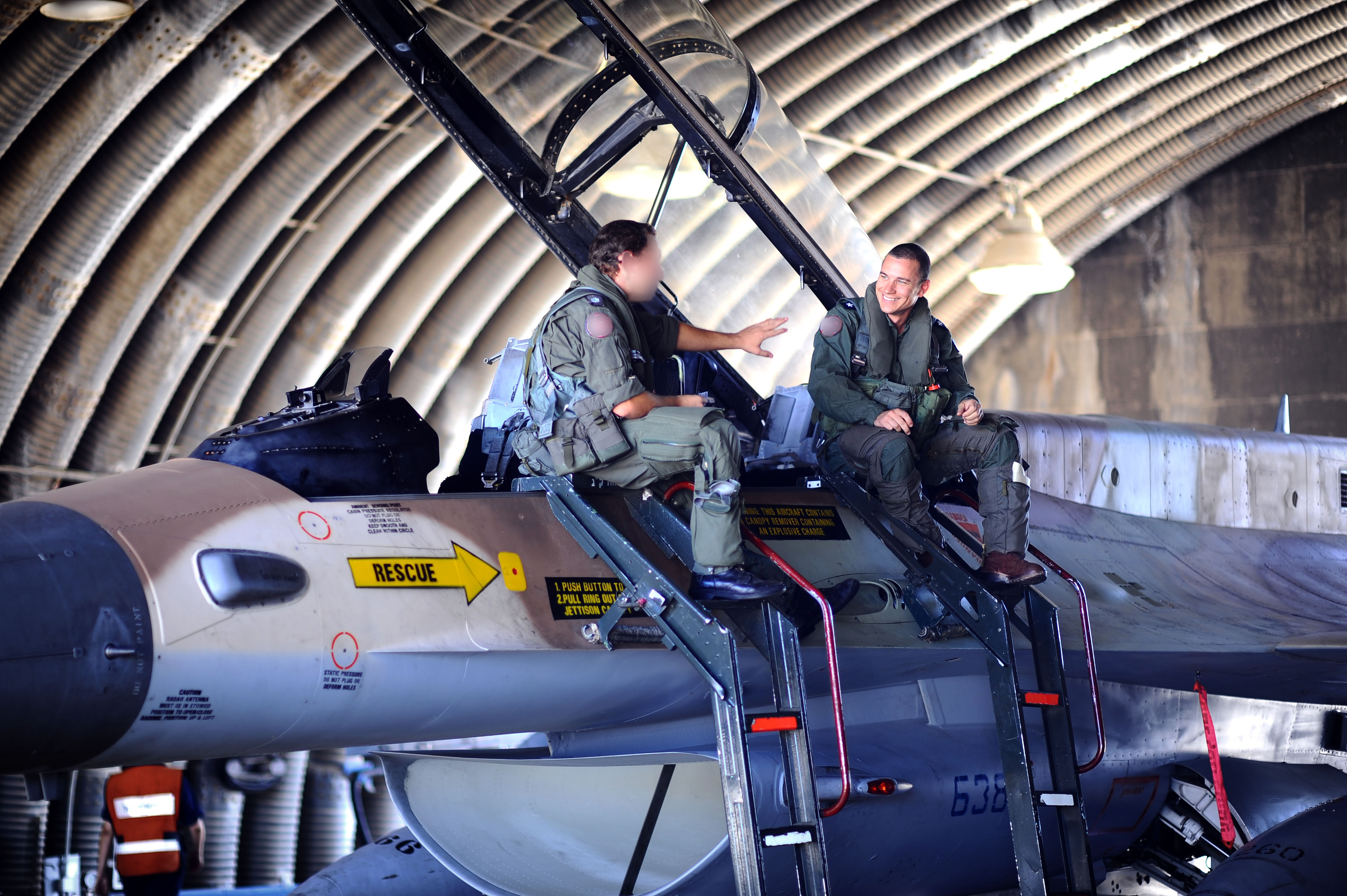
IAF Pilots sit atop an F-16D Barak

Thirty nine Israeli pilots have been credited with ace status, having shot down at least 5 enemy aircraft. Of these, 10 have shot down at least eight jet planes. The top ranking Israeli ace is Colonel Giora Epstein, who shot down seventeen enemy planes. Epstein holds the world record for jet aircraft shot down, and the most aircraft of any type shot down since the Korean War.

Israel Defence Forces had until 1995 denied women the opportunity to become pilots. In 1995, civilian pilot and aeronautical engineer Alice Miller successfully petitioned the Israel High Court of Justice to take the Israeli Air Force pilot training exams, after being rejected on grounds of gender. The court in 1996 eventually ruled that the IAF could not exclude qualified women from pilot training. Even though Miller would not pass the exams, the ruling was a watershed, opening doors for women in new IDF roles. After the prohibition had been lifted, the first female graduate was F-16 navigator "Shari" in 1998, followed three years later by Roni Zuckerman, the first female jet fighter pilot in IAF history.

=== Ranks ===
IAF ranks are identical to other Israel Defense Forces ranks. The rank insignia are identical except for the use of silver against a dark blue background. The service's most senior-ranking active officer is the air force commander, which is the billet of a major general (aluf), and reports directly to the IDF Chief of Staff.

==== Officers ====
Rank group	General/Flag/Air officers			Senior officers			Junior officers
Israeli Air Force
Israeli Air Force	רב-אלוף; Rav aluf	אלוף; Aluf	תת-אלוף; Tat aluf	אלוף משנה; Aluf mishne	סגן-אלוף; Sgan aluf	רב סרן; Rav seren	סרן; Seren	סגן; Segen	סגן-משנה; Segen mishne

==== Enlisted ====
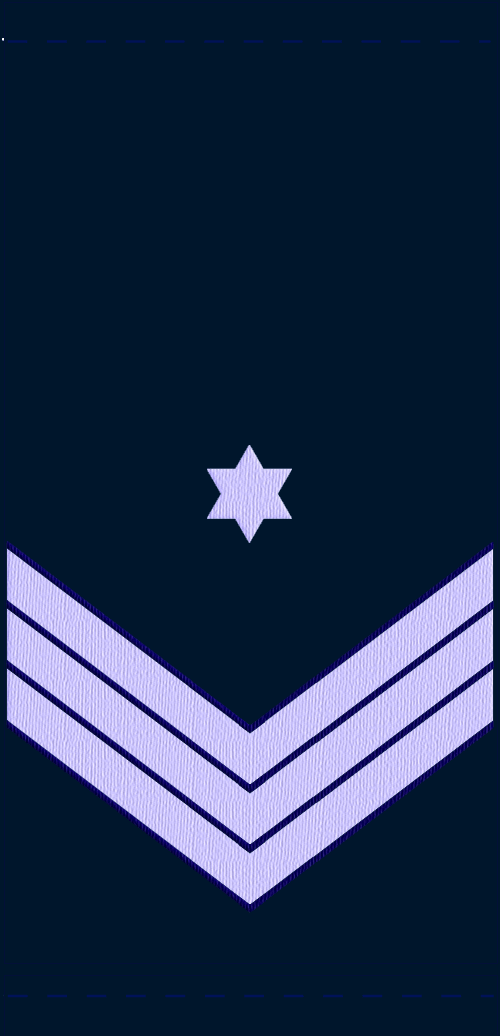
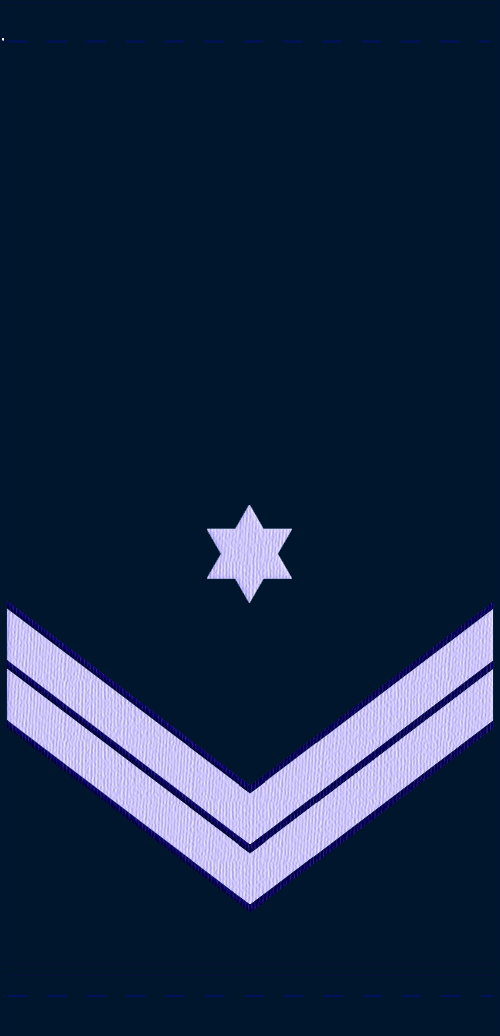
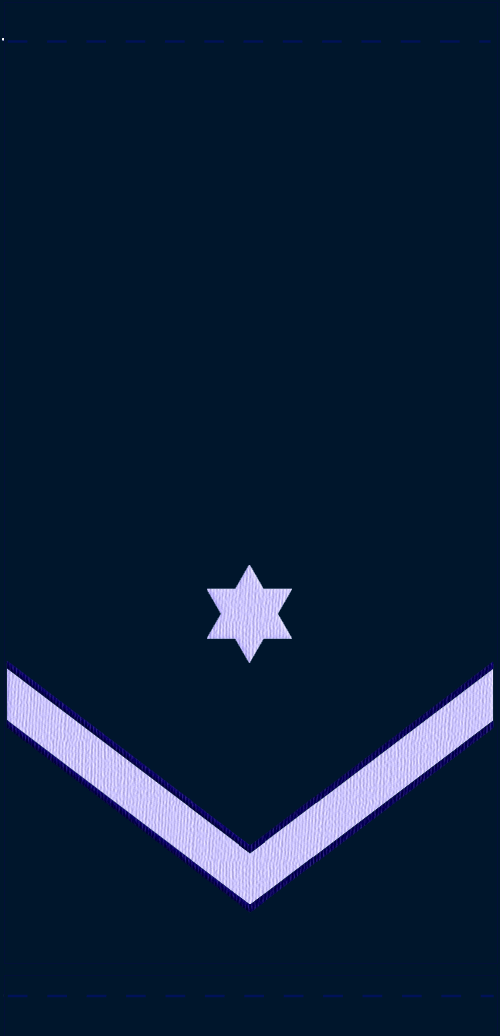
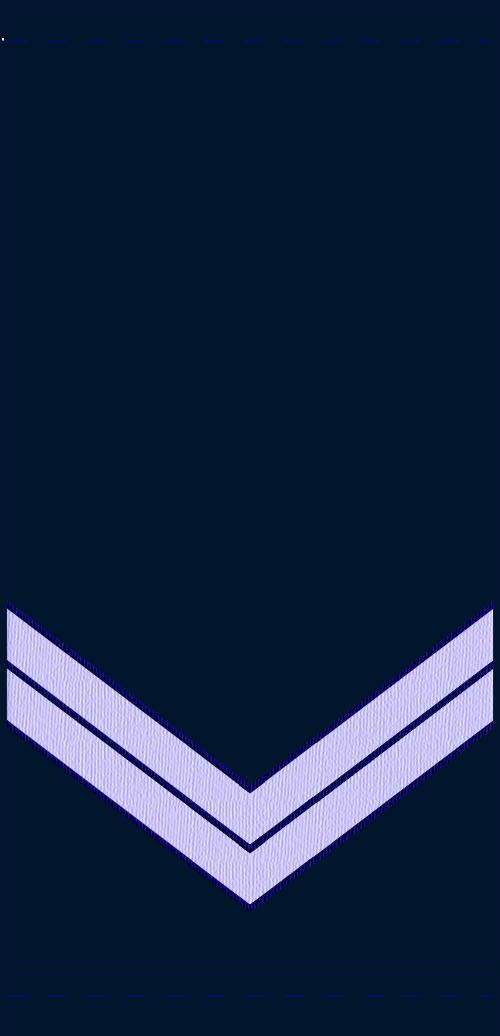
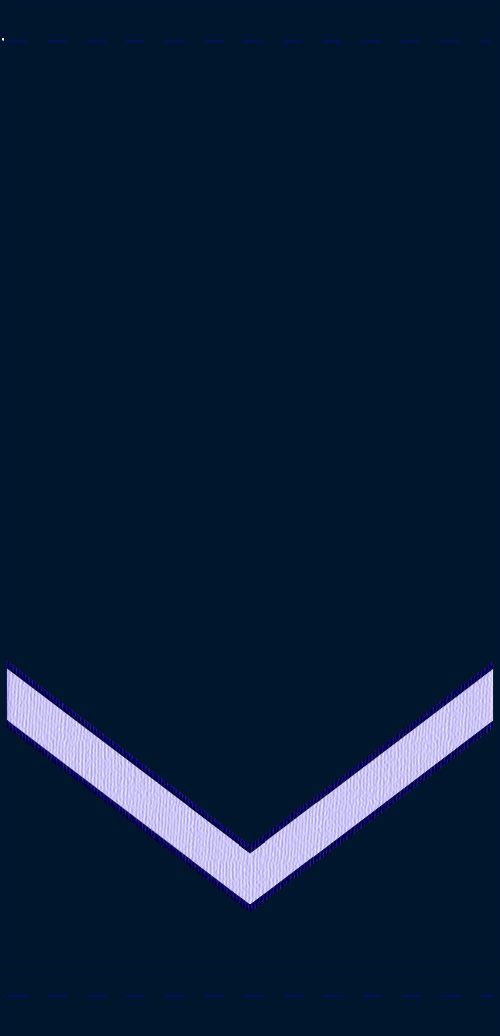
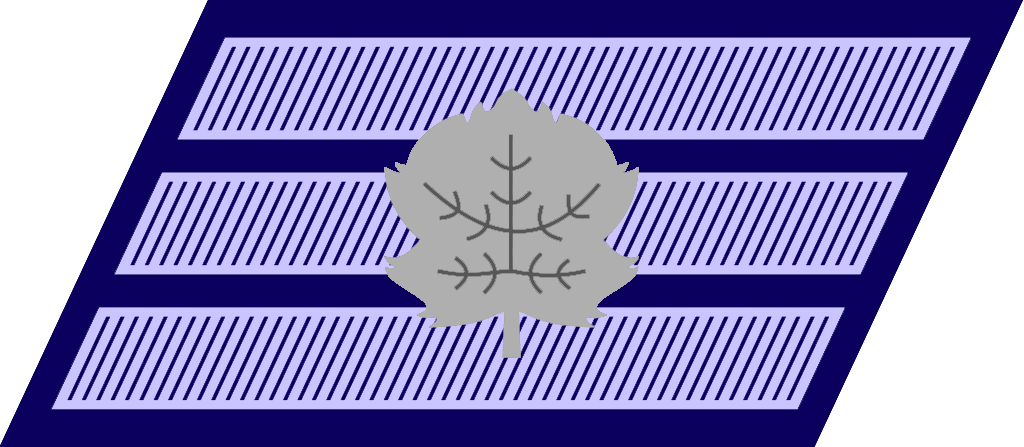
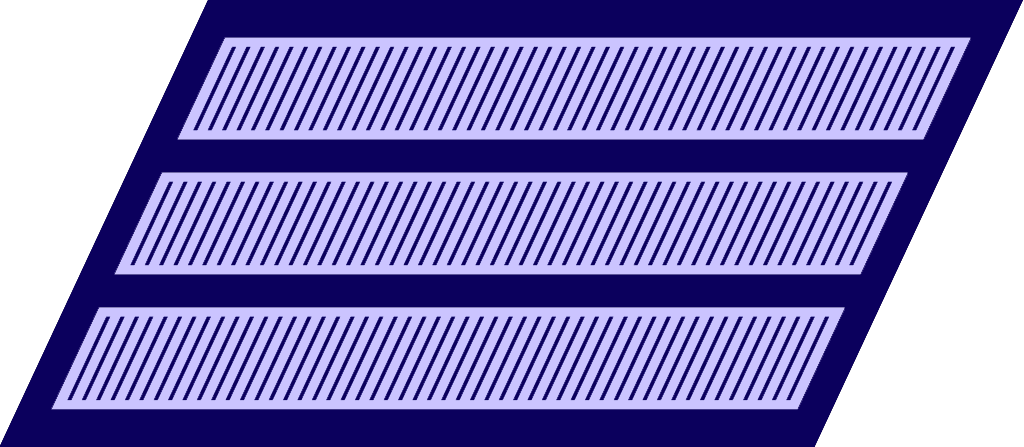
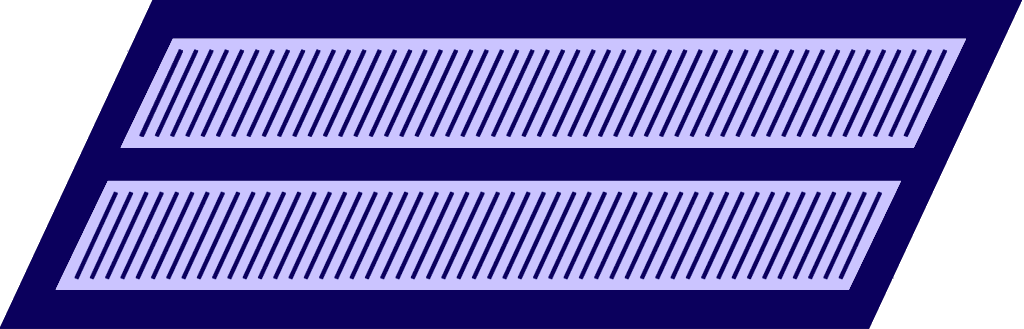
Rank group	Senior NCOs							Junior NCOs	Enlisted
Israeli Air Force									No insignia
Israeli Air Force	רב-נגד; Rav nagad	רב-סמל בכיר; Rav samal bakhír	רב-סמל מתקדם; Rav samal mitkadem	רב-סמל ראשון; Rav samal rishon	רב-סמל; Rav samal	סמל ראשון; Samal rishon	סמל; Samal	רב טוראי; Rav turai	טוראי; Turai

== See also ==
- Lists of flying aces in Arab–Israeli wars
- IDF code of ethics
- Nuclear weapons of Israel
- Post–World War II air-to-air combat losses
- Talpiot program
