= Unit 555 =

- יחידה 555
- Unit logo
- Active: 1969 – present
- Country: Israel
- Branch: Israeli Air Force
- Type: electronic warfare unit
- Role: Electromagnetic Warfare EW
- Part of: Israeli Air Force
- Garrison/HQ: Tel Nof Airbase
- Nickname: Sky Crows
- Motto: The most important is hidden from view

Commanders
- Notable commanders: Lt.Col Rami Luz

Insignia
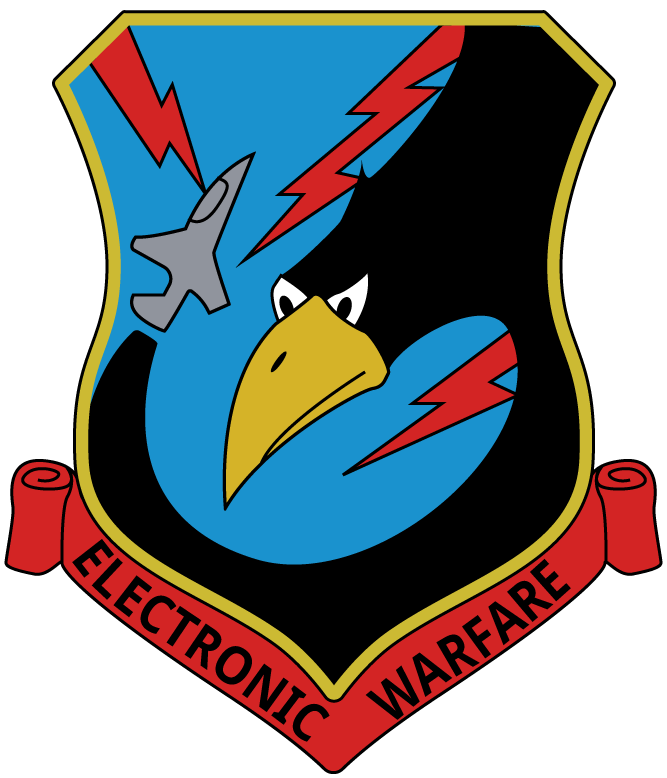
- Shoulder Patch

Aircraft flown
- Helicopter: Sikorsky CH-53 Sea Stallion
- Reconnaissance: Lockheed C-130 Hercules

Unit 555, also known as the Sky Crows, is the airborne electronic warfare unit of the Israeli Air Force. It was established in 1969 at the Lod Airbase. Currently, it is headquartered at the Tel Nof Airbase. It is one of the most classified units in the Israeli Air Force.

== History ==
The unit was established in 1969 during the War of Attrition as a counter to the strengthening of Egyptian army air defense systems along the Suez Canal. The unit was a combined force operating both aerial and ground assets.

On July 8, 1971, a Sikorsky CH-53 Sea Stallion modified for electronic warfare crashed in the Mediterranean Sea, near El Arish. All ten crew members including six members of the unit were killed in the incident.

On September 17, 1971, a Boeing 377 Stratocruiser electronic warfare plane was shot down east of the Suez Canal by two Egyptian SA-2 surface-to-air missiles. Seven crew members including two unit personnel perished in the incident.

In the Yom Kippur War, the unit also operated modified versions of the Douglas DC-3 with specialized electronic warfare and reconnaissance equipment. During the war, a Sikorsky CH-53 Sea Stallion modified for electronic warfare was shot down killing seven crew members including four unit personnel.

On April 19, 1974, two Sikorsky CH-53 Sea Stallion electronic warfare helicopters collided while landing at Rosh Pina Airport. Ten crew members including five unit personnel perished in the incident.

The unit operated in the First Lebanon War under the command of Lt.Col Rami Luz.

The unit is known to have utilized the planes of the Naschon Squadron having specially modified them for electronic warfare missions.

The unit was initially stationed at the Lod Airbase but was moved to Tel Nof Airbase after the closure of Lod Airbase.

The unit currently serves as an air support team and operates a wide variety of aircraft from various Israeli Air Force squadrons modifying them for electronic warfare. Commonly used aircraft include the Lockheed C-130 Hercules and the Sikorsky CH-53 Sea Stallions.

This unit is one of the most classified units with very little information being released about the unit's operations.

== Name and motto ==
The unit is nicknamed as the "sky crows" as the nickname was firstly used by the allied forces in World War II.

The motto of the unit is "The most important is hidden from view" and was taken from "The Little Prince".

== Equipment ==
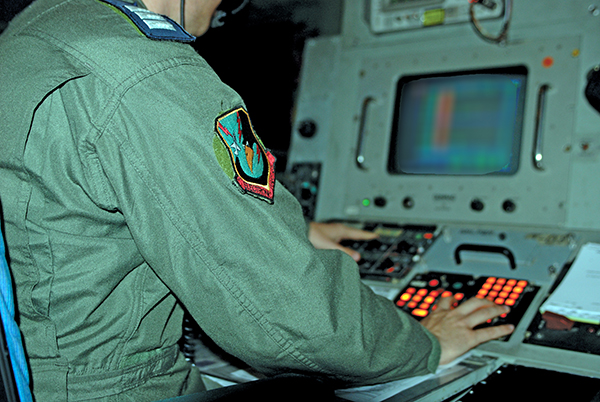
Unit personnel along with equipment

The unit's equipment is highly classified but is known to have been developed by the Defense industry of Israel.

== Roles ==
The unit's main mission is to operate various airborne electronic warfare systems to help Israeli aircraft evade oppositional air defense systems as well as to destroy oppositional air defense systems in order to achieve air superiority.
