= 1973 raid on Egyptian missile bases =

Israeli raid during the Yom Kippur War

16 October 1973 raid on Egyptian missile bases
- Part of the Yom Kippur War
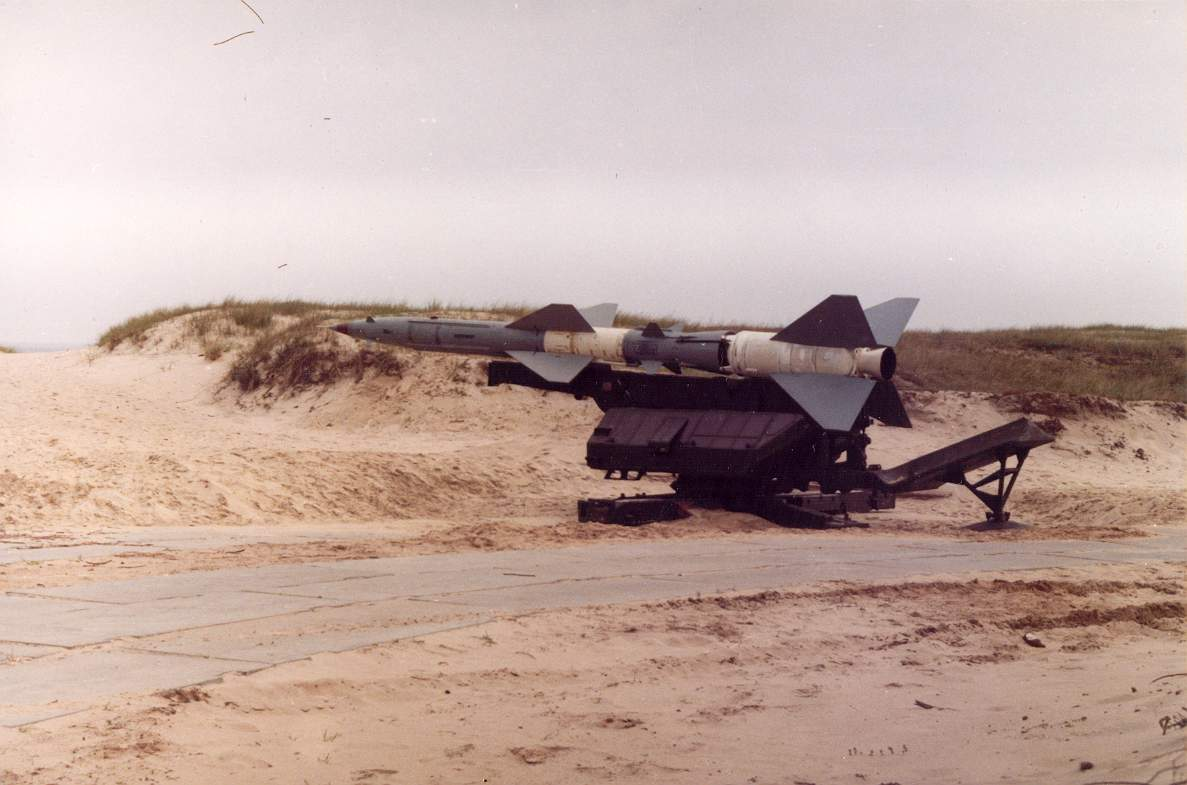
- SA-2 missile on a launcher
Date	16 October 1973
Location	West bank of the Suez Canal, Egypt 30°23′32.29″N 32°5′30.3″E
Result	Israeli victory

Belligerents
Israel	Egypt

Commanders and leaders
Major Giora Lev	

Strength
264th battalion of the 421st brigade	Unknown

Casualties and losses
None	3 missile bases destroyed, tanks and other defending military forces

The 16 October 1973 raid on Egyptian missile bases was an Israeli raid that took place during the Yom Kippur War. Conducted by the Israel Defense Forces' 421st Brigade, its goal was the creation of a corridor in the dense Egyptian air defense array, thus allowing Israeli Air Force to operate more safely in the vicinity of the Suez Canal. Egyptian military forces were significantly weakened in the operation due to the destruction of several tanks and three missile bases. According to Israeli claims, Israeli forces did not sustain any losses in personnel or equipment.
