= 122 Squadron (Israel) =

Israeli military unit

122nd Squadron IAF
- טייסת 122
- Logo of the Squadron
- Active: August 12, 1987 – present
- Country: Israel
- Allegiance: Israel Defense Forces
- Branch: Israeli Air Force
- Type: Air Defence
- Role: Performing Surveillance, Reconnaissance and Air Defence services
- Garrison/HQ: Nevatim Airbase
- Nickname: Naschon Squadron

Aircraft flown
- Reconnaissance: G550

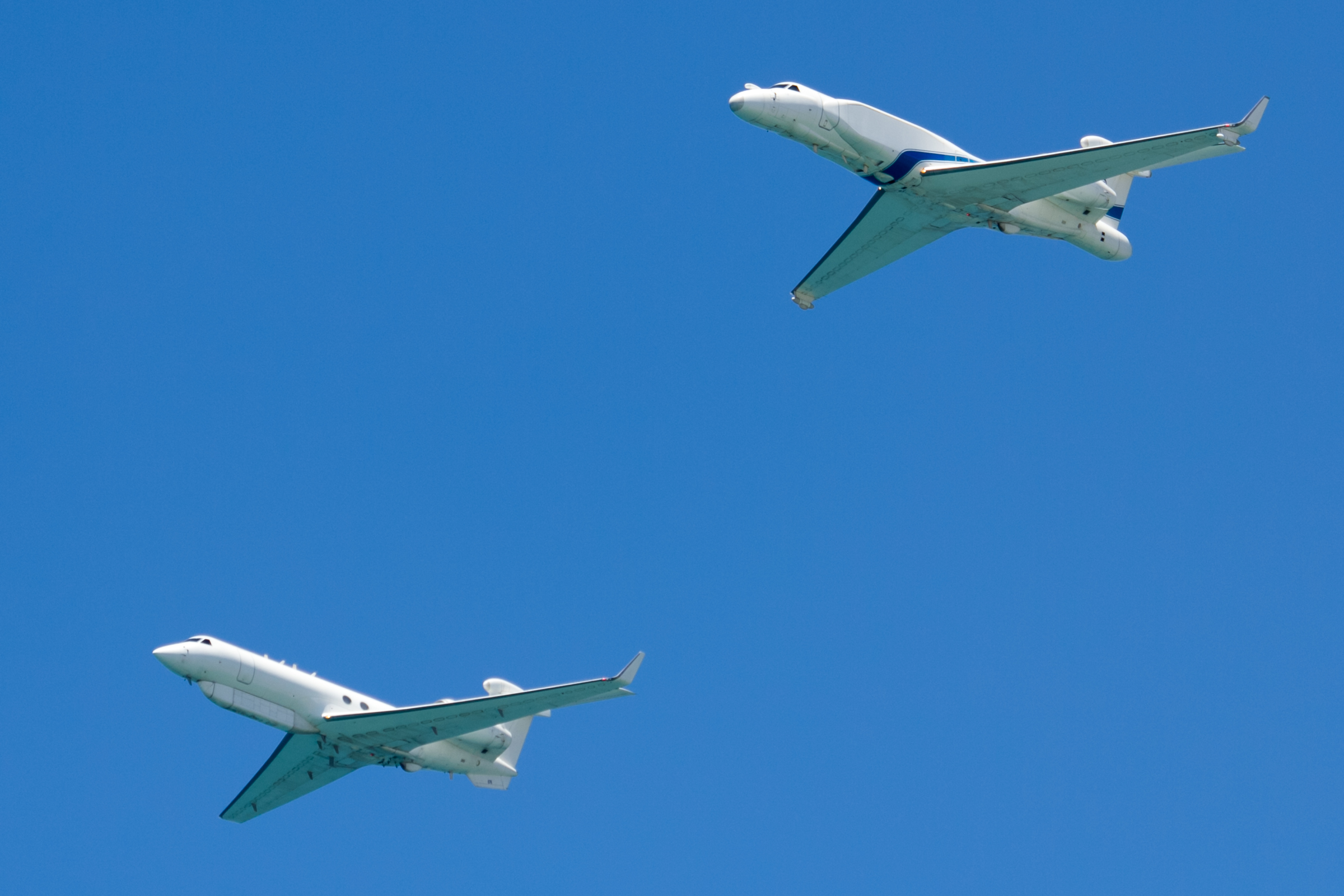
Both SEMA and CAEW aircraft

The 122 Squadron of the Israeli Air Force, also known as the Nahshon Squadron (former Dakota Squadron), is a G550 squadron based at Nevatim Airbase.

== History ==
The Squadron has six planes with three aircraft used for Airborne early warning and control (CAEW or Conformal Airborne Early Warning, IAI EL/W-2085) and three are used for Signals intelligence (SEMA or Special Electronic Missions Aircraft).

The Squadron operated Douglas C-47 Skytrain aircraft until 2000.

=== Timeline ===
Squadron 122 was established on June 1, 1971 in BHA 27, as a DC-3 Dakota squadron and was called the "Dakota Squadron". Its assigned missions included transport, reconnaissance and special missions.

At the beginning of 1974, the Israeli Air Force decided to purchase two OV-1D Mohawk aircraft from the United States Army for reconnaissance and intelligence-gathering missions intended to help supervise the separation of forces agreements with Egypt and Syria . In August 1974, the Mohawk aircraft joined the Dakota aircraft in Squadron 122. The Mohawk aircraft, which was named "Bat" by the Israeli Air Force, was equipped with an oblique optical camera, an infrared sensor and a side radar ( N ) . And the information received by its sensors was transmitted in real time to a ground station for decoding.

On July 10, 1980, a Dakota aircraft of the squadron crashed on the side of Mount Arif in the Negev Mountain, due to poor visibility, during low navigation training .

In March 1982, following a work accident, it was decided to take the second Mohawk out of service as well.

In the First Lebanon War, the Dakota aircraft of the squadron performed transport, casualty evacuation, electronic warfare and relay missions .

The electronic warfare was carried out by u Unit 555 in the " Kochav Hama " branch of the squadron, both by Arab planes adapted to LA (a model that received the nickname "Kochav Hama") and by Dakota planes installed in LA systems.

On October 30, 1983, the squadron received the first Arava aircraft (model 201), and about half a year later, in April 1984, conducted the first operational training course in the new aircraft. In 1987, the squadron began to receive aircraft from the more advanced model of the Arava, the 202A model. The reception of the improved aircraft continued until 1989 .

On August 3, 2000, the Dakota aircraft were withdrawn from service in the Israeli Air Force and on January 30, 2001, the official farewell ceremony was held.

A few years later, the Arava planes were also taken out of service and the squadron was silenced.

The squadron was re-opened as the "Nachshon Squadron" after a discussion held on October 20, 2002 with the Chief of Staff of the Air Force, Brigadier General Eliezer Shakdi, it was decided to reject the position of the Planning and Organization Department (TOAR) which supported the placement of the "Nachshon" aircraft in the 120 Squadron ("The International Squadron") and to accept the position of the transport array that supported the placement of the aircraft in Squadron 122. On June 26, 2005, the squadron received the first "Nachshon" aircraft, a Gulfstream G500 ("Nachshon Shavit").

In 2012, Squadron 122 won the Chief of Staff's award for outstanding units .

In 2015, the squadron participated in the humanitarian expedition to Nepal after the earthquake that struck it. In this operation, premature Israeli babies who were in Nepal with their parents were returned to Israel and rushed back to their homeland.

In 2019, Lt. Col. G was appointed to command the squadron, and was the first woman in the Air Force to command a flight squadron .

In 2020, the squadron led a flight over the skies of Germany, where a formation of Israeli and German fighter jets, led by a Nachshon aircraft of squadron 122, flew over the skies of the Dachau camp and over the location of the abduction of the Munich Olympics athletes. The commander of the Israeli Air Force, the commander of the German Luftwaffe (Air Force), and the squadron commander were present in the leading Nachshon cockpit .

In April 2021, it began receiving a Gulfstream G550 aircraft in the squadron, nicknamed "Oron", in which an Israeli-made system will be installed to collect intelligence on various targets.

The wide range flight unit works in cooperation with the squadron and collects intelligence using its Comet aircraft.

== Specialised aircraft ==
The squadron operates the "Eitam" aircraft, a Gulfstream G-550 executive aircraft in an air control configuration, which operates in conjunction with the control system in the Israeli Air Force as a sort of "flying air defense system". The aircraft's activity expands the coverage range of the limited ground air defense systems in the topography of the land, thus allowing one to observe larger spaces.
