= International reactions to the Qana airstrike =

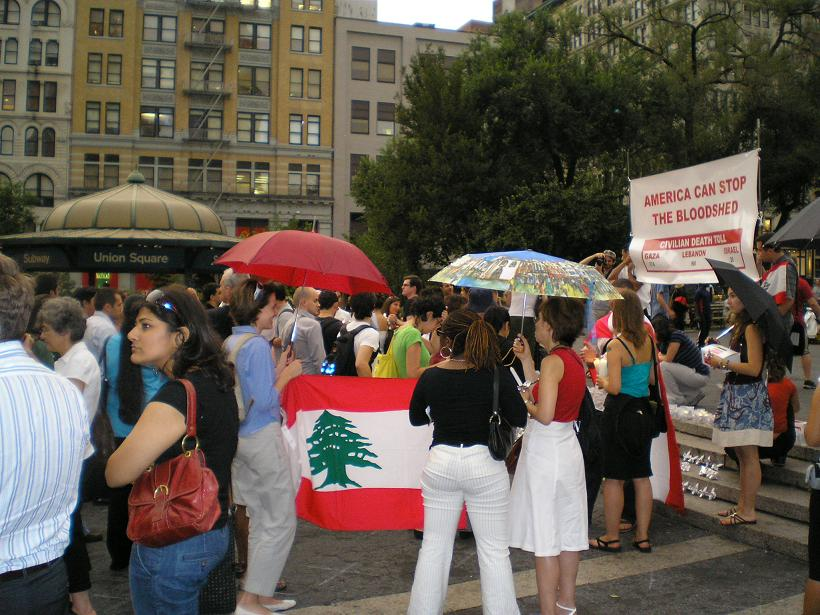
New York City: Union Square protest of Israeli bombing of Lebanon, August 3, 2006

International reactions to the 2006 Qana airstrike, which saw the greatest loss of civilian life in the 2006 Israel-Lebanon conflict, twenty eight deaths with thirteen missing, largely involved the condemnation of Israel by many countries around the globe, bringing about a supposed 48 hours cessation of air operations by the Israeli Air Force. Bombings resumed only a few hours after the start of the cessation of air operations.

== Supranational bodies ==
- United Nations - United Nations Secretary-General Kofi Annan called an emergency Security Council meeting Sunday at the request of Lebanese Prime Minister Fuad Saniora where a French draft resolution, including an immediate cease-fire, was discussed. In the meeting, Annan said: "we must condemn this action in the strongest possible terms ... I am deeply dismayed that my earlier calls for immediate cessation of hostilities were not heeded, with the result that innocent life continues to be taken and innocent civilians continue to suffer."

== Lebanon ==
- Lebanon - The Lebanese government has asked Condoleezza Rice to cancel a visit to Lebanon insisting that they will only negotiate an immediate, unconditional cease-fire. Lebanese Defence Minister Elias Murr disputed allegations that Hezbollah was firing missiles from Qana and said "What do you expect Israel to say? Will it say that it killed 40 children and women?"
  - Hezbollah - Stated that "this horrific massacre will not go without a response."

== Israel ==
- Israel - Israeli UN Ambassador Dan Gillerman said that it was a "horrible, tragic incident." Gillerman said the dead were "victims of Hezbollah," which he said was using civilian buildings as cover to launch rockets into Israel. Israeli Government spokeswoman Miri Eisen said that Israel is "deeply sorry" for what had happened, and claimed that there would be an investigation in Israel to find out how the airstrike could have happened.

== Greater Middle East ==
- Arab League - League's Secretary-General said that "The attacks that Israeli forces are launching targeting civilians and the Lebanese infrastructure are another confirmation of Israeli aggressive intentions."
- Algeria - The Ministry of Foreign Affairs issued a statement where it condemned "this criminal act that nothing could justify", and asked for an immediate and unconditional cease-fire.
- Egypt - President of Egypt Hosni Mubarak stated that "The Arab Republic of Egypt expresses its profound alarm and its condemnation of the irresponsible Israeli bombing of the Lebanese village of Qana, which resulted in innocent casualties, mostly women and children."
- Iraq - Grand Ayatollah Ali al-Sistani, Iraq's top Shia cleric, stated, "Islamic nations will not forgive the entities that hinder a cease-fire." He added, "It is not possible to stand helpless in front of this Israeli aggression on Lebanon. If an immediate cease-fire in this Israeli aggression is not imposed, dire consequences will befall the region."
- Jordan - Jordanian King Abdullah II condemned "the ugly crime perpetrated by Israeli forces in Qana that is a gross violation of all international statutes."
- Kuwait - Jassem AlKharafi, the parliament speaker of Kuwait, condemned the attacks and quoted that "the Israel 'savage and barbaric' aggression on Lebanon surpassed all moral and humanitarian limits and formed a disregard of international law and human rights and the world community". Kuwait Prime Minister Nasser Al-Mohammed Al-Ahmed Al-Sabah also condemned the attacks.
- Palestinian Authority - Palestinian President Mahmoud Abbas stated that "what happened in Qana is an ugly massacre. It is a new Israeli crime that it be immediately stopped for the protection of civilian life."
  - Hamas - A Hamas legislator said that "In the face of this open war against the Arab and Muslim nations all options are open, including striking the depth of the Zionist entity."
- Sahrawi Arab Democratic Republic - The Saharawi government considered that "the use of violence and the policy of the colonial fait accompli through the occupation of the territories, slaughter and terror against the helpless citizens are contradictory with morals, laws and customs of humanity, and against the international legality", according to a press release that also expressed "its solidarity with the Lebanese people in this tragedy because of the slaughter perpetrated by the Israeli forces against the village of Qana, and the support in its struggle for the defence of its independence and territorial sovereignty" and "its solidarity with the Palestinian people, who faces the aggressions perpetrated by the Israeli forces, urging for an urgent enablement of this people to exercise their right to self-determination and to have their independent state".
- Syria - Syrian U.N. Ambassador Bashar Jaafari stated that "These bombs ... are American bombs. They call them laser-guided bombs but actually they are hatred-guided bombs, and unfortunately these bombs are made in the U.S.A." Syrian President Bashar al-Assad also said:"The massacre committed by Israel in Qana this morning shows the barbarity of this aggressive entity. It constitutes state terrorism committed in front of the eyes and ears of the world."
- Tunisia - The country expressed "its condemnation on this criminal act."
- United Arab Emirates - called the event an "ugly massacre."

== Americas ==
- Organization of American States - The Secretary General of the OAS, José Miguel Insulza released a statement condemning "the death of innocent civilians, especially children, in Qana, Lebanon, as a result of Israeli bombing." The statement also called for immediate cessation of hostilities by all parties.
- Brazil - In a letter dated 30 July 2006 to the Lebanese premier Fouad Siniora, President Luiz Inácio Lula da Silva said he was "shocked, angered and dismayed at violent Israeli shelling this Sunday on Qana, in southern Lebanon, which has victimized the civilian population, including dozens of children, women and elderly".
- Canada - Foreign Affairs Minister Peter MacKay said, "These are very tragic circumstances. The people of Lebanon and Israel have been profoundly affected by the bombing... The tragedy is really for civilians. The infrastructure has been devastated in parts of Lebanon, particularly the south." Prime Minister Stephen Harper made it clear Canada supported Israel's military campaign against Hezbollah militants in Lebanon. Michael Ignatieff, then the leading candidate for the leadership of the Liberal Party of Canada, caused controversy by saying that while the deaths were tragic, he "wasn't losing sleep" over them ; he later caused additional controversy by referring to the airstrike as a "war crime" .
- Chile Foreign Minister Alejandro Foxley released a statement saying "We desire an immediate cease fire and withdrawal of invading forces from Lebanon."
- Mexico's Foreign Ministry "condemned the tactics used by Hezbollah such as launching rockets at civilians in Israel, as much as those by Israel against Lebanon described as a disproportionate use of force."
- United States - United States Secretary of State Condoleezza Rice announced that she postponed her visit to Beirut, adding that:"We [the United States Government] want a ceasefire as soon as possible, I would have wanted a ceasefire yesterday if possible, but the parties have to agree to a ceasefire and there have to be certain conditions in place... Any ceasefire has to have circumstances that are going to be acceptable to the parties." President George W. Bush said the United States "mourns the loss of innocent life" and that all parties with a stake in the Mideast conflict "must work together to achieve a sustainable peace." The Bush administration has refused to call for an immediate cease-fire, with officials saying they want a "sustainable" end to hostilities—one that includes efforts to prevent future Hezbollah attacks against Israel.
- Venezuela Vice President Jose Vicente Rangel said, "This murder of dozens of women and children has no justification whatsoever." The UN and other powerful nations shared blame for the attack because they had responded to Israel's military campaign in Palestine and Lebanon with "silence and omissions."

== Asia ==
- Bangladesh - The foreign minister of Bangladesh called the attacks State Terrorism.
- China - Foreign Ministry spokesman Liu Jianchao said that the PRC "strongly condemns [the air strike]," adding that "the Lebanese-Israeli conflict has already created a serious humanitarian disaster in Lebanon" and that "China strongly calls for an immediate and unconditional ceasefire in order to prevent the creation of an even greater disaster."
- Iran - The Iranian Foreign Ministry stated that "The Qana bombing is the outcome of Rice's trip to the region. Some American officials should be put on trial for the crimes in Lebanon.".
- India - The country's External Affairs Ministry issued the following statement: "India strongly condemns the continued irresponsible and indiscriminate bombing of Lebanon by the Israeli military, ignoring calls for restraint."
- Japan - The government of Japan issued the following statement: "The Government of Japan strongly deplores the incident on July 30 in which many Lebanese civilians including children were killed by an Israel Air Force strike despite the repeated calls for Israel's self-restraint by the international society." It also called for an immediate cease-fire.
- Pakistan - Prime Minister Shaukat Aziz said "the Pakistani government and people strongly condemn this sad incident, which is clearly unwarranted aggression, and calls for an immediate ceasefire."
- Singapore - Singaporean officials have condemned the attacks, calling for the UN to swiftly get a ceasefire ready.
- South Korea - The Ministry of Foreign Affairs and Trade released a statement expressing regret at the loss of life by the Israeli airstrikes. It also called on the government of Lebanon to make efforts to return kidnapped Israeli soldiers.
- Vietnam - The Spokenman Of Ministry Of Foreign Affairs Le Dzung said: "Vietnam condemns Israel's air strike on Qana village in Southern Lebanon on July 30th 2006 that killed many civilians, the majority of whom were children and women. Vietnam calls upon the parties concerned to execute an immediate ceasefire and exercise utmost restraint to avoid causing more harm to civilians"

== Europe ==
- European Union - EU High Representative for the Common Foreign and Security Policy, Javier Solana, said that he has "talked to the Prime Minister of Lebanon ... I have expressed to him my profound dismay and deep sorrow at the attack and the death of innocent civilians in Qana. Nothing can justify that."
- France - French President Jacques Chirac said that "France condemns this unjustifiable action, which shows more than ever the need to move toward an immediate cease-fire."
- United Kingdom - British Foreign Secretary Margaret Beckett stated: "It's absolutely dreadful, it's quite appalling. We have repeatedly urged Israel to act proportionately."
- Germany - Foreign minister, Frank-Walter Steinmeier stated that "the highest priority must now be a cease-fire as quickly as possible," and expressed "horror" of the deaths.
- Greece - Foreign Ministry spokesman Giorgos Koumoutsakos stated: "We are filled with repugnance and deep sadness. ... Now the need for an immediate cease-fire is more pressing than ever."
- Ireland - The Irish Taoiseach Bertie Ahern condemned the attack saying he was shocked and appalled at the heavy loss of life and that an immediate ceasefire is urgently needed. He called the attack "despicable".
- Italy - Italian Prime Minister Romano Prodi said: "I truly hope that a road to peace is found again."
- Norway - The Norwegian Minister of Foreign Affairs, Jonas Gahr Støre said "Norway condemns such actions against civilians and calls for an immediate ceasefire" and described the attack as "a clear-cut violation of international law".
- Spain - The Spanish government's expressed "profound consternation and condemns the Israeli bombardment."
- Sweden - The Swedish Prime Minister, Göran Persson said he reacted with "dismay and wrath". He commented that "even Israel must stand up for international rights, and use proportionate countermeasures in their situation."
- Turkey - Ankara stated: "We are filled with deep sadness because of the death of innocent people." Foreign Ministry called Israel for an immediate cease-fire.
- Vatican City - Pope Benedict XVI said that "In the name of God, I call on all those responsible for this spiral of violence so that weapons are immediately laid down on all sides."

== NGOs ==
- Amnesty International issued a statement saying: "The devastating attack on Qana makes clear that an immediate and full ceasefire is urgently needed. Measures taken by Israel to temporarily suspend airstrikes over southern Lebanon are insufficient. Both sides to this conflict have shown a blatant disregard for the laws of war and civilians on both sides are paying the price as war crimes abound..."
- Human Rights Watch - The Human Rights organization issued a statement placing responsibility for the attacks on Israel. The statement read: "Israel remains under a strict obligation to direct attacks at only military objectives, and to take all feasible precautions to avoid the incidental loss of civilian life."
