= IAF Aerobatic Team =

Israeli Air Force military unit

- Israeli Air Force Aerobatic Team emblem
- Active: 1973–present
- Country: Israel
- Branch: Israel Air Force
- Role: Aerobatic Display
- Garrison/HQ: Hatzerim Airbase
- Colors: Red and white

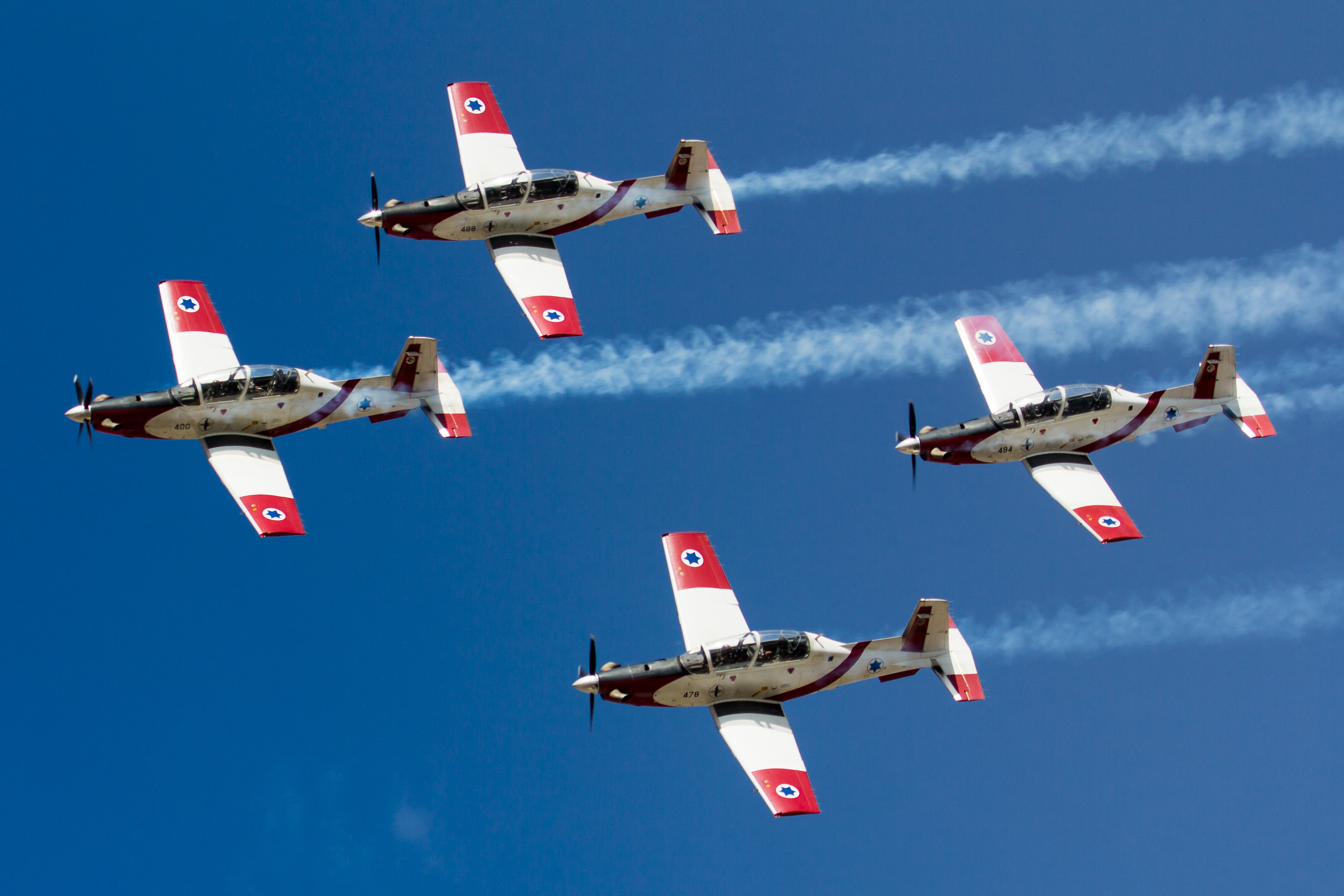
The T-6 Texan IIs in formation

The IAF Aerobatic Team is the aerobatic display team of the Israeli Air Force. Until summer 2010 the team flew the IAI Tzukit, a variant of the French Fouga Magister manufactured under license by Israel Aerospace Industries. Since then the team operates four Beechcraft T-6 Texan II aircraft (#478, #484, #493, and #494).

The team typically flies demonstrations at the graduation ceremony of the IAF flight academy and on Israel's independence day. Based at Hatzerim Airbase, the team is staffed by IAF Flight Academy personnel and its pilots are active instructors.

Ido Nehoshtan, the commander of the Israeli Air Force in 2008–2012 is a former member of the team, as is Eitan Ben Eliyahu, commander of the Israeli Air Force in 1996–2000.

== Tzukit era ==
The Tzukit, a jet-powered trainer, was used in the selection and training of IAF Flight Academy cadets. It was a modified version of the French Fouga Magister, which had served the IAF in the training role since 1960. The Fouga Magister also saw limited combat against Egyptian and Jordanian forces during the 1967 Six-Day War. A number of aircraft were lost to enemy fire.

The Magisters were later radically revamped by the IAI and fitted for carrying advanced motors and equipment. The first prototype of the Tzukit took to the air in September 1980, and was handed over to the IAF in May 1981 for initial testing. At the IAF's request certain modifications were carried out and included in the first serial production Tzukits, and deliveries to the IAF started June 1983. All Tzukit aircraft had been delivered to the IAF by 1986.

These aerobatic aircraft were always fully armed, according to a senior Air Force officer who spoke to the Jerusalem Post.
