= Hatzerim Airbase =

Israeli Air Force base

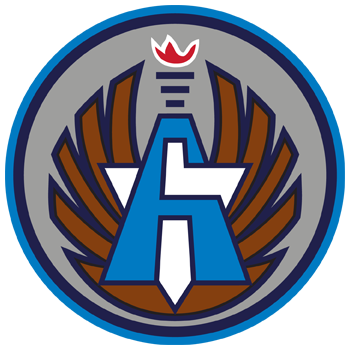
Hatzerim Israeli Air Force Base Air Force Base 6
- בָּסִיס חֵיל-הַאֲוִויר חֲצֵרִים
- Beersheba, Southern District in Israel
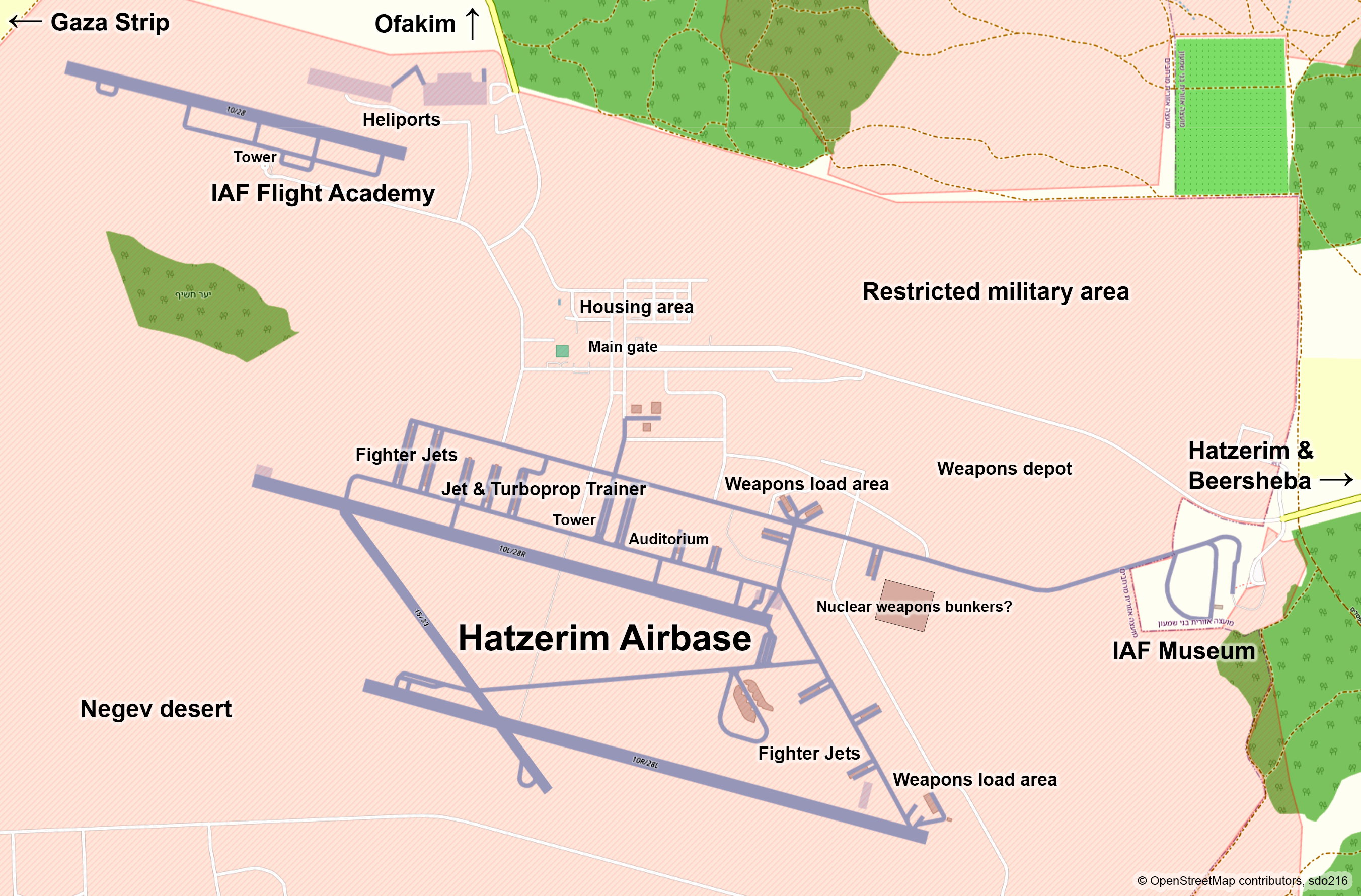

Site information
- Type: Airbase
- Owner: Israel Defense Forces
- Operator: Israeli Air Force

Location
- Shown within Israel Hatzerim Airbase (Israel)
- Coordinates: 31°14′00.09″N 34°39′45.21″E

Site history
- Built: 1960s
- In use: 1966 - present

Airfield information
- Identifiers: ICAO: LLHB
- Elevation: 220 metres (722 ft) AMSL
Runways
| Direction | Length and surface |
|---|---|
| 10R/28L | 2,750 metres (9,022 ft) Asphalt |
| 10L/28R | 2,440 metres (8,005 ft) Asphalt |
| 15/33 | 1,830 metres (6,004 ft) Asphalt |

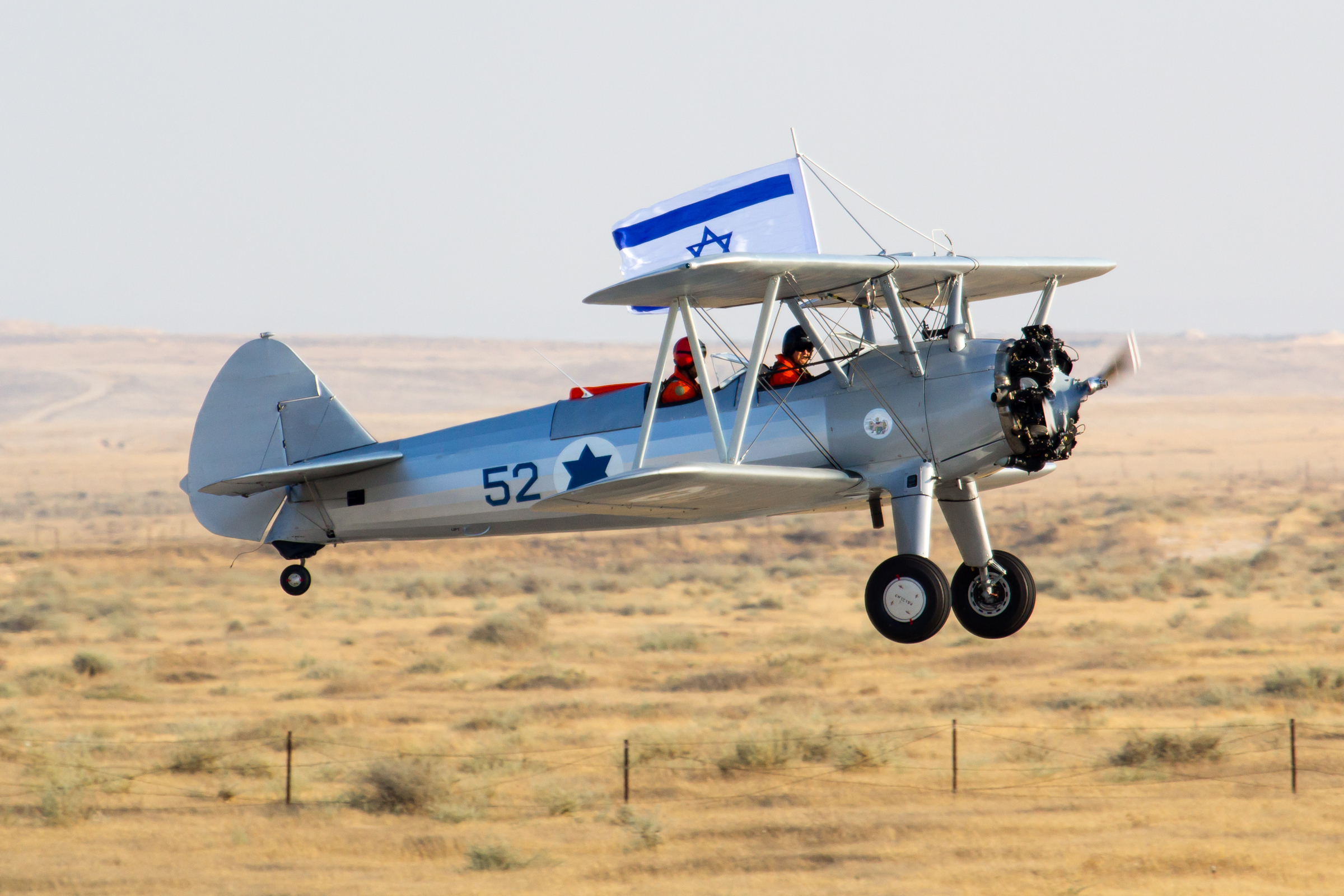
Israeli Air Force Boeing Stearman PT-17 Kaydet, a former military trainer aircraft, performing over Hatzerim AFB during an exhibition in June 2016

Hatzerim Airbase (Hebrew: בָּסִיס חֵיל-הַאֲוִויר חֲצֵרִים, Basis Heil HaAvir Hatzerim, lit. Homesteads) (ICAO: LLHB) is an Israeli Air Force (IAF) base on the northern edge of the Negev desert in the Southern District of Israel, 6 km west of Beersheba, near kibbutz Hatzerim. Apart from two squadrons of operational fighter jets, it houses the IAF Flight Academy, the IAF Aerobatic Team and – adjacent to the airbase – the IAF Museum (see map).

== History ==
Hatzerim Airbase was constructed during the 1960s and declared operational on 3 October 1966. It was the first IAF base built from the ground up, as a new base for the IAF, and not on existing base areas of the Royal Air Force.

From 1968 to 2015 there was a helicopter squadron here, most recently with UH-60 Black Hawk, which then moved to Palmachim Airbase. From 1969 until today there's the "Flying Tiger" Squadron with jet trainers at Hatzerim, which flew the TA-4H Skyhawk Ayit two-seater for many years (see photo down below), but also its one-seater fighter version A-4H/N.

=== Flight Academy and Aerobatic Team ===
After the base was opened, the IAF Flight Academy was relocated here from Tel Nof Airbase and has since then mainly used the northwestern part of the airfield and its runway for its propeller aircraft. Two-seat turboprop training aircraft, which are also flown by the IAF Aerobatic Team, are stationed on the much larger southern area with its three runways. The jet trainers are also located there, alongside operational IAF fighter jets. The northern area still has a heliport, but since the last helicopter squadron withdrew, it has only been used by the Flight Academy's training helicopters (see map).

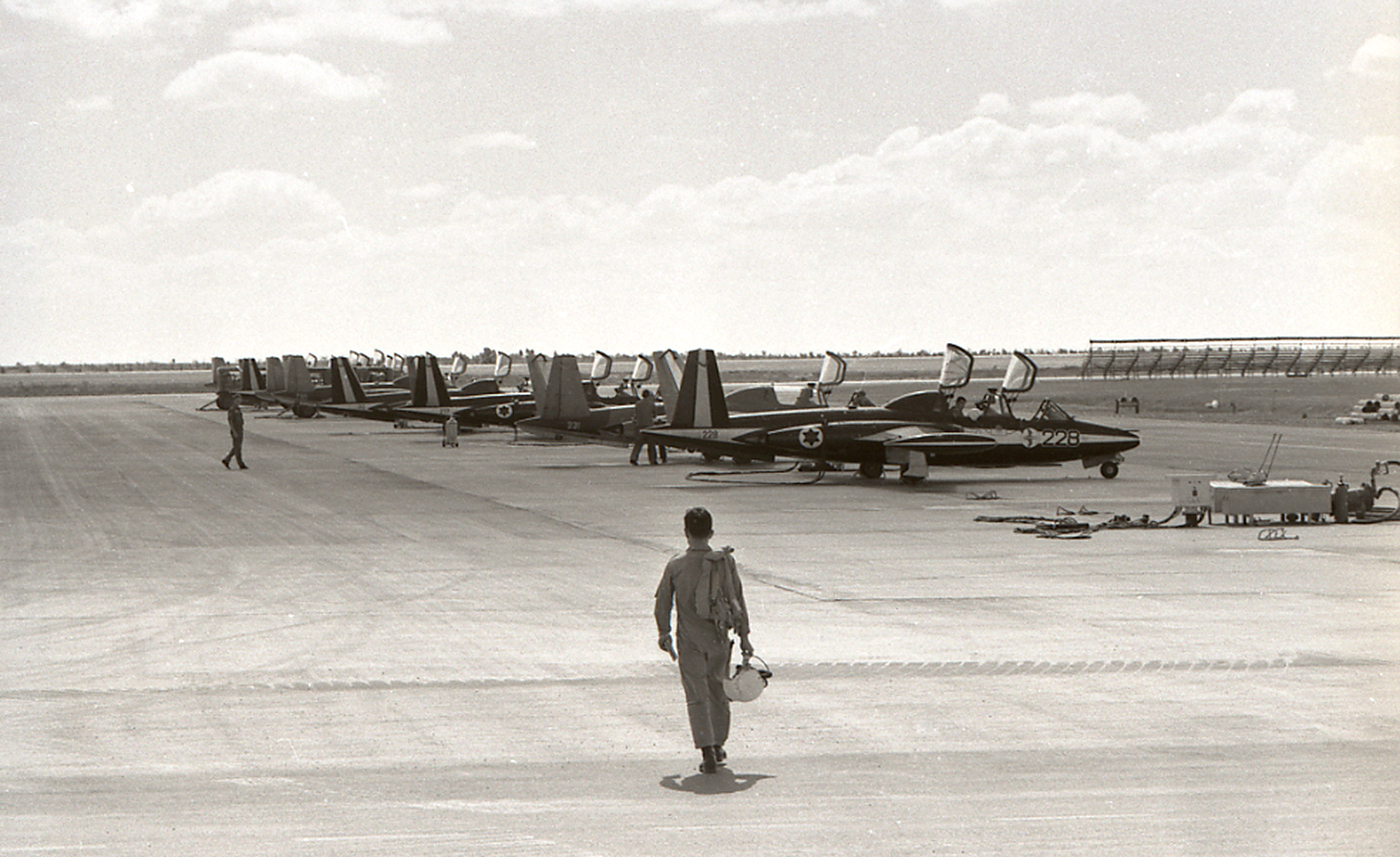
Machines and cadets of the IAF Flight Academy and the Aerobatic Team (white stripes) at the Hatzerim Airbase in 1969

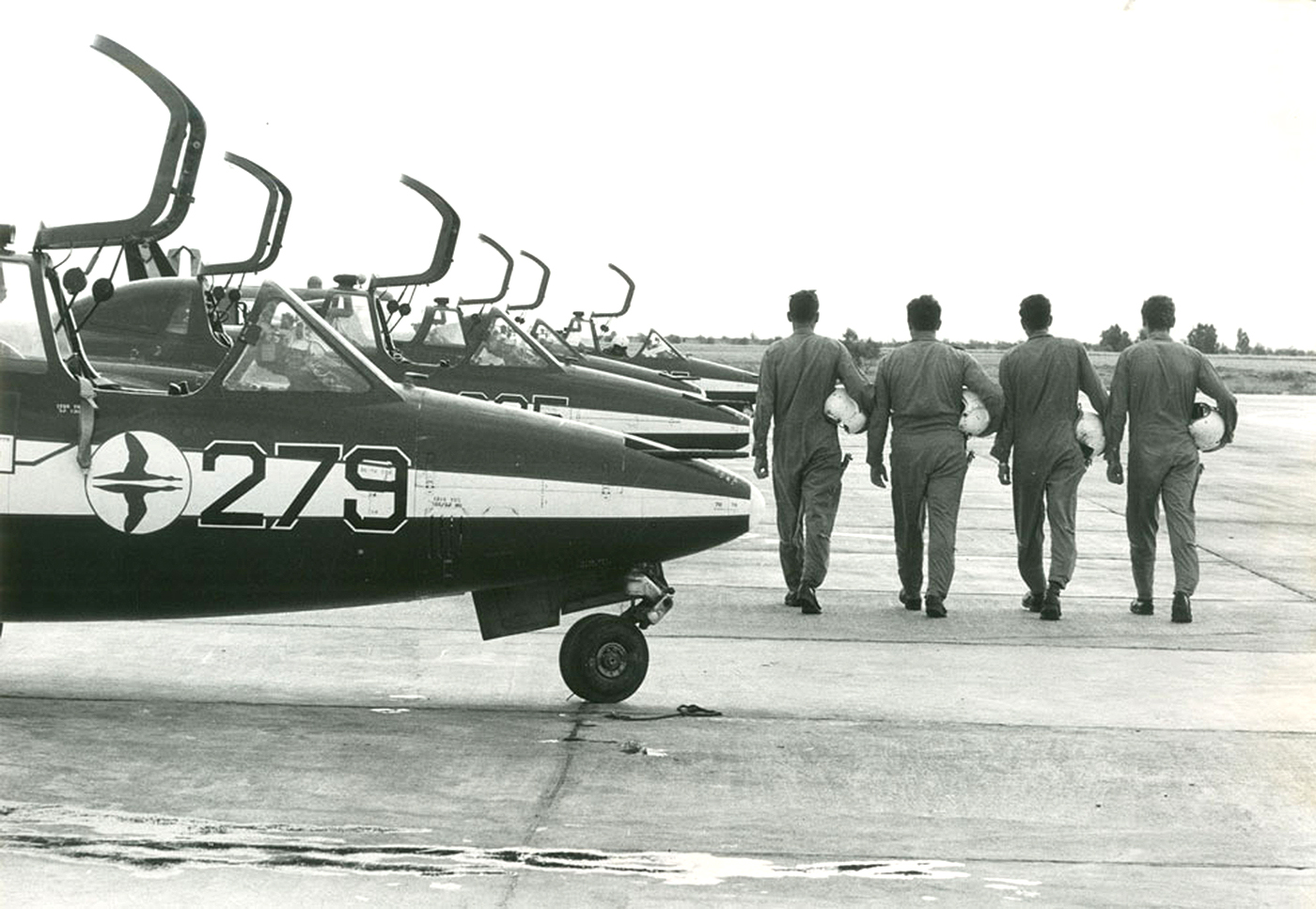
The four pilots and jets of the IAF Aerobatic Team (see double goose symbol) at the Hatzerim Airbase in 1976

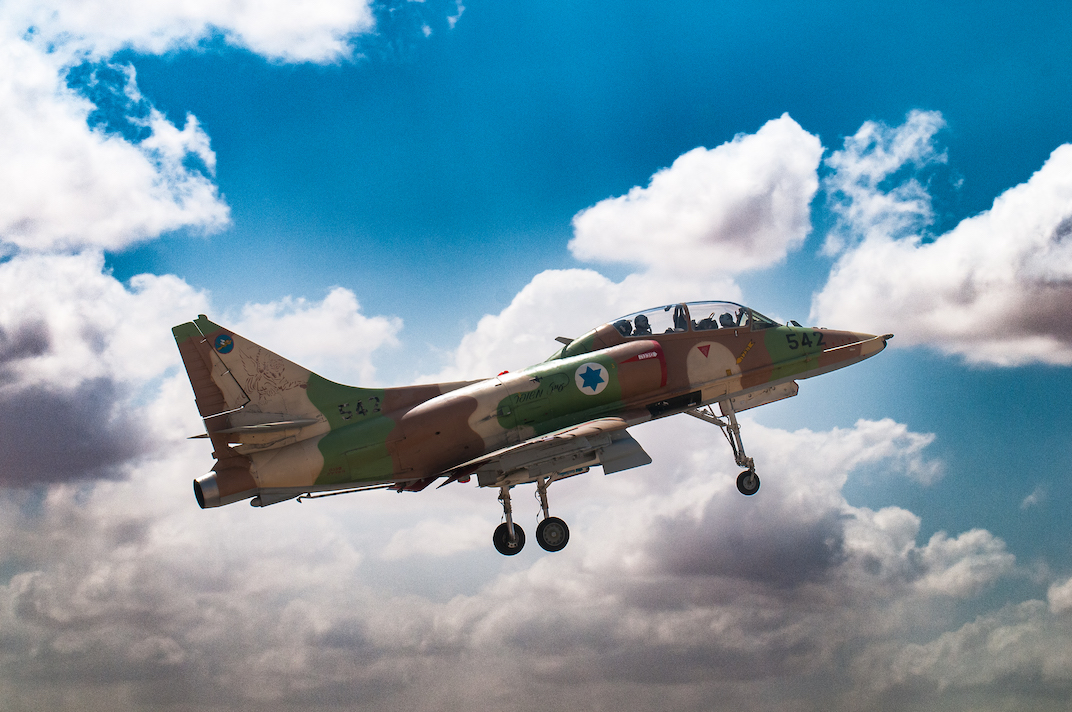
A TA-4H Skyhawk Ayit two-seater jet trainer of 102 Squadron "Flying Tiger" landing on Hatzerim Airbase in 2008

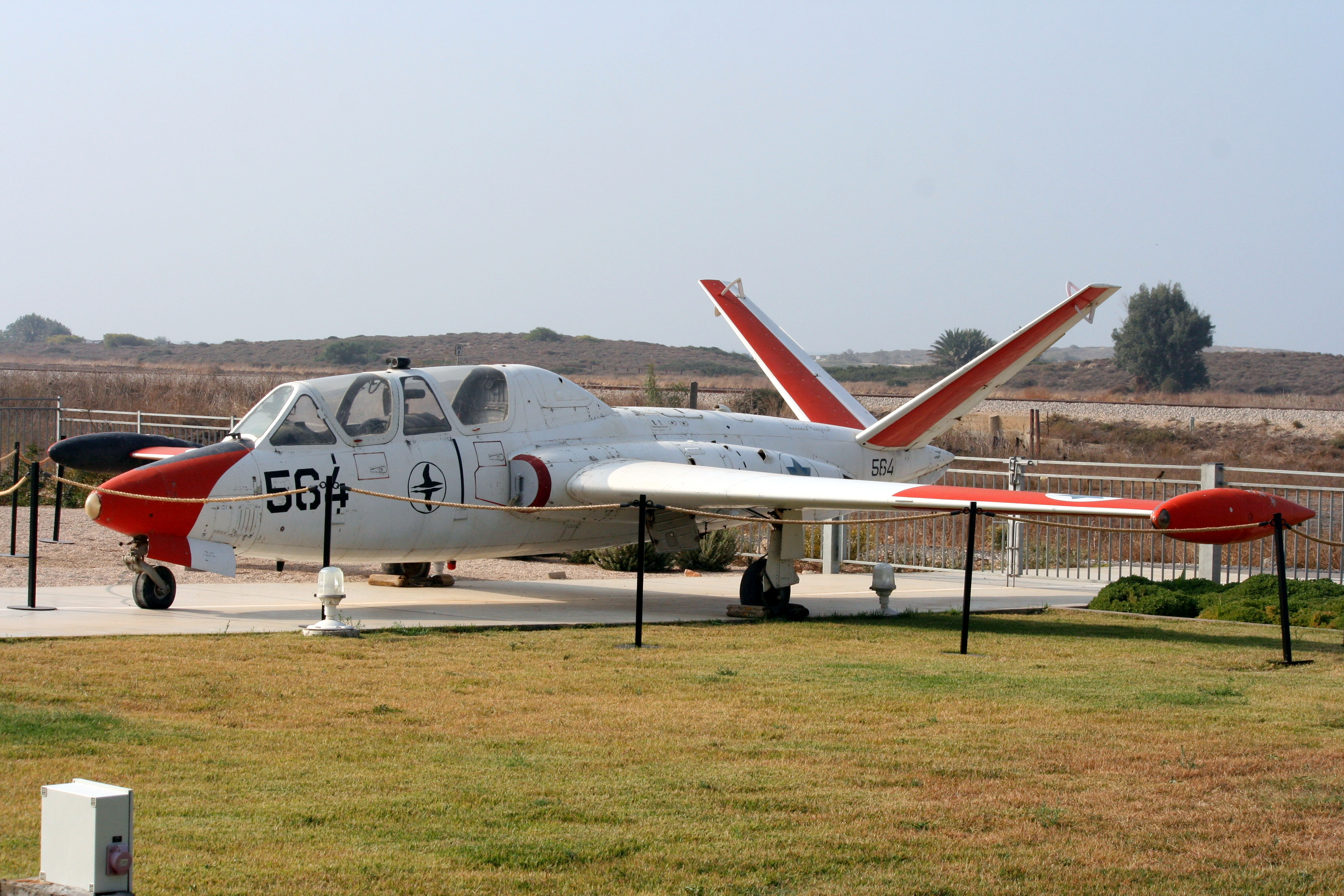
A retired Fouga CM.170 Magister Tzukit of the IAF Aerobatic Team (see double goose symbol) at HaBonim Airfield 2013

Symbol of the IAF Flight Academy

Symbol of the IAF Aerobatic Team

The Flight Academy had already flown the French two-seater Fouga CM.170 Magister Tzukit at Tel Nof Airbase since 1960, which it kept for a total of 50 years in different variants until it was decommissioned in 2010 and was also flown by the Aerobatic Team during this time. These Hatzerim aircraft were also used during the Six-Day War to carry out attacks on enemy radar stations and anti-aircraft artillery and also did close air support (CAS).

From 2010, the Flight Academy and the Aerobatic Team were equipped with the Beechcraft T-6 Texan II Efroni, a two-seat turboprop aircraft that has similar flight characteristics to a light jet and is ideal for both purposes. It is used in over a dozen Air Forces worldwide for training purposes.

At the end of May and end of November 2024, the Flight Academy received new AgustaWestland AW119Kx Ofer helicopters to train its IAF pilots. These are equipped with Israeli systems and replace the older Bell 206 Sayfan models dating back to the 1970s (see gallery below). A total of 12 new helicopters were purchased.

=== 69 Squadron "Hammers" ===
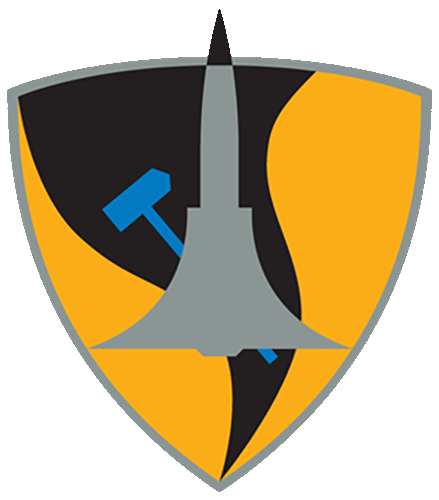

The 69 Squadron "Hammers" was founded in 1948 at Ramat David Airbase and relocated to Ekron Airbase (today: Tel Nof) in 1949. The squadron got its name from the B-17 Flying Fortress bombers used at the time (see B&W photo in gallery below). From 1969 it flew the F-4E Phantom II Kurnass, moved to Hatzerim Airbase in 1991 and received the F-15I Ra'am from 1998, which is derived from the F-15E Strike Eagle (see also "Units") of the USAF. The squadron at Hatzerim flies this aircraft to this day.

=== 102 Squadron "Flying Tiger" ===
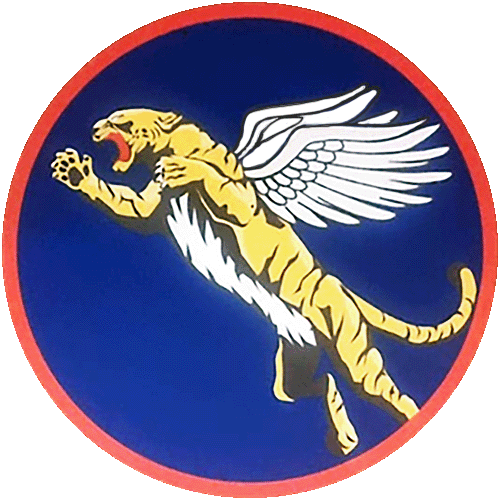

The 102 Squadron "Flying Tiger" was established on 29 December 1967, at Hatzor Airbase as the Israeli Air Force's (IAF) second A-4 squadron. It received its first Douglas A-4H Skyhawk Ayit aircraft on 13 June 1968 (see photo in gallery below). A few months later, the squadron flew its first combat missions during the War of Attrition across four theaters of operation: Egypt, Syria, Jordan, and Lebanon. In mid-1969, the squadron relocated to Hatzerim. It suffered heavy losses during the Yom Kippur War in October 1973. The squadron then participated in subsequent military conflicts in Lebanon and Syria. It was later also involved with the two-seater TA-4H jet trainer at the IAF Flight Academy (see photo above).

=== 107 Squadron "Knights Of The Orange Tail" ===
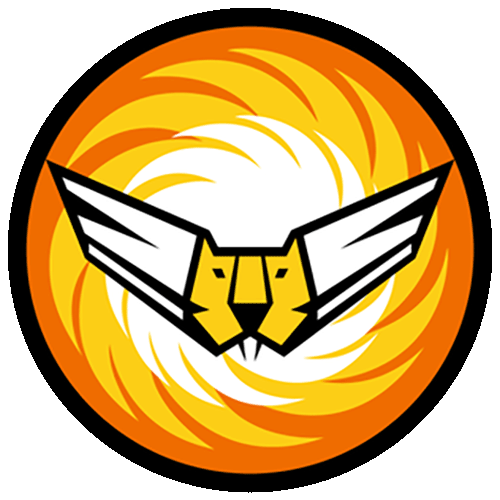

The 107 Squadron, which was founded in 1953 at Ramat David Airbase under a different name, was known as the "Knights Of The Orange Tail" Squadron from 1971 onwards at Hatzerim, where it flew the F-4E Phantom II Kurnass (see photo in gallery below). From 2006 it finally received the F-16I Sufa (see also "Units"), which was adapted to IAF needs and derived from the two-seat F-16D Block 50/52 Plus from the USAF. The squadron at Hatzerim flies this aircraft to this day.

=== Gallery of former aircraft ===
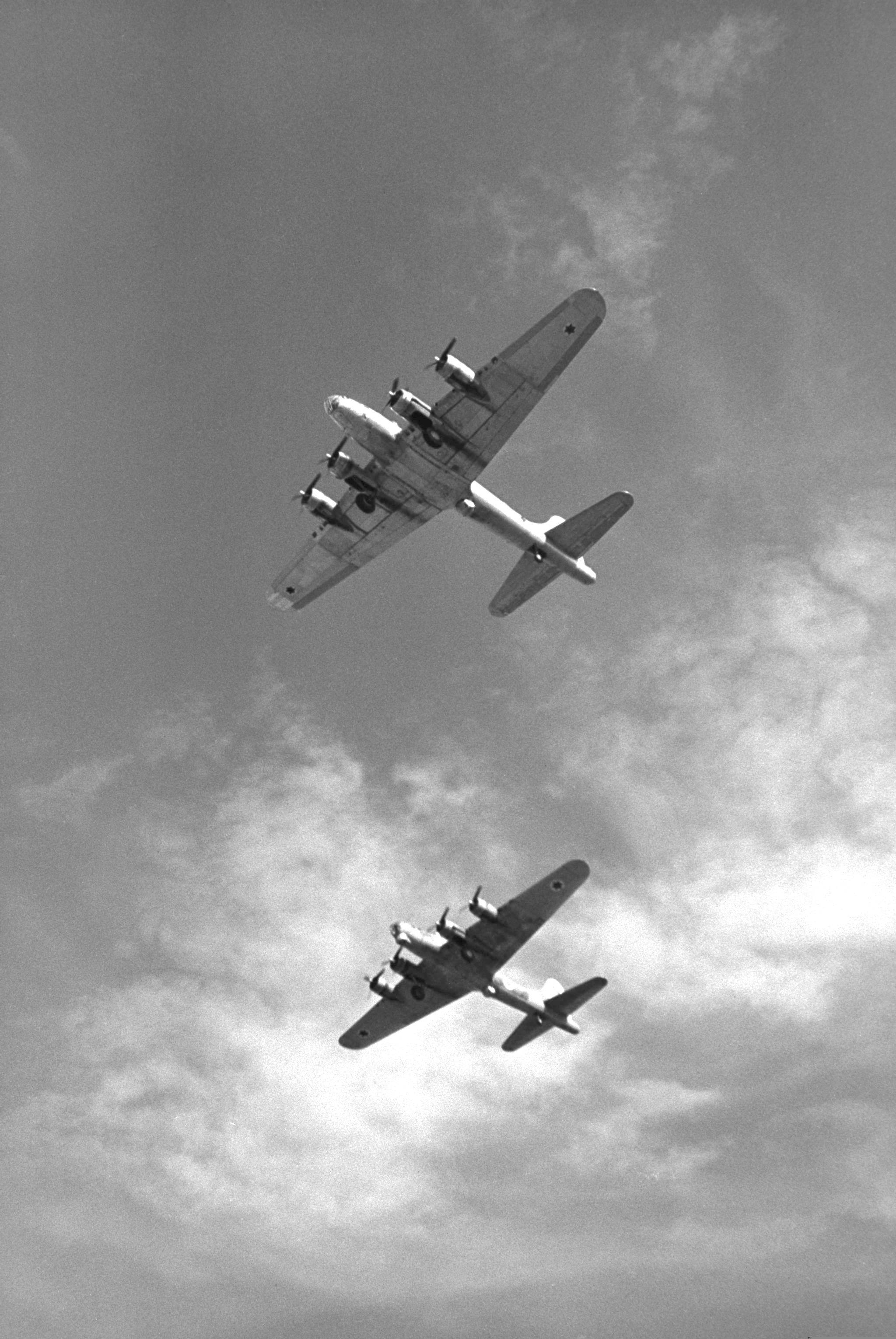
Israeli B-17 Flying Fortress bombers of 69 Squadron "Hammers" of Tel Nof Airbase in 1953 – the 69 Squadron moved to Hatzerim Airbase in 1991

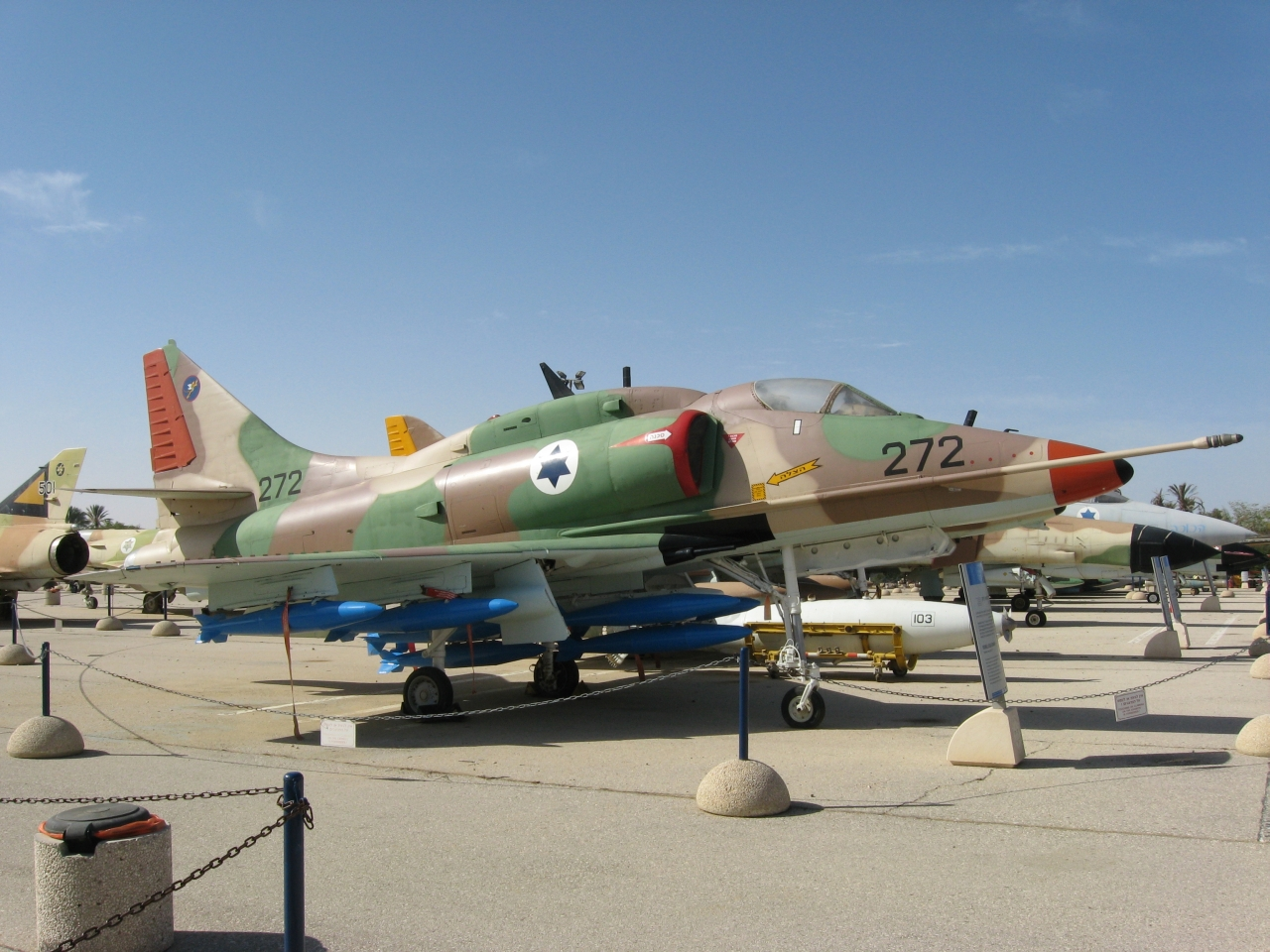
A retired A-4H Skyhawk Ayit of 102 Squadron "Flying Tiger" at the Israeli Air Force Museum – adjacent to Hatzerim Airbase

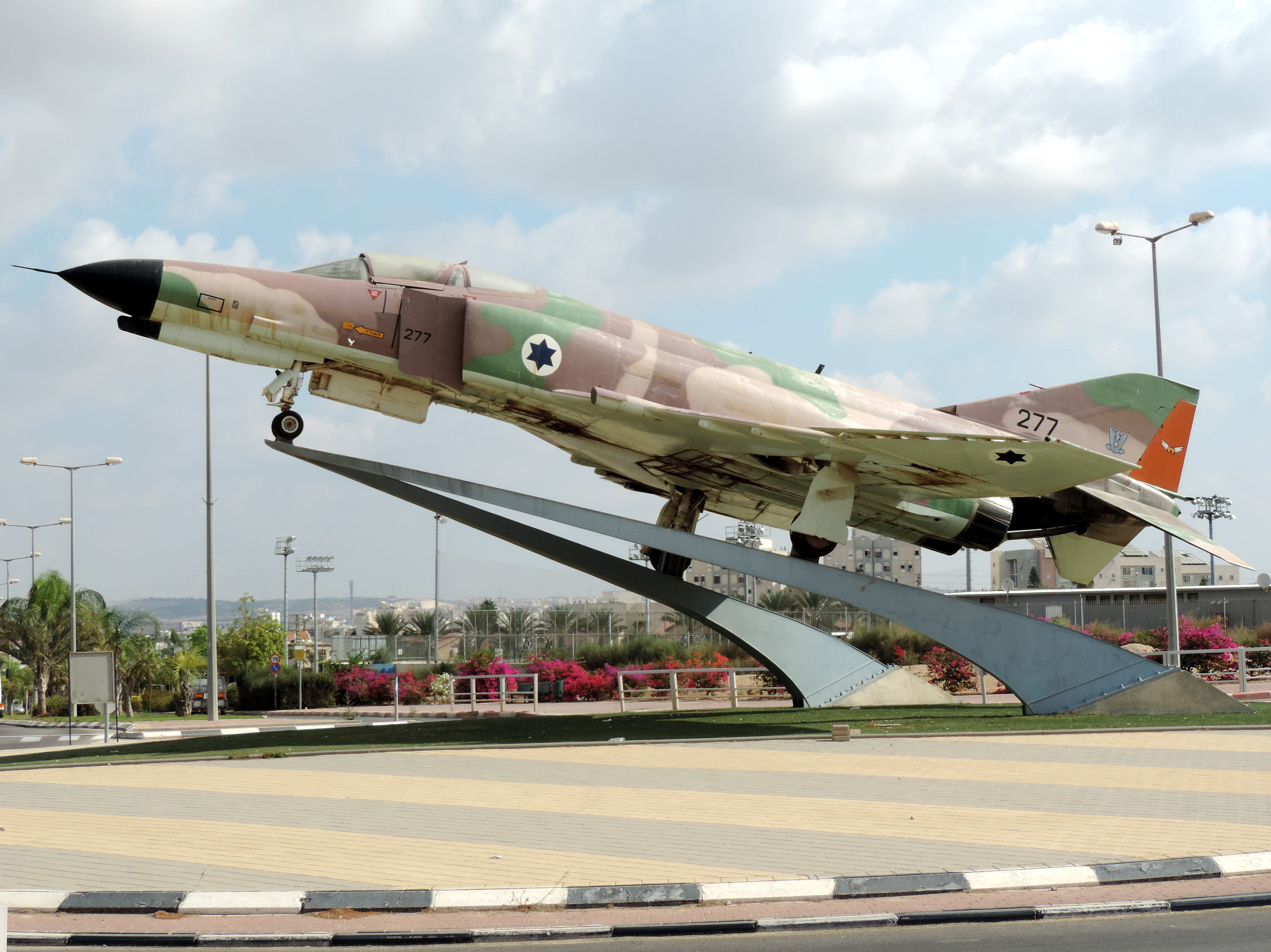
An F-4E Phantom II Kurnass of the 107 Squadron "Knights Of The Orange Tail" – at the Ilan-Ramon-Square roundabout in Beersheba

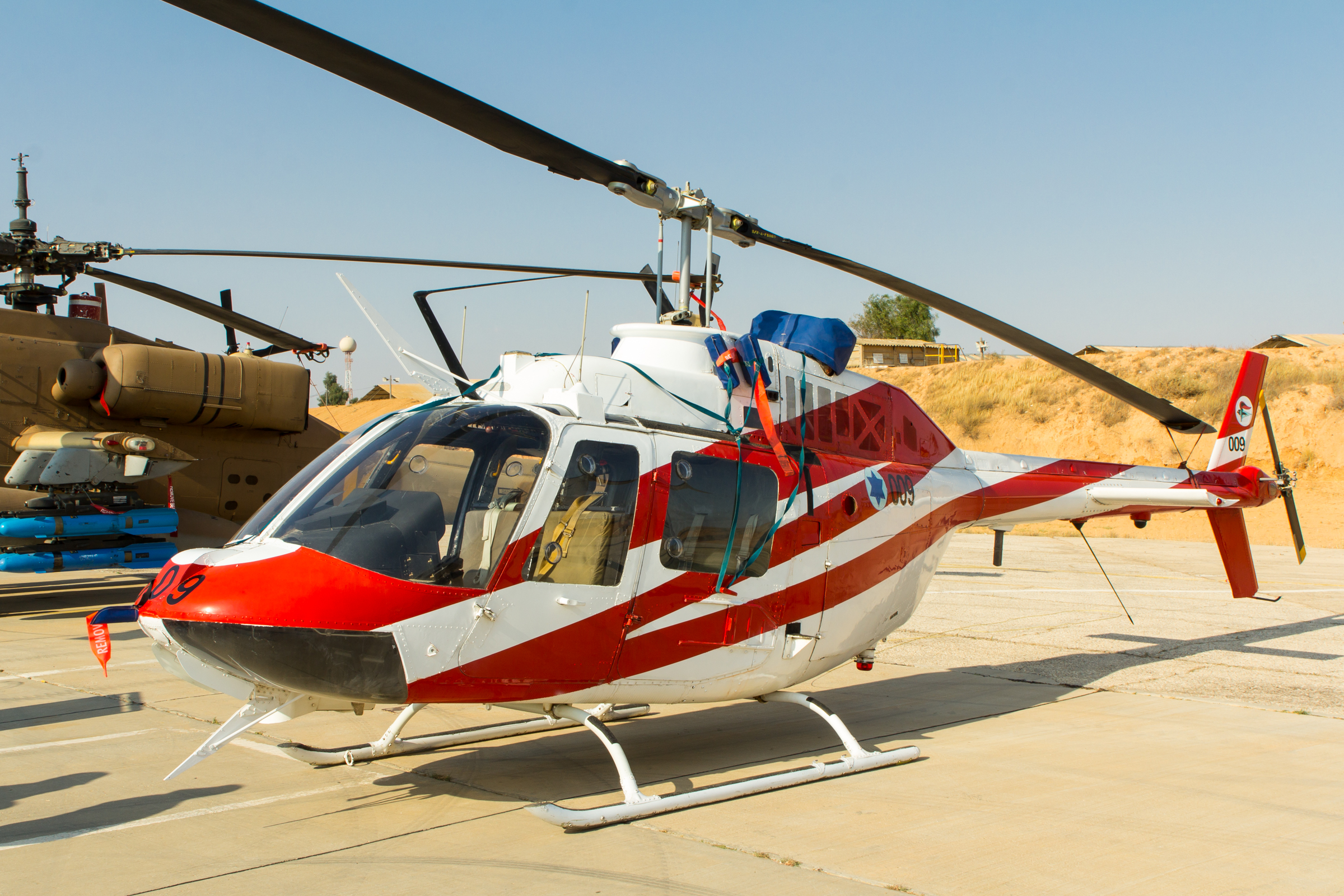
A Bell 206 Sayfan once used for helicopter training of the IAF Flight Academy – at an exhibition 2016 at Hatzerim Airbase

=== Operation Outside the Box ===
On 6 September 2007, four F-15Is of the "Hammers" Squadron at Hatzerim and four F-16Is of Ramon Airbase flew an attack on an almost completed nuclear reactor in Syria under the code name Operation Outside the Box and destroyed it. It was only more than 10 years later that Israel officially acknowledged the attack. They wanted to prevent Syria from building atomic bombs from the nuclear material obtained (see photo of the destroyed reactor in the gallery directly below).

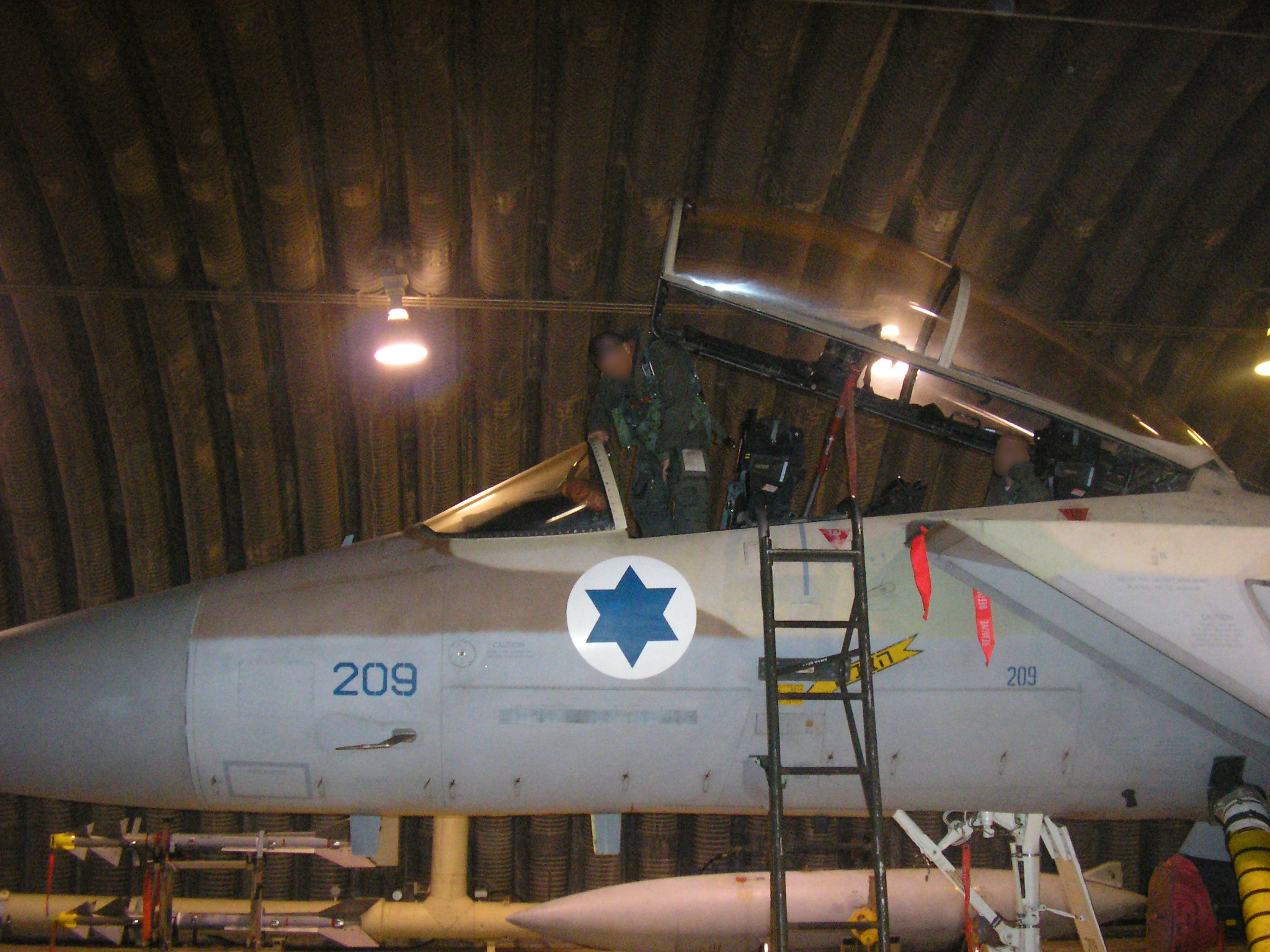
Pilot and navigator of an F-15I Ra'am are preparing for Operation Outside the Box at Hatzerim Airbase

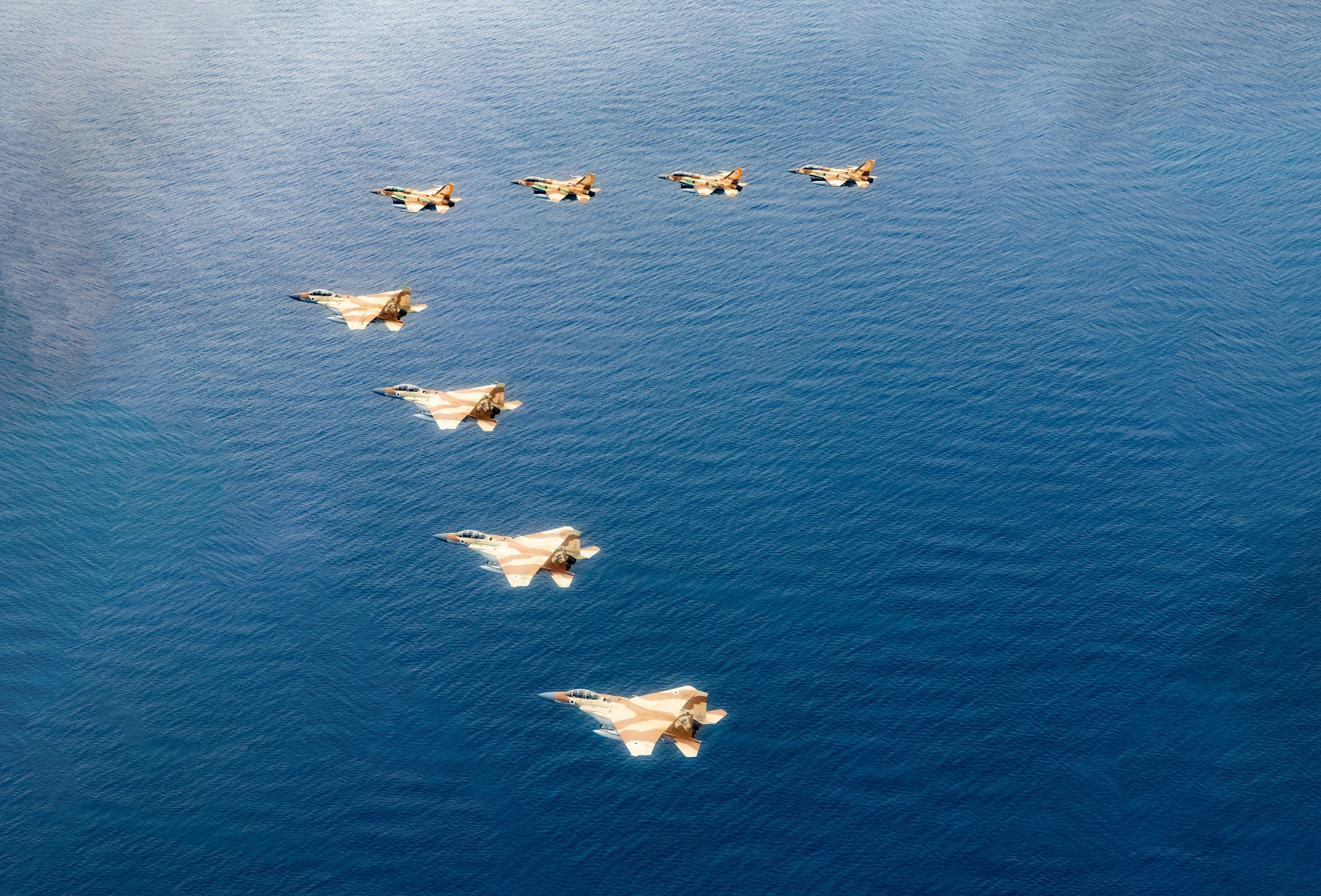
F-15I Ra'am (below) and F-16I Sufa over the Mediterranean Sea in 2021 like in Operation Outside the Box

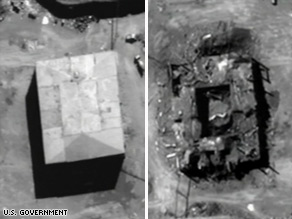
The Syrian nuclear reactor destroyed by Operation Outside the Box in 2007

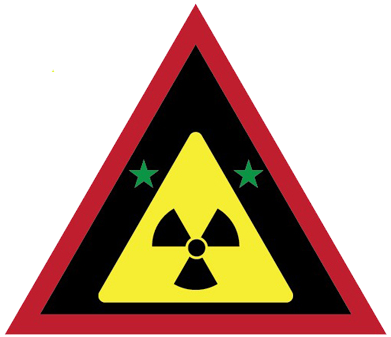
The badge of Operation Outside the Box, which was only applied to the participating fighter jets in 2018

== Current ==
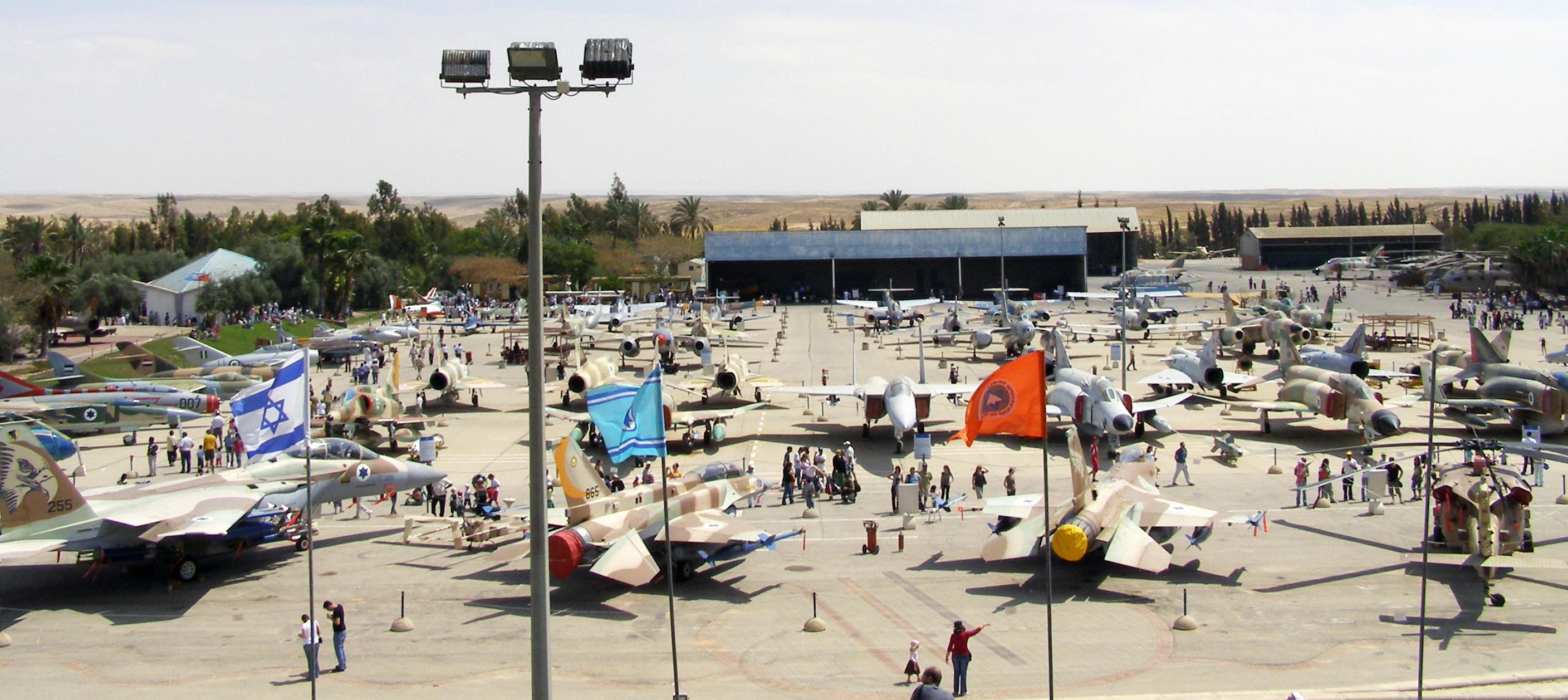
The IAF Museum with a wide range of historic military aircraft types in the background and a line of operational aircraft in the foreground on Independence Day in Israel, May 2008

In addition to two squadrons with operational fighter jets, the base also houses the IAF Flight Academy, the IAF Aerobatic Team and – outside the security area – the IAF Museum. The Flight Academy trains prospective pilots on the German Grob G 120A-I Snunit, the AgustaWestland AW119Kx Ofer helicopter, the Beechcraft King Air Tzofit transport aircraft, the Italian M-346 Lavi jet trainer and other aircraft (see also "Units").

All pilots in the Aerobatic Team also work as instructors at the Flight Academy and fly the same machines in both facilities, currently T-6 Texan II Efroni turboprop two-seater. Four of the Texan IIs are specially equipped for the Aerobatic Team: they have a smoke generator to create colored smoke and wear the "double goose symbol" of the team on their fuselage (see pictures in gallery below of the four airplanes).

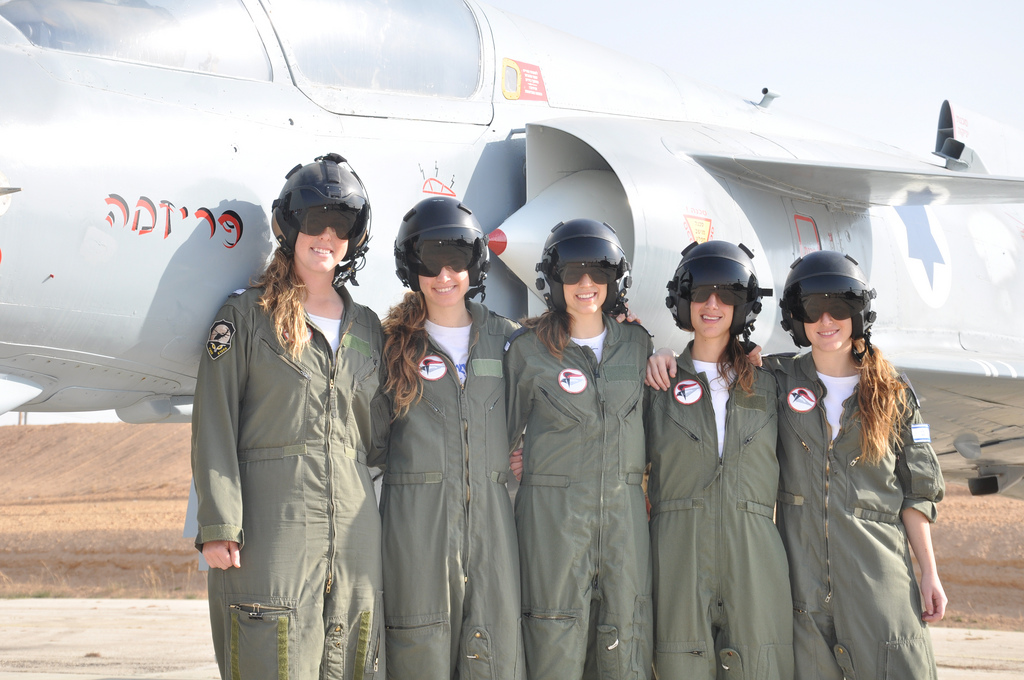
Five aspiring female pilots from the IAF Flight Academy in 2011, a retired IAI Kfir jet behind

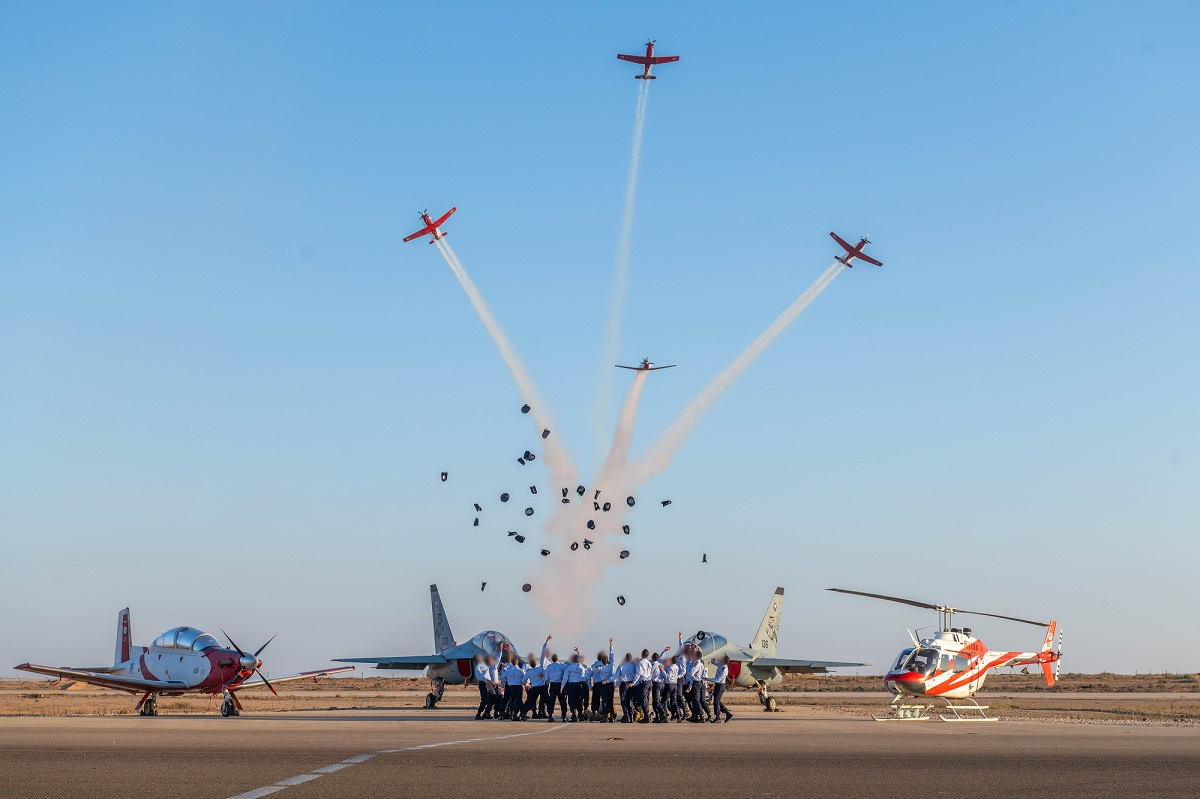
Cadet graduation ceremony at Hatzerim Airbase in June 2023

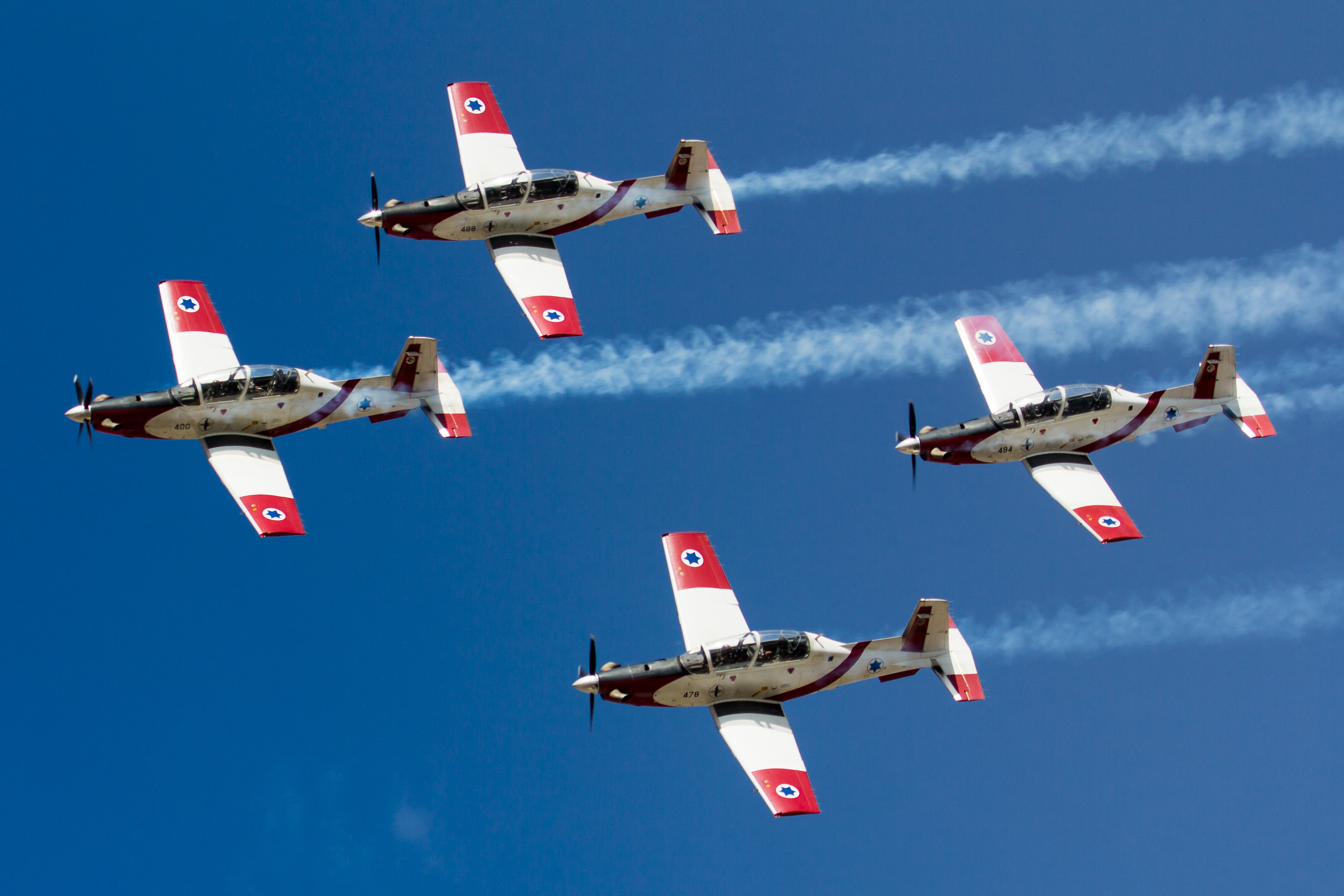
The IAF Aerobatic Team with their four T-6 Texan II Efroni (see double goose symbol) with white smoke

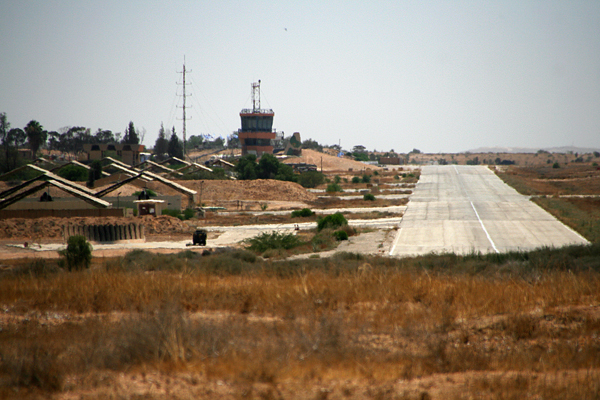
ATC Tower near the apron of the southern area at Hatzerim Airbase in 2010

Since 2021, a new building has been under construction next to the base for the IAF’s technical school, which will then relocate here from Haifa Airport.

=== Nuclear weapons ===
Hatzerim, beside Tel Nof Airbase and Sdot Micha Airbase, is believed to play a role in Israel's nuclear deterrence, as the base is home to F-15 fighter jets capable of carrying nuclear weapons over long distances – as the Bulletin of the Atomic Scientists, among others, suspects. It is unknown whether such weapons are also stored at Hatzerim other than at Tel Nof and in the depots at Sdot Micha. However, the newer type of F-15I Ra'am, which is based on Hatzerim only, is better suited to carry these weapons than the older models of the F-15 at Tel Nof. The F-16I Sufa stationed here could also be intended for this purpose as the Bulletin also writes.

A few hundred meters east of the central runway, lies an additional fenced and secured rectangular area − within the base with two earth-covered bunkers – that could serve as a nuclear weapons storage facility and from where the F-15I and F-16I fighter jets could be equipped with such weapons (see map and current satellite images: 31°14′10″N 34°40′44″E). Since normal weapons depots within bases are not so extensively secured, there is much to be said for a nuclear weapons depot, and one can assume that this was set up so conspicuously as a deterrent, even though Israel has not yet admitted that it has nuclear weapons.

=== F-15I+ and F-15IA ===
The 25 jets of the F-15I Ra'am from the "Hammers" Squadron on Hatzerim are to be upgraded from 2031 on as F-15I+ to the latest standard, they will receive the same avionics and systems as the new Boeing F-15EX Eagle II of the USAF. At the same time, the even older F-15A/B/C/D models at Tel Nof Airbase will be replaced by 50 new F-15IA (Israel Advanced) – the Israeli variant of the F-15EX. The renewal of the F-15 jets had been delayed for a long time – on the one hand for budgetary reasons, and on the other hand because of the political instability in recent years.

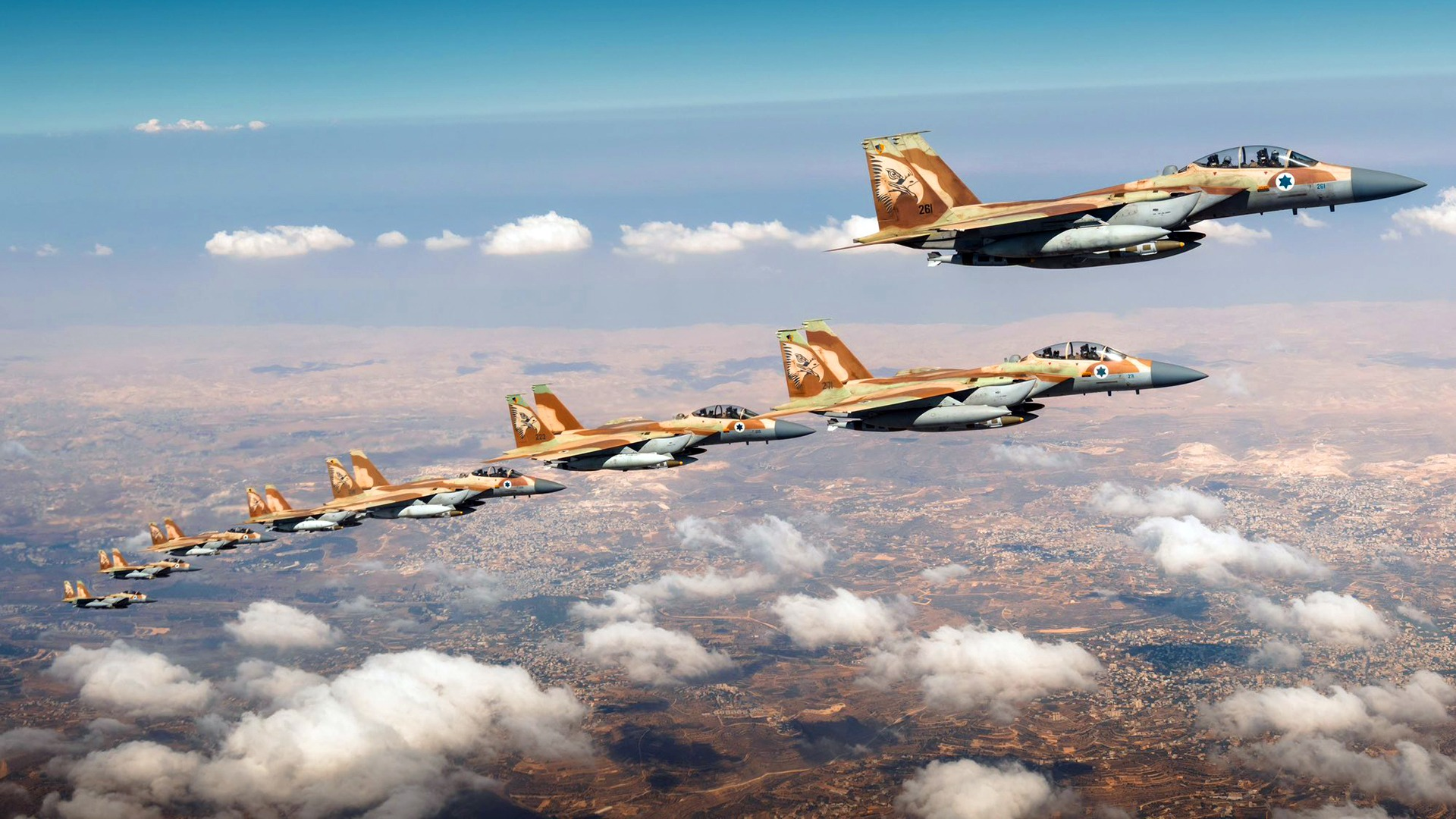
Eight F-15I Ra'am strike fighter jets of 69 Squadron "Hammers" at Hatzerim high above Israel in June 2025 during the Twelve-Day War between Iran and Israel

=== 2023 Hamas attack ===
During Hamas' attack on Israel on 7 October 2023, armed Palestinians came within a few kilometers of the airbase, which is about 25 kilometers from the Gaza Strip. Since it was initially not known how the situation would develop, the fighter jets at Hatzerim had already been prepared for evacuation. The Hamas' fighters had already invaded the town of Ofakim, north of the airbase, killed residents or taken them hostage and were only driven out or killed by the IDF the following day after fierce fighting.

== Units ==
- 69 Squadron "Hammers" – operating the F-15I Ra'am strike fighter jet
- 102 Squadron "Flying Tiger" – operating the M-346 Lavi jet trainer for the Flight Academy
- 107 Squadron "Knights Of The Orange Tail" – operating the F-16I Sufa strike fighter jet
- IAF Flight Academy – operating the Grob G 120A-I Snunit, AgustaWestland AW119Kx Ofer, Beechcraft King Air Tzofit and others
- IAF Aerobatic Team – operating the T-6 Texan II Efroni turboprop two-seater together with the Flight Academy
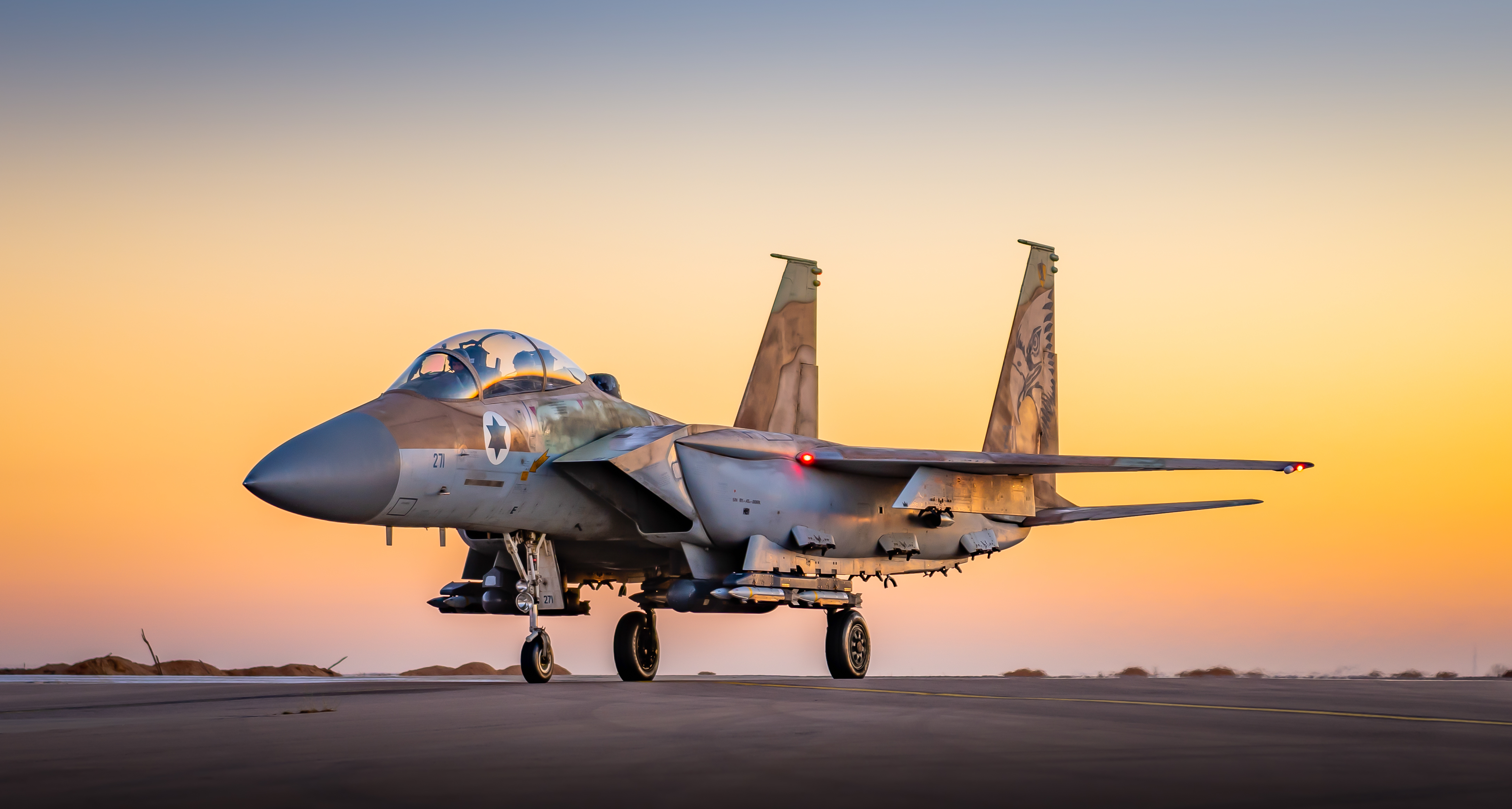
An F-15I Ra'am of 69 Squadron "Hammers" in May 2021 during Operation Guardian of the Walls

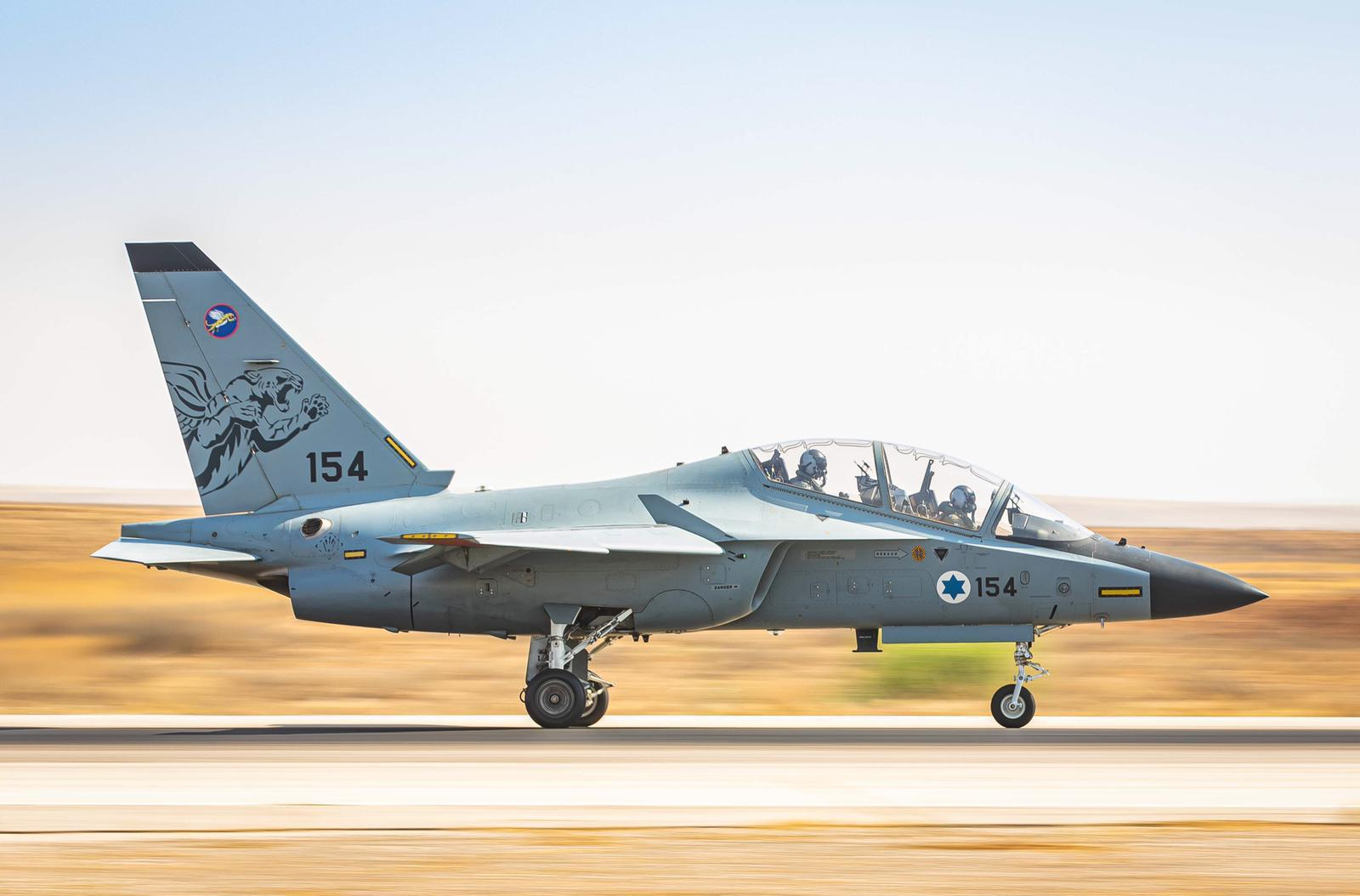
An Italian-built M-346 Lavi jet trainer of 102 Squadron "Flying Tiger" on the runway of Hatzerim Airbase in 2019

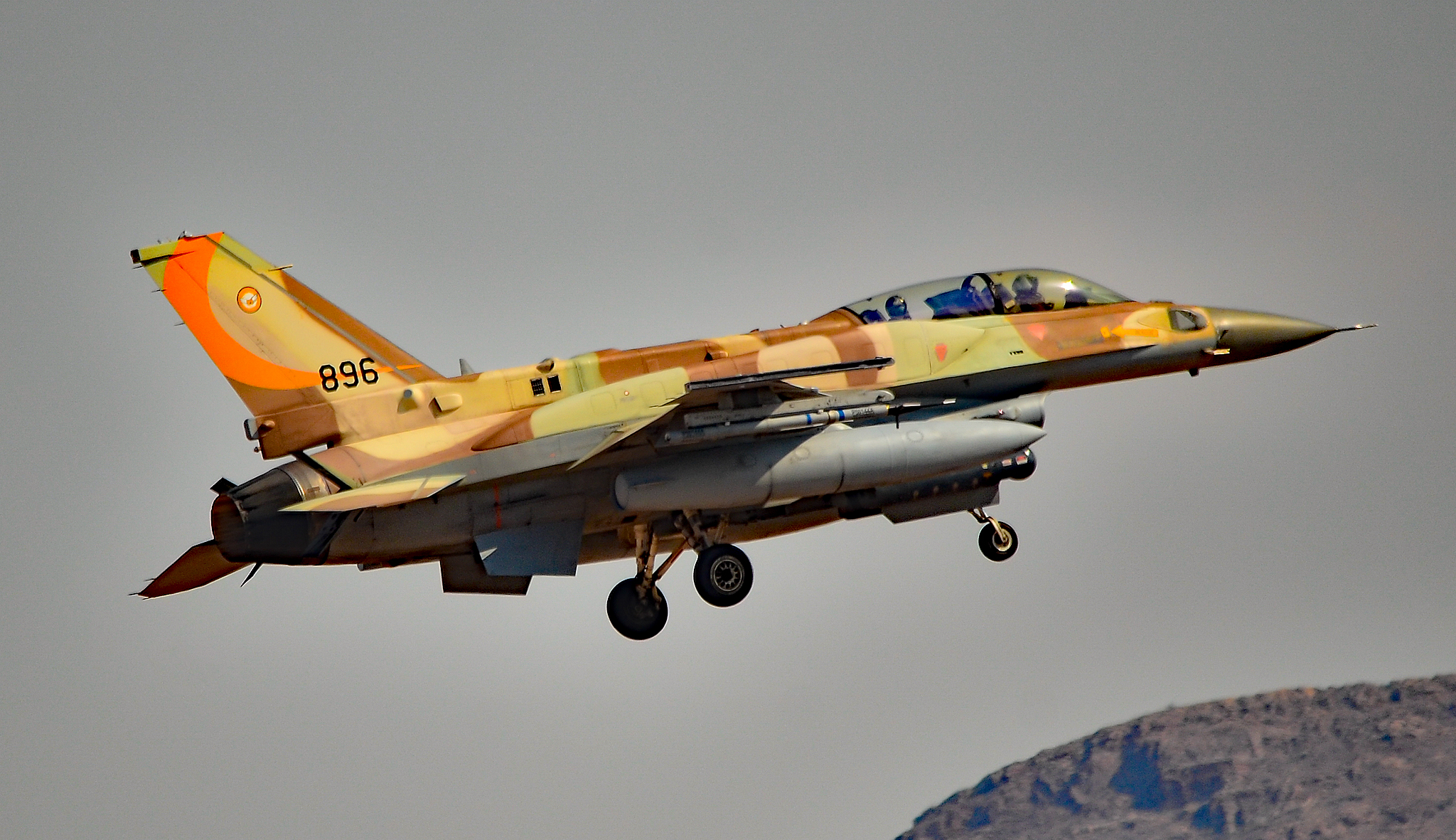
F-16I Sufa of 107 Squadron "Knights Of The Orange Tail" during an air force exercise in the USA in 2016

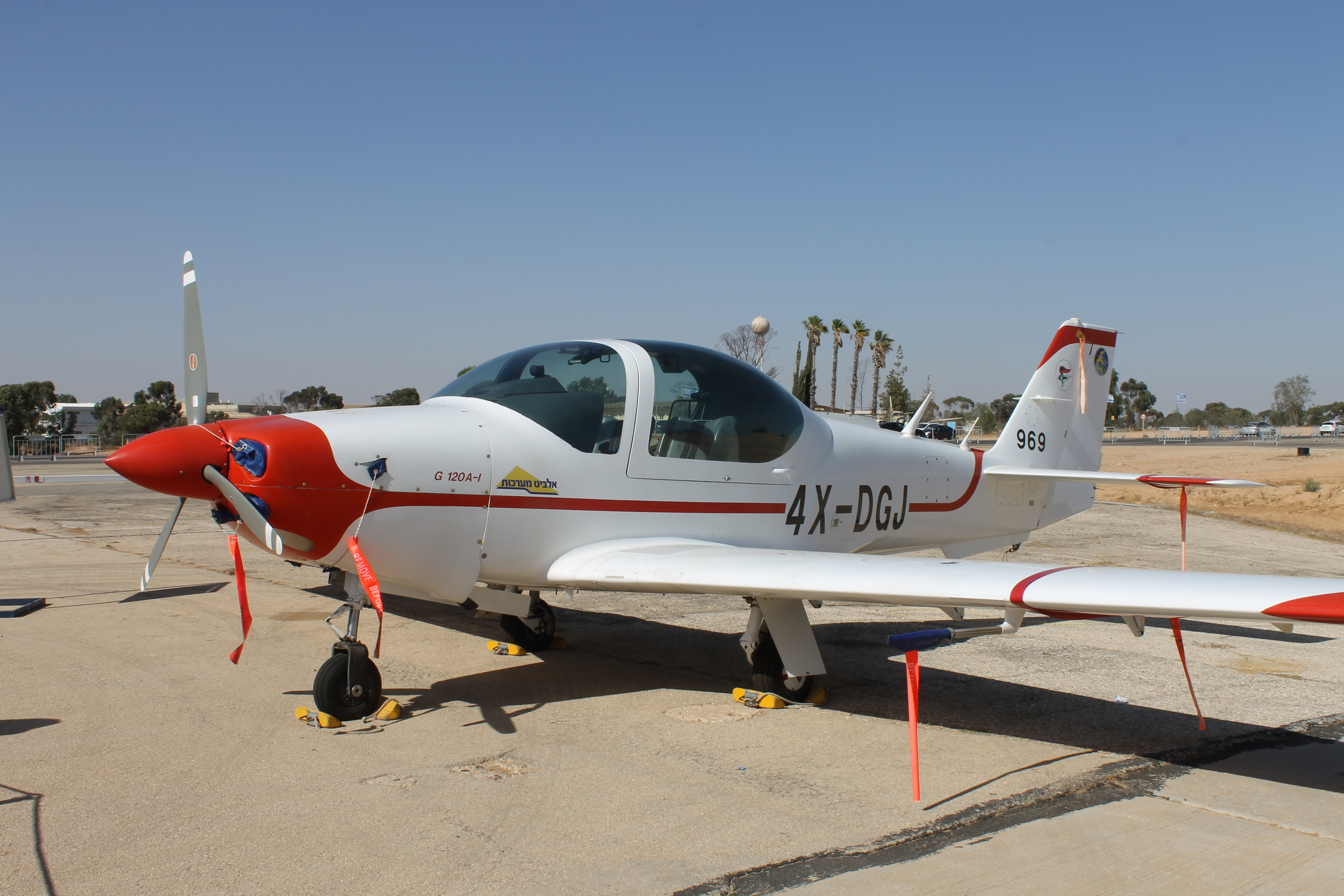
A German-built Grob G 120A-I Snunit of the IAF Flight Academy in 2012 at Hatzerim Airbase

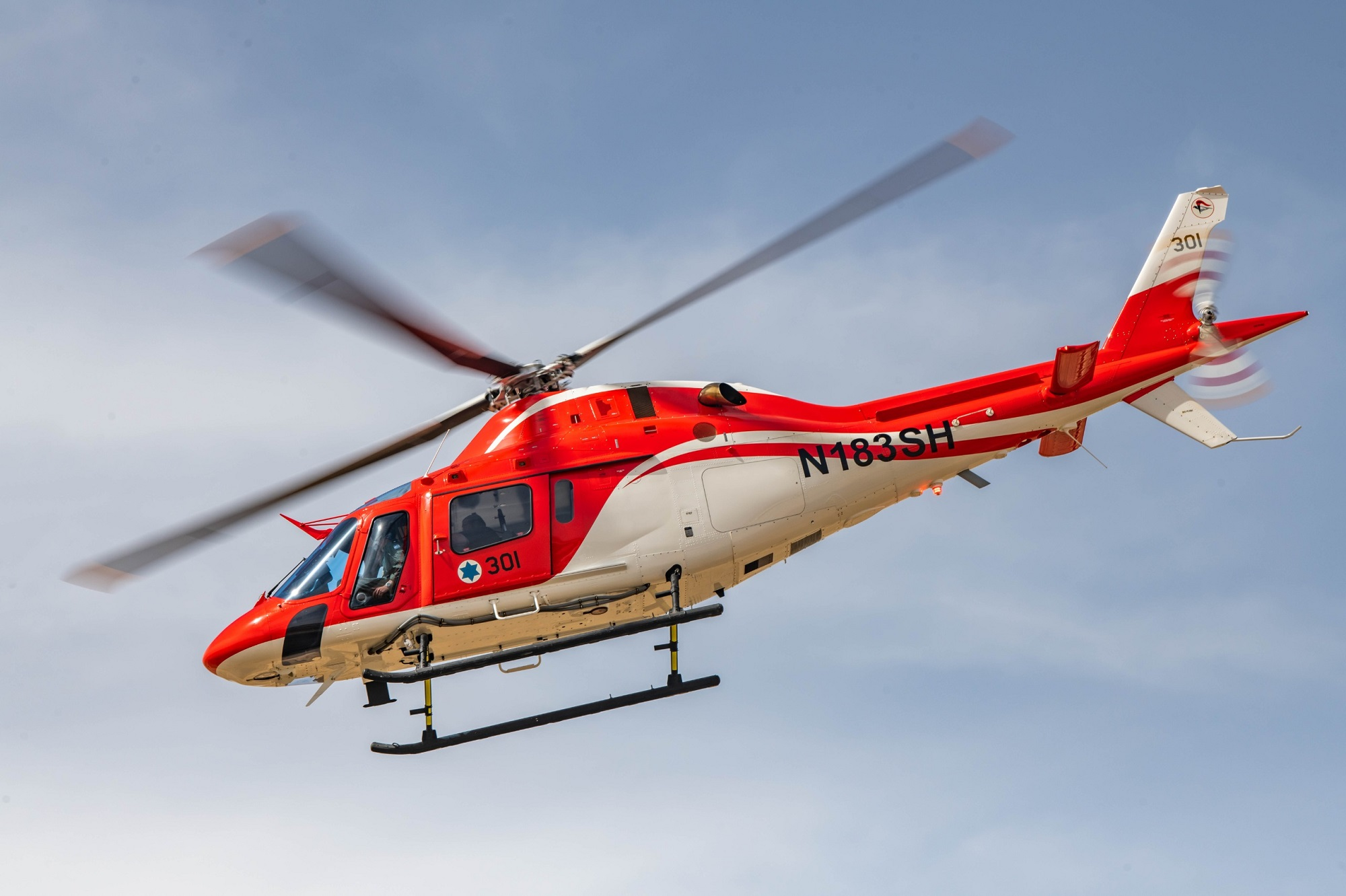
An AgustaWestland AW119Kx Ofer for helicopter training of the IAF Flight Academy in 2024

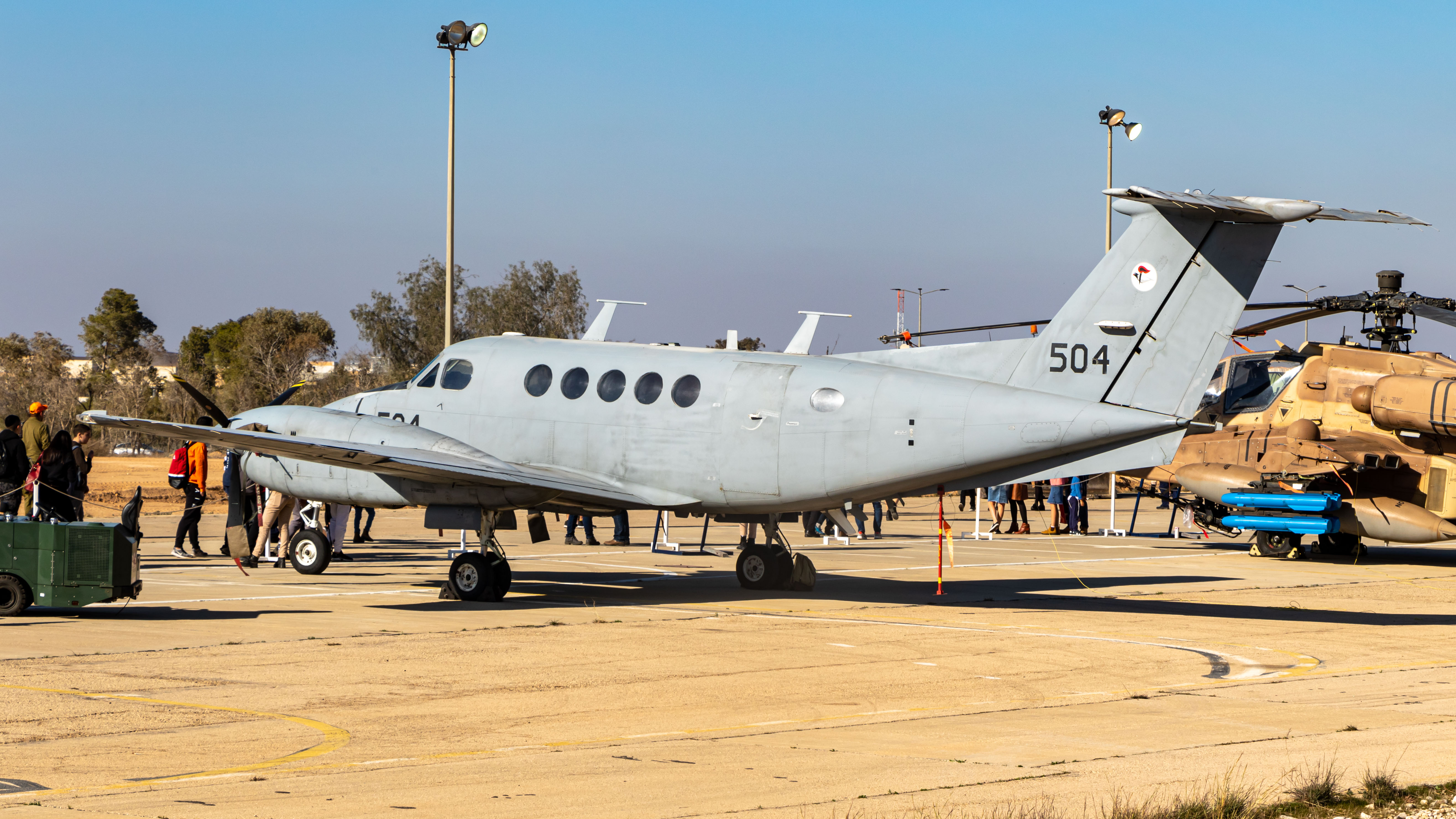
A King Air Tzofit of the IAF Flight Academy (see symbol on tail) during an exhibition in 2019 at Hatzerim

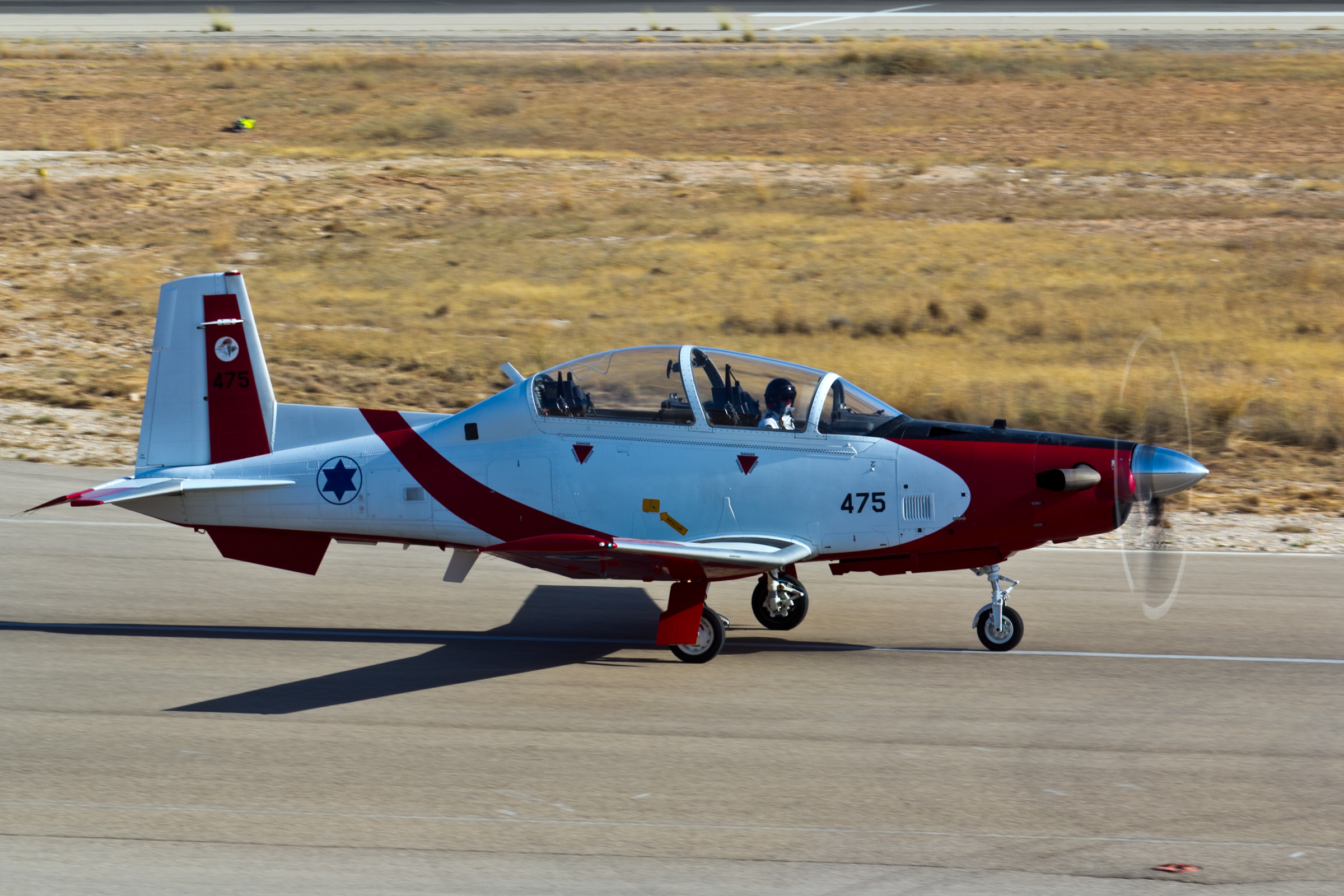
Two-seated T-6 Texan II Efroni of the IAF Flight Academy

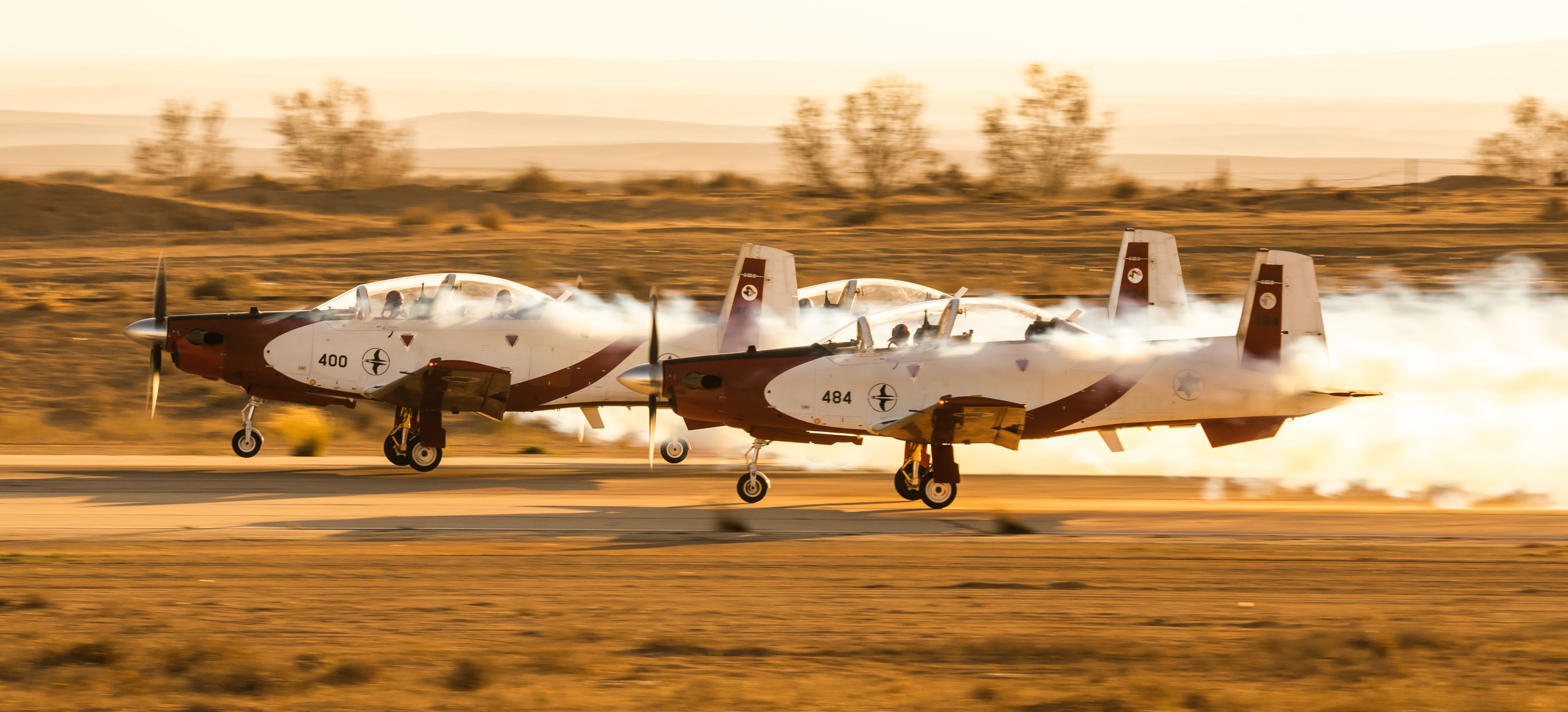
T-6 Texan II Efroni of the IAF Aerobatic Team with smoke generators

Note: IAF aircraft can usually be assigned to their squadron by the symbols on the tail

== Accidents ==
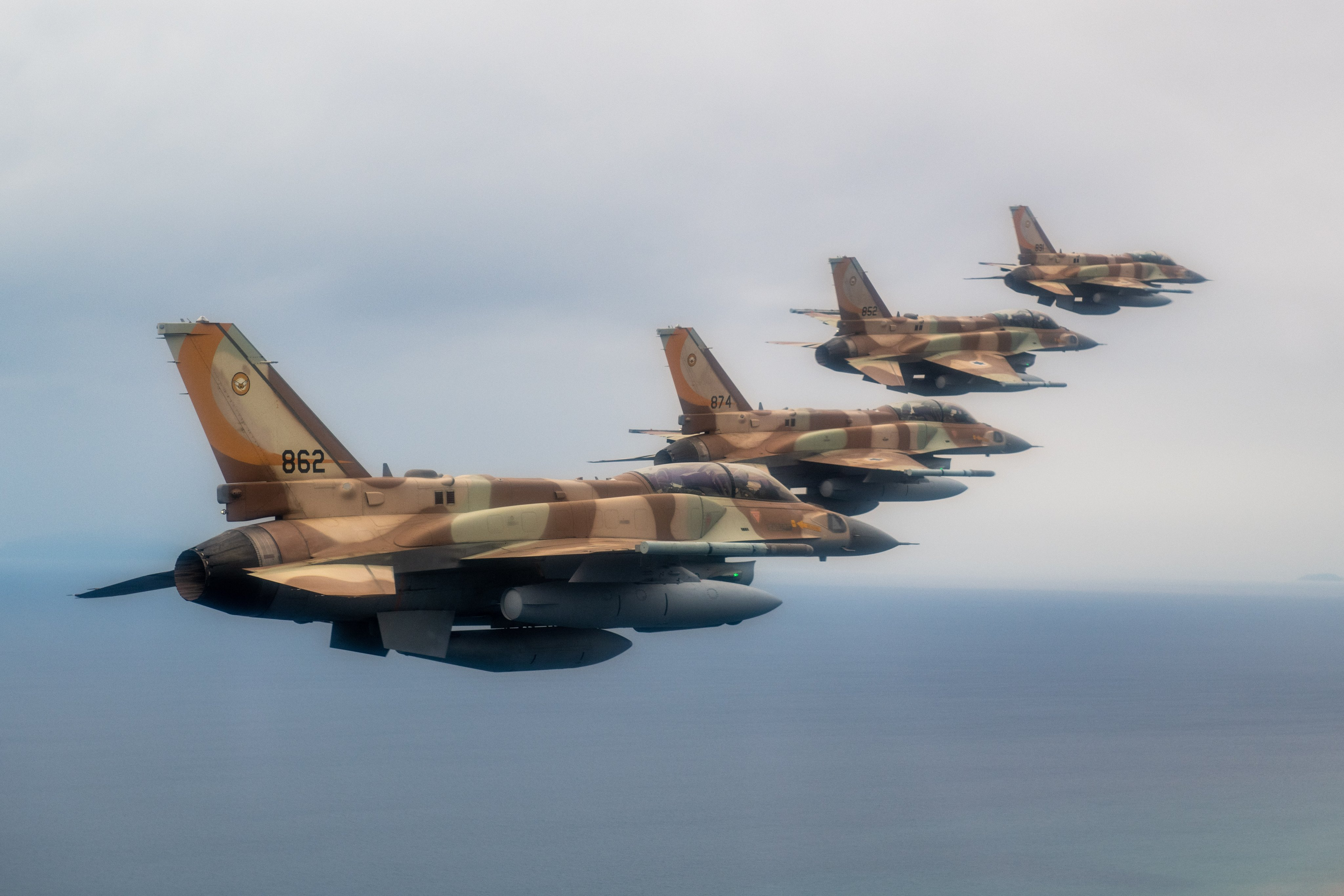
Four F-16I Sufa of 107 Squadron "Knights Of The Orange Tail" above the Mediterranean Sea in 2021

=== Crash of an F-16I Sufa ===
On 7 July 2013, four F-16I Sufa of the 107 Squadron "Knights Of The Orange Tail" were practicing air combat over the Mediterranean Sea when one of the planes' engines suddenly stopped working. After all attempts to restart it failed, the pilot and navigator ejected and were rescued. About a week later, the jet was recovered and the engine was thoroughly examined. A fundamental problem was eventually found, after which an improvement was implemented on all other engines of this type, even worldwide.

=== Crash of a Grob G 120A-I Snunit ===
On 24 November 2020, a Grob G 120A-I Snunit from the IAF Flight Academy crashed during a training flight in an open field near Kibbutz Mishmar HaNegev 15 kilometers north of the base. The 42-year-old flight instructor and his 19-year-old student pilot were killed. In March of the following year, after extensive investigations, the IDF announced that the accident had been caused by a stall at too low an altitude, which means human error. The remaining 15 aircraft of this type from Germany at Hatzerim were banned from taking off for a month after the crash. It was the first fatal incident of its kind since 2008, when a flight instructor and a student died on board another type of training aircraft.

== See also ==
- Israeli Air Force
- List of airports in Israel
- Nuclear weapons of Israel
