= Eitan Ben Eliyahu =

Israeli Air Force general

- איתן בן-אליהו
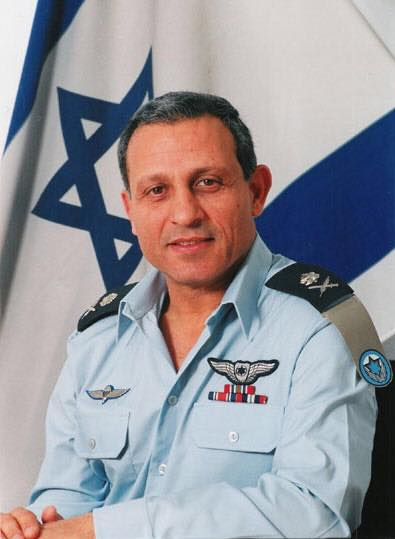
- Born: 1944 (age 81–82); Jerusalem, Mandatory Palestine
- Military career
- Allegiance: Israel
- Branch: Israeli Air Force
- Rank: Aluf
- Conflicts: Yom Kippur War; Operation Opera: 2009 Sudan airstrikes

Aluf Eitan Ben Eliyahu (Hebrew: איתן בן-אליהו; born 1944) is a retired major general in the Israel Defense Forces and was commander of the Israeli Air Force (IAF).

== Early life and military career ==
Eliyahu's father was born in Khorramshahr, Iran, and in 1922 immigrated to British-mandated Palestine; Eliyahu's mother was from North Macedonia. Eliyahu himself was born in Jerusalem in 1944. During the 1973 Yom Kippur War, Eliyahu shot down two Egyptian fighters as he led a squadron of F-4 Phantoms. June 27, 1979 over Lebanon, while flying an F-15 Eagle as part of a 4 ship formation, he shot down a Syrian MiG 21 with the M61 cannon scoring the first recorded guns kill (the 3rd air to air kill) for the F-15. In 1981 he flew as fighter escort during Operation Opera, which resulted in the destruction of Iraq's Osirak nuclear reactor. Eliyahu was commander of an F-15 squadron, member of the IAF Aerobatic Team, a base commander, head of the Operational Requirements Division, and in 1987 was appointed Head of Operations for the IAF. On July 1, 1996 Eliyahu was promoted to Commander of the IAF. Over the course of his tenure Eliyahu focused on extending the range of IAF operations, especially in regard to Iran. As such, Eliyahu ordered 25 F-15I fighters, which had a longer range than Israel's previously purchased F-15s. Eliyahu stepped down as IAF commander on April 4, 2000.

== Post-military activities ==
Since leaving active duty, Eliyahu is founder and CEO of the Sentry Technology Group, and was the president of East West Ventures Ltd. from 2000 to 2002. He is the chairman of the Koret Foundation's Israel Economic Development Fund and of Aeronautics Defense systems, and co-Chair of the Israel National Museum of Science. Eliyahu is also on the boards of Hebrew University of Jerusalem, Zionism 2000, the Israel Democracy Institute, and the Rabin Research Center.

== Education ==
Eliyahu studied at Bar Ilan University, where he received a B.A. in economics and business administration. He also earned an M.A. from Tel Aviv University in strategy and international relations and attended Harvard's six-week Advanced Management Program.
