= 102 Squadron (Israel) =

Israeli military unit

102nd Squadron
- Flying Tiger Squadron
- Active: December August 1967-present
- Country: Israel
- Branch: Israeli Air Force
- Role: Air Defence
- Garrison/HQ: Hatzerim Airbase

Insignia
- Squadron Patch

Aircraft flown
- Trainer: Alenia Aermacchi M-346 Lavi

The 102 Squadron of the Israeli Air Force, also known as the Flying Tiger Squadron, operated TA-4H Skyhawk trainers and A-4N fighters and now operates M-346 Lavi at Hatzerim Airbase in the Negev near Beersheba.

== History ==
The squadron was formed in August 1967, when Israel received new US-made A-4s to replace the aging Dassault Mystere and Super Mystere. This represented the switch to US-made weapons due to the French embargo after the 1967 crisis.

The squadron has fought in all major Israeli wars since 1968, carrying out both interdiction and close ground support missions. It has suffered severe losses, the heaviest in the Yom Kippur War in 1973, when about 20 planes were lost and 7 pilots killed.

The squadron continues to fly today, playing various roles, and uses the 2-seat M-346s in advanced IAF pilot training. The squadron is designated to continue service as operational and training units in the future.

== Current role ==
During March 2016 the unit was noted as flying Alenia Aermacchi M-346 Lavi's.

The last A-4Ns were retired in December 2015.
