= Tel Nof Airbase =

Main base of the Israeli Air Force

Tel Nof Israeli Air Force Base Air Force Base 8
- בָּסִיס חֵיל-הַאֲוִויר תֵּל נוֹף
- Rehovot, Central District in Israel
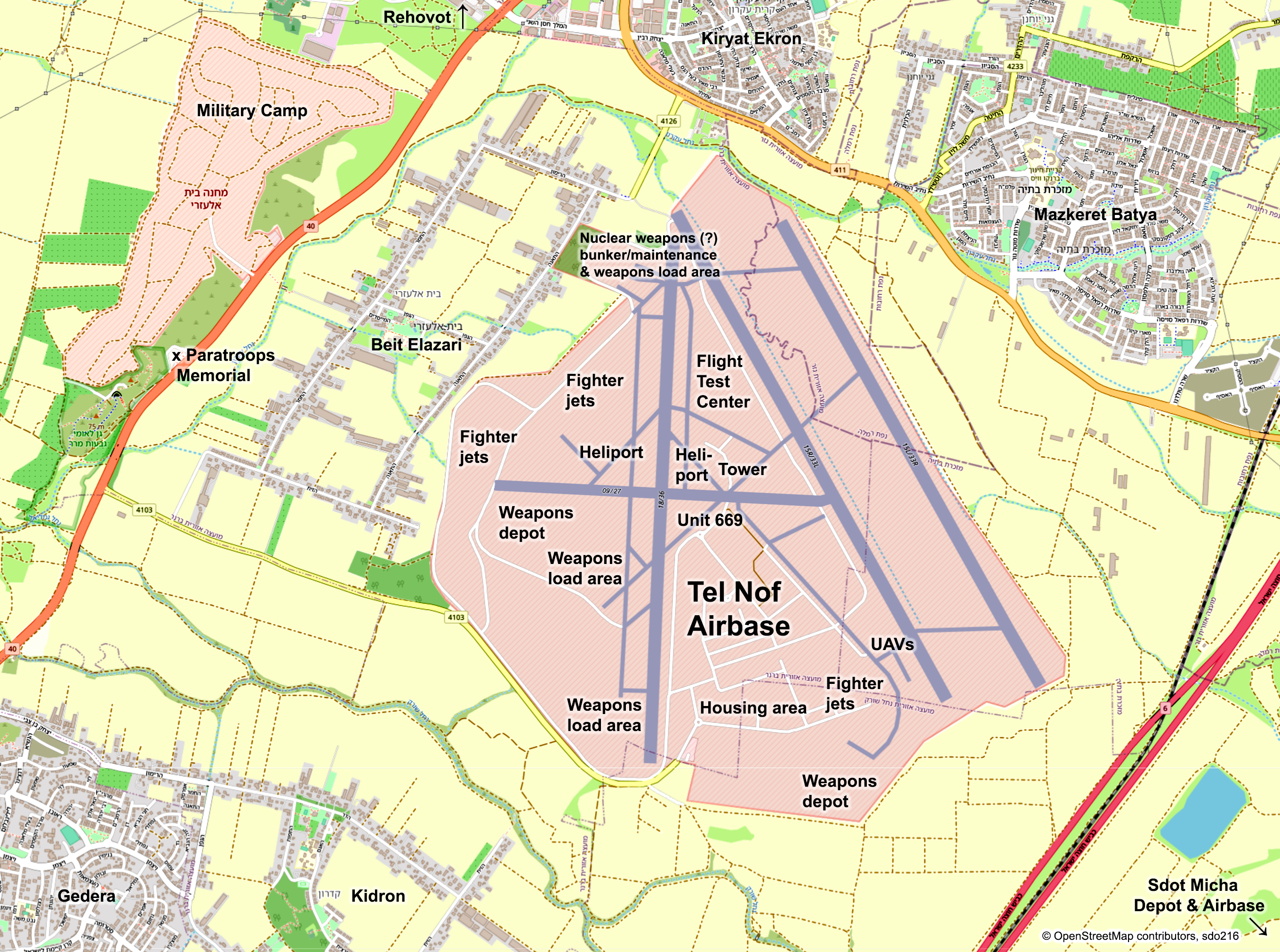

Site information
- Type: Airbase
- Owner: Israel Defense Forces
- Operator: Israeli Air Force

Location
- Shown within Israel Tel Nof Airbase (Israel)
- Coordinates: 31°50′22.10″N 34°49′18.64″E

Site history
- Built: 1941 RAF / 1948 IAF
- In use: 1941 - present

Airfield information
- Identifiers: ICAO: LLEK
- Elevation: 59 metres (194 ft) AMSL
Runways
Direction	Length and surface
15R/33L	2,388 metres (7,835 ft) Asphalt
15L/33R	2,387 metres (7,831 ft) Asphalt
18/36	2,750 metres (9,022 ft) Asphalt
09/27	1,830 metres (6,004 ft) Asphalt

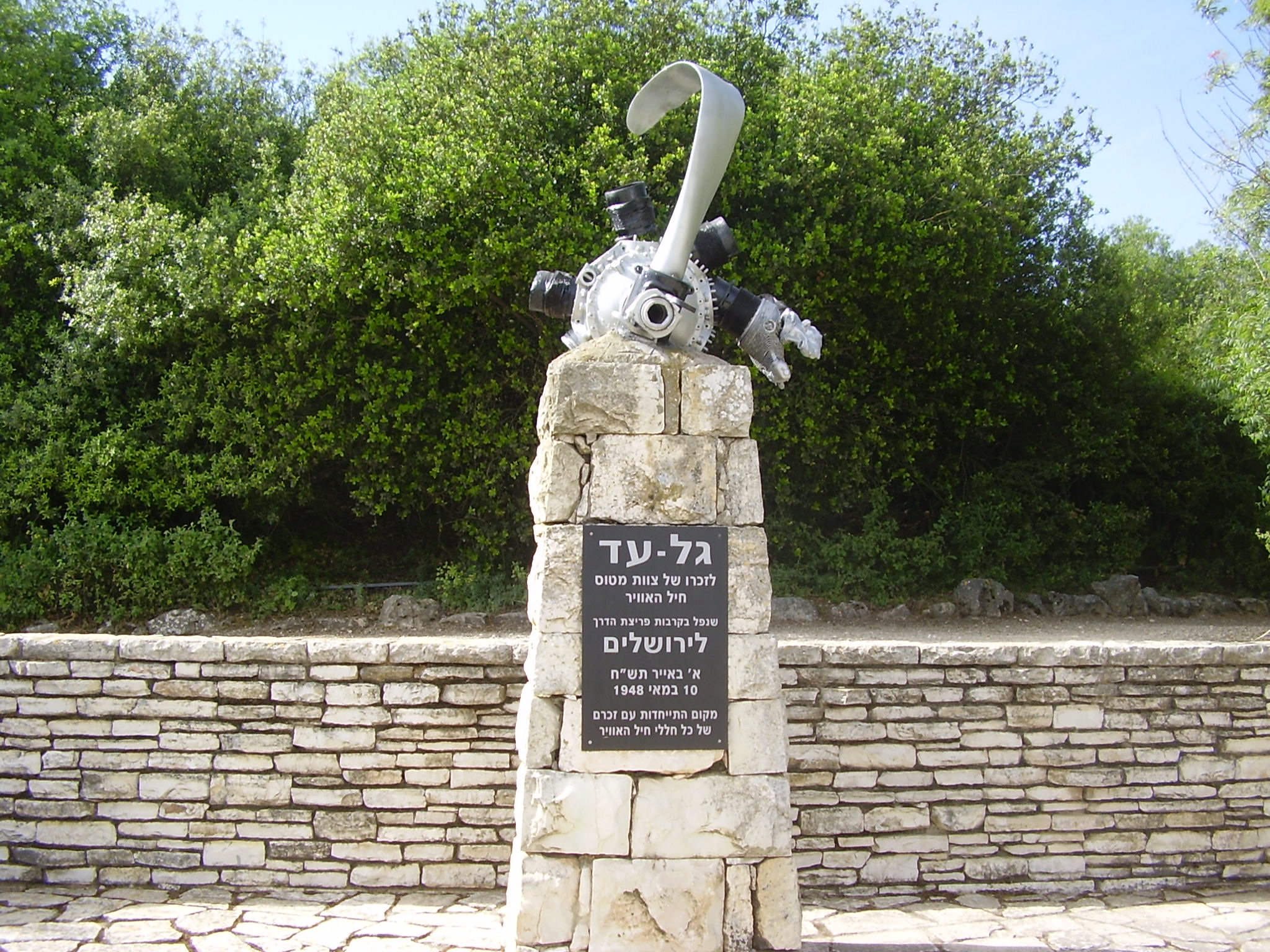
Israeli Air Force Memorial on "Pilots' Mountain", IAF's main memorial for its fallen pilots and airmen, created in the 1950s, 25 km east of Tel Nof

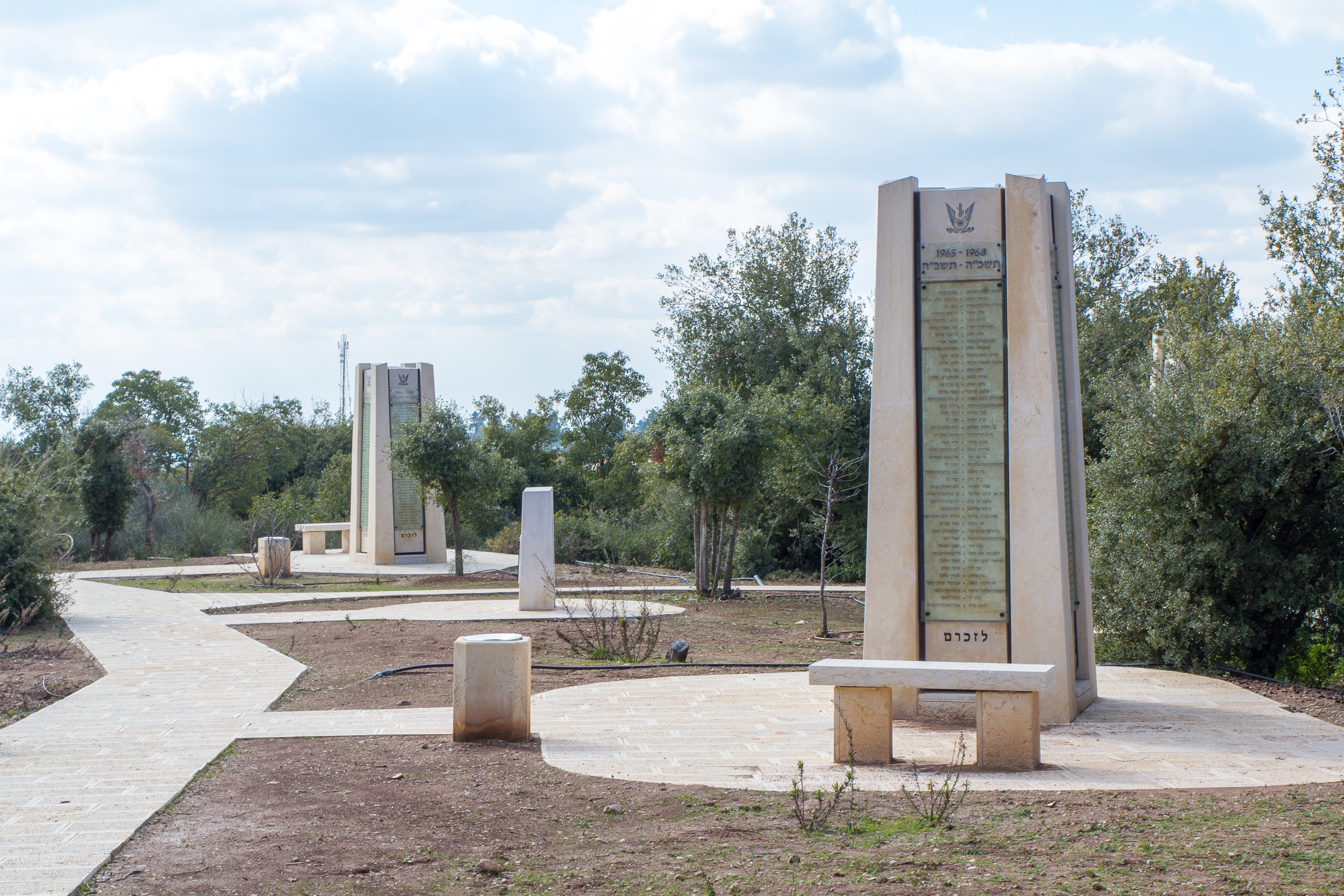
Memorial steles bearing the names of fallen pilots on "Pilots' Mountain" (31°46′28″N 35°05′24″E)

Tel Nof Airbase (Hebrew: בָּסִיס חֵיל-הַאֲוִויר תֵּל נוֹף, English: Lookout hill) (ICAO: LLEK), also known as Air Force Base 8, is the oldest and main base of the Israeli Air Force (IAF) located 5 km south of Rehovot, in the center of Israel. Tel Nof houses two strike fighter, two transport helicopter and a UAV squadron. Also located on the base are the Flight Test Center Manat and several special units of the Israel Defense Forces (IDF), among others Unit 669 (heliborne Combat Search and Rescue, CSAR) and the Paratroopers Brigade training center and its headquarters. See also: Units.

== History (RAF) ==
=== British Mandate ===
Established in the spring of 1941 as RAF Aqir during the British Mandate for Palestine, it served as the main base for the Royal Air Force (RAF) in Palestine. It was named after the Arab village Aqir north of it that perished in the 1948 Arab–Israeli War and was located in the area of today's Kiryat Ekron.

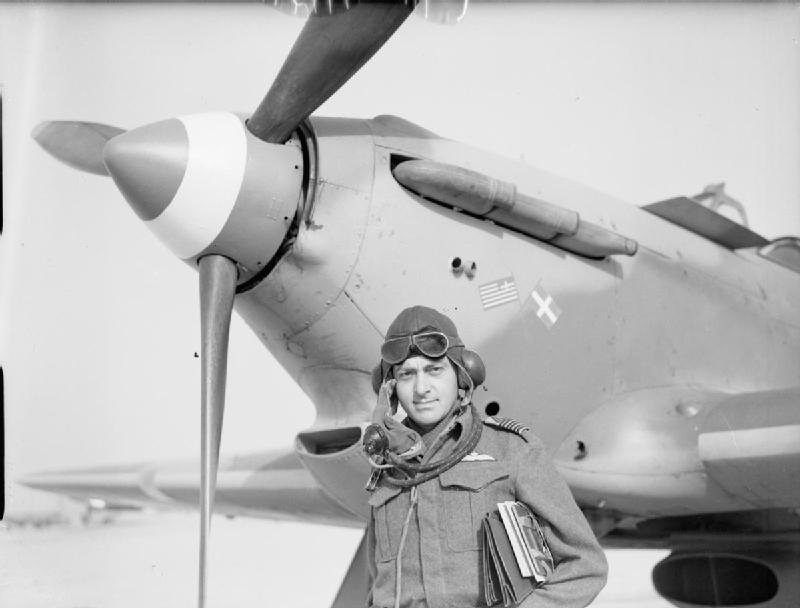
A Greek pilot in front of a British Hawker Hurricane at RAF Aqir, 1941-1943

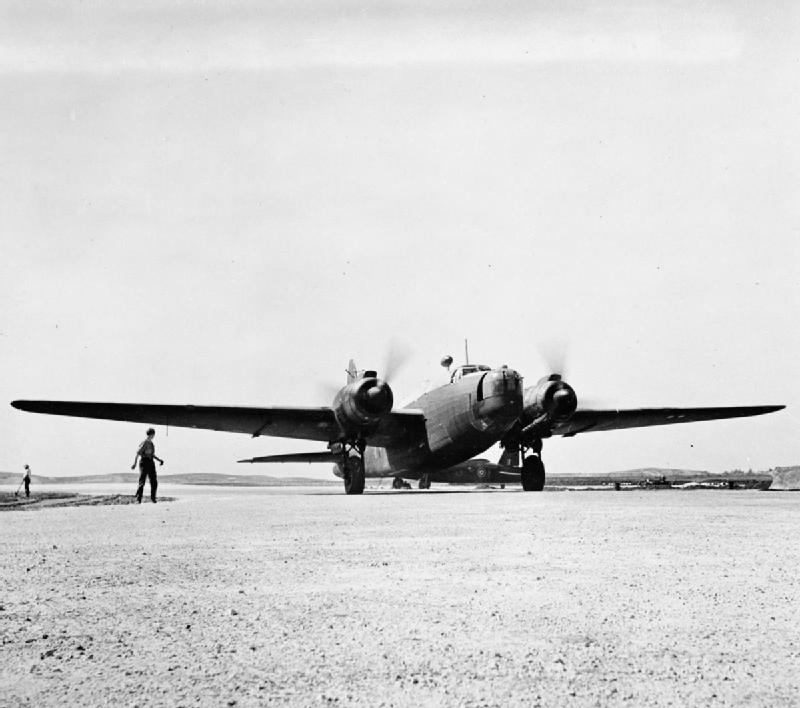
A Vickers Wellington Mark X of 76 OTU at RAF Aqir, 1944-1945

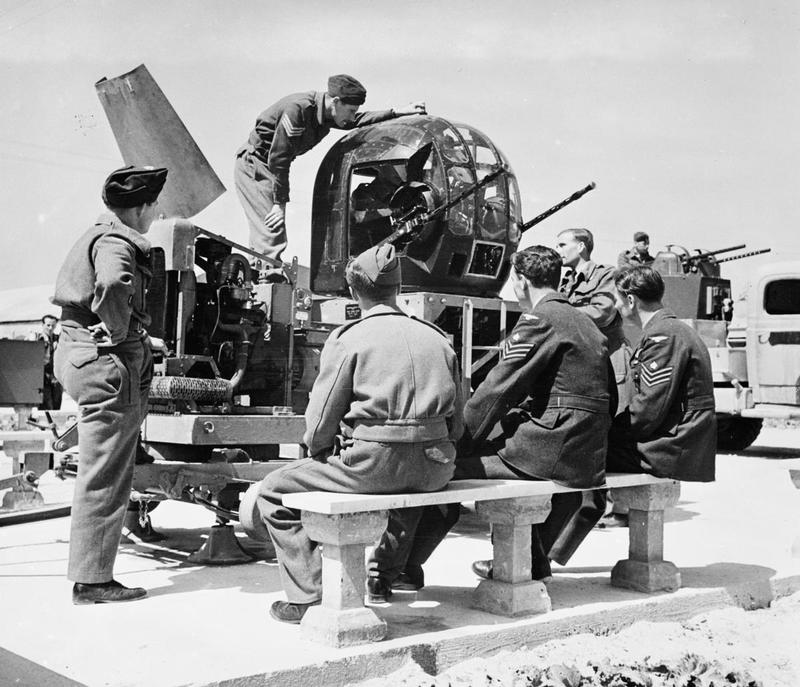
Air gunner training at RAF Aqir, 1944-1945

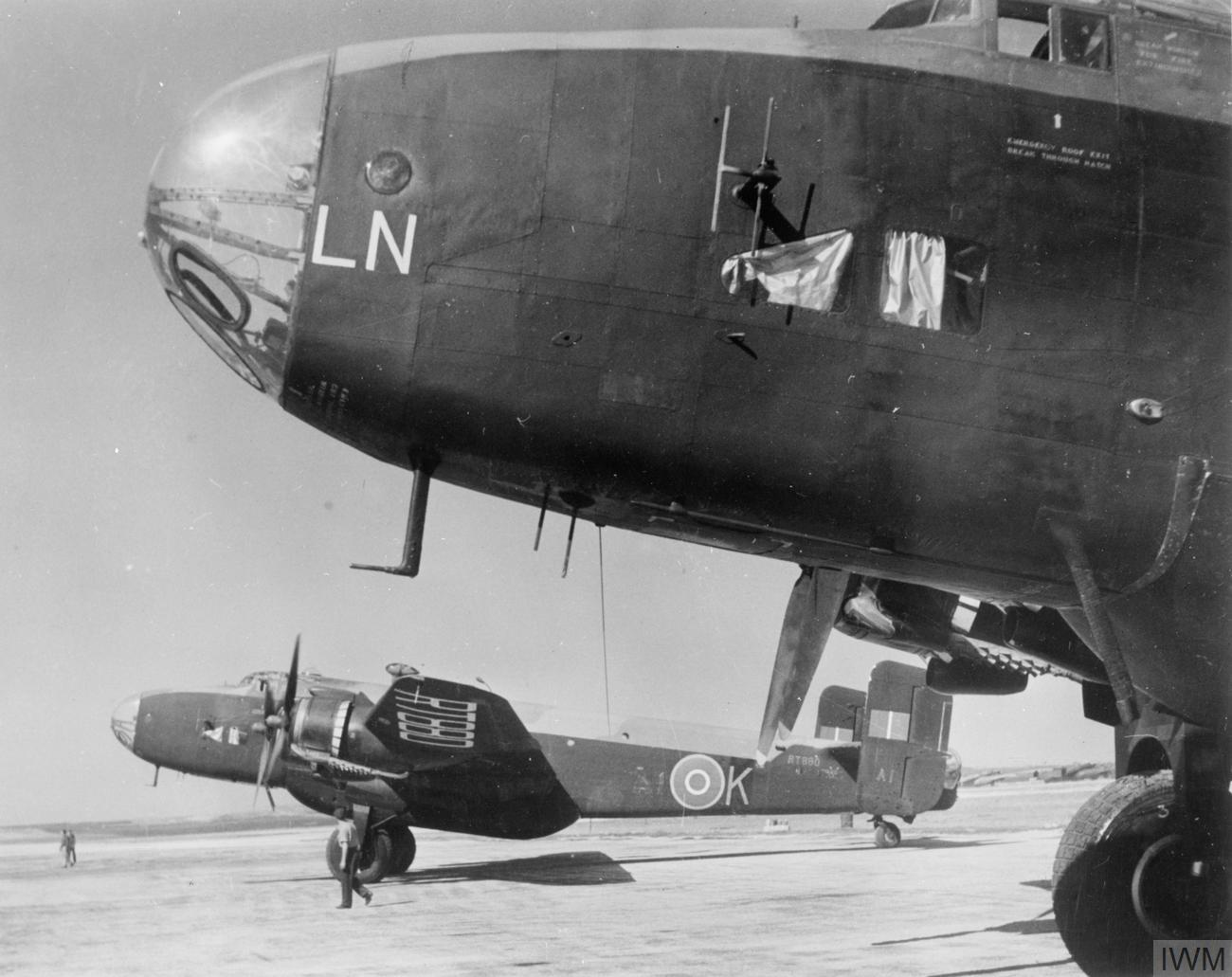
Handley Page Halifax bombers used for transport after WWII, of 113 Squadron from RAF Aqir, 1946-1947

=== Operational units from 1941 to 1948 ===
- No. 6 Squadron between 17 and 24 February 1941 with the Westland Lysander
- No. 10 Squadron detachment (1942) Handley Page Halifax
- No. 11 Squadron (1941) Bristol Blenheim IV
- No. 32 Squadron (1946) Supermarine Spitfire IX
- No. 37 Squadron (1945) Consolidated Liberator VI
- No. 45 Squadron (1941) Bristol Blenheim IV
- No. 55 Squadron (1941) Bristol Blenheim IV
- No. 70 Squadron (1945) Consolidated Liberator VI
- No. 80 Squadron (1941) Hawker Hurricane I
- No. 84 Squadron (1941) Bristol Blenheim IV
- No. 113 Squadron (1946–1947) Handley Page Halifax
- No. 159 Squadron (1942) Consolidated Liberator II
- No. 160 Squadron (1942) Consolidated Liberator II
- No. 162 Squadron (1942) Vickers Wellington later Bristol Blenheim IV
- No. 208 Squadron (1941) Hawker Audax and (1946) Supermarine Spitfire VIII
- No. 211 Squadron (1941) Bristol Blenheim IV
- No. 215 Squadron (1947) Douglas Dakota I
- No. 221 Squadron detachment (1945) Vickers Wellington XII
- No. 227 Squadron (1942) Handley Page Halifax
- No. 250 Squadron (1941) Curtiss Tomahawk IIB
- No. 294 Squadron detachment (1944) Vickers Wellington IC
- No. 335 (Greek) Squadron (1941) Hawker Hurricane I
- No. 450 Squadron RAAF (1941) Hawker Hurricane I
- No. 620 Squadron (1946) Douglas Dakota and Handley Page Halifax
- No. 621 Squadron (1946) Avro Lancaster ASR.III
- No. 680 Squadron detachment (1945) Fairchild Argus
- No. 76 Operational Training Unit Vickers Wellington - Formed at RAF Aqir on 1 October 1943, equipped with Vickers Wellington Mk.IIIs and Xs to train night bomber crews for squadrons in the Middle East, disbanded on 30 July 1945. 76 OTU, despite operating Wellingtons, were also working up crews for B-24 Liberators. After completion of their course those crews were passed on to Liberator conversion units.

== History (IAF) ==
=== Names of the base ===
After the British withdrawal from RAF Aqir in May 1948, the base was taken over by the newly founded Israel Defense Forces (IDF) and renamed Ekron Airbase – after the biblical city of Ekron and today's Kiryat Ekron 1 km north of it – and, from 1950, Tel Nof Airbase (English: Lookout hill). The name "Tel Nof" dates back to the 1930s, when the area was known by this name as an urban development area, similar to the then-thriving "Tel Aviv" (English: Spring hill).

=== First Israeli fighter aircraft ===
During the Arab–Israeli War on 29 May 1948, the first four fighter aircraft Avia S-199 of the first squadron 101 "First Fighter" of the new Israeli Air Force (IAF) took off from here for their first mission, an attack on the Ad Halom Bridge in the eastern outskirts of Ashdod, which was in the hands of Egyptian troops, who advanced on Tel Aviv. Important was less the modest military success of the operation itself – one plane was shot down – than the shock to the Egyptian soldiers when they saw with their own eyes that Israel now had an Air Force – with the Star of David on its wings and fuselage (see photo of plaque in gallery below). The advance was delayed, and this gave the Israeli army (IDF) enough time to bring in troops and stop it.

On 17 August 1948, Ekron Airbase (later Tel Nof Airbase) was officially and ceremoniously opened. Hatzor Airbase and Ramat David Airbase taken over from the British soon followed. After the Avia S-199 – imported from Czechoslovakia and a replica of the Messerschmitt Bf 109 made out of parts left over from German war production – additional fighter aircraft were acquired from the stocks of the former Allies, such as the British Supermarine Spitfire and the North American P-51 Mustang. The IAF Flight Academy, which was initially based at Camp Sirkin east of Petah Tikva, was established at Tel Nof in 1955 until it was relocated to the then newly built Hatzerim Airbase in 1966, where it still is today.

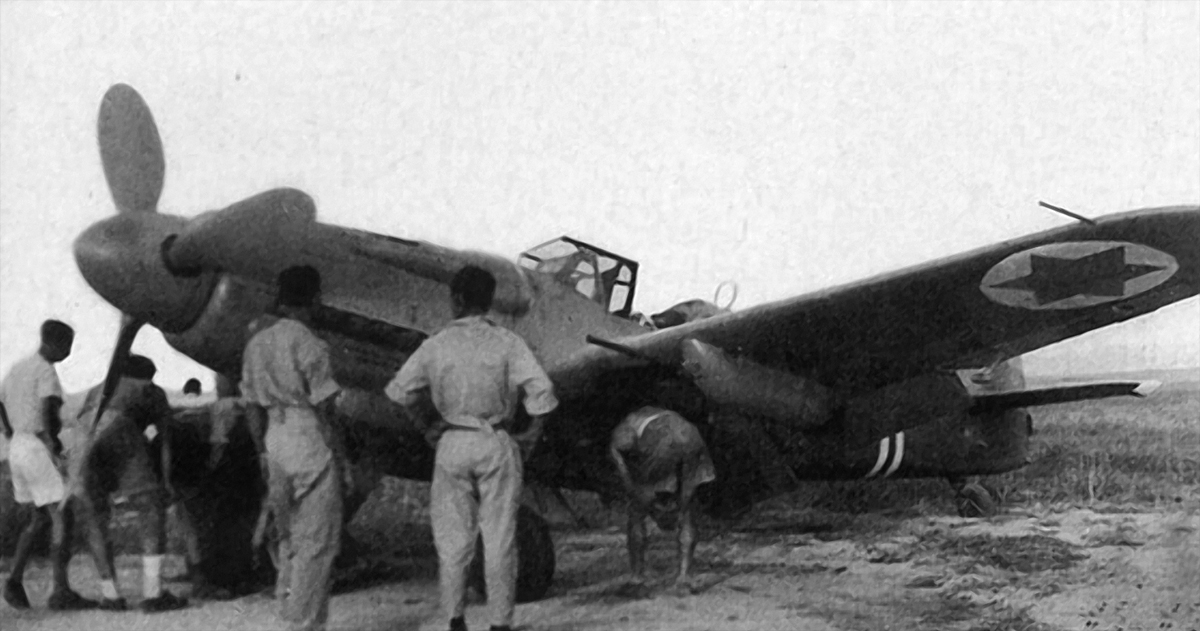
Czech Avia S-199 of Israeli 101 Squadron at Ekron Airbase in 1948

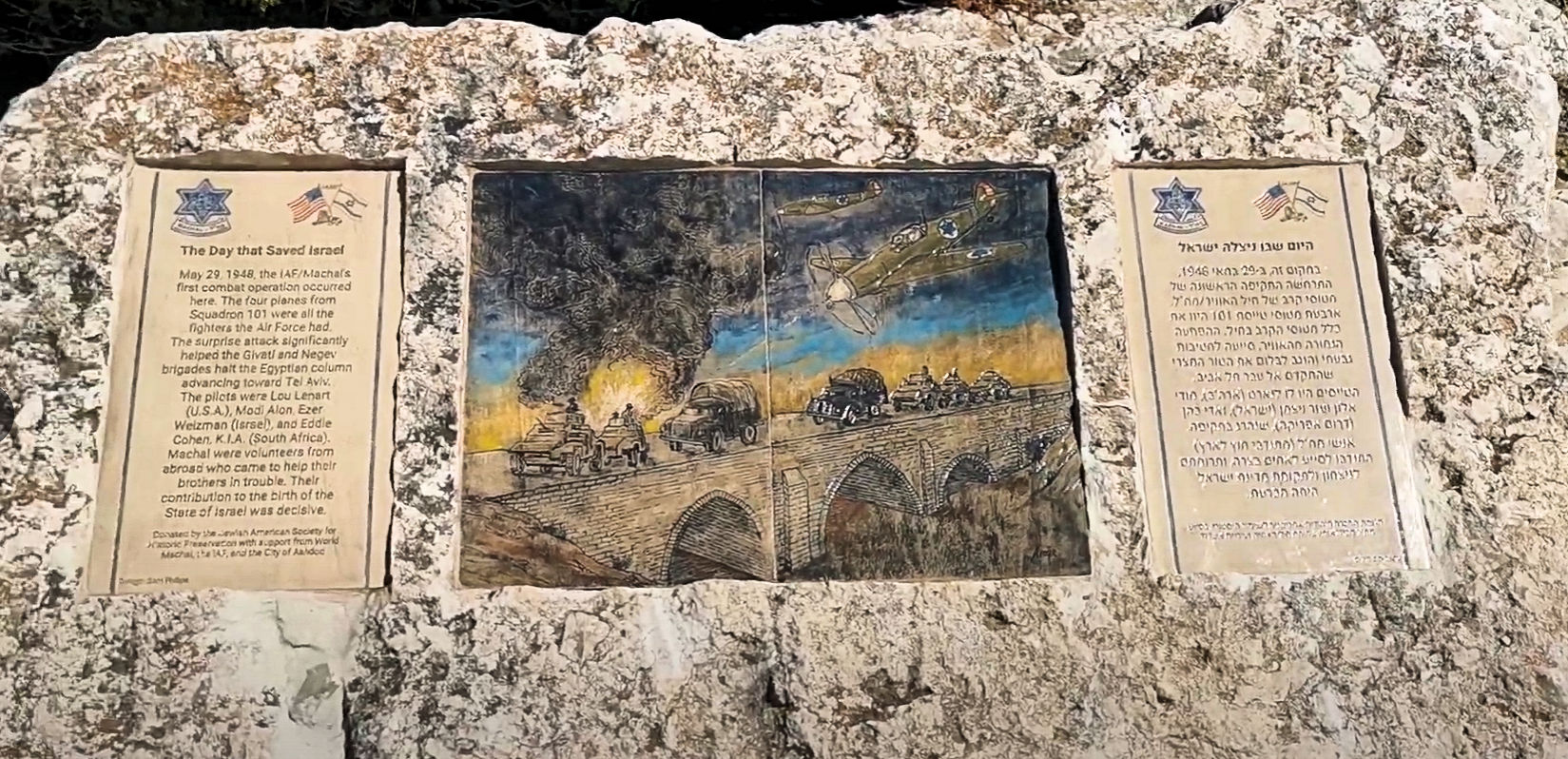
Plaque on the "Battle of Ad Halom" at the Ad Halom park east of Ashdod

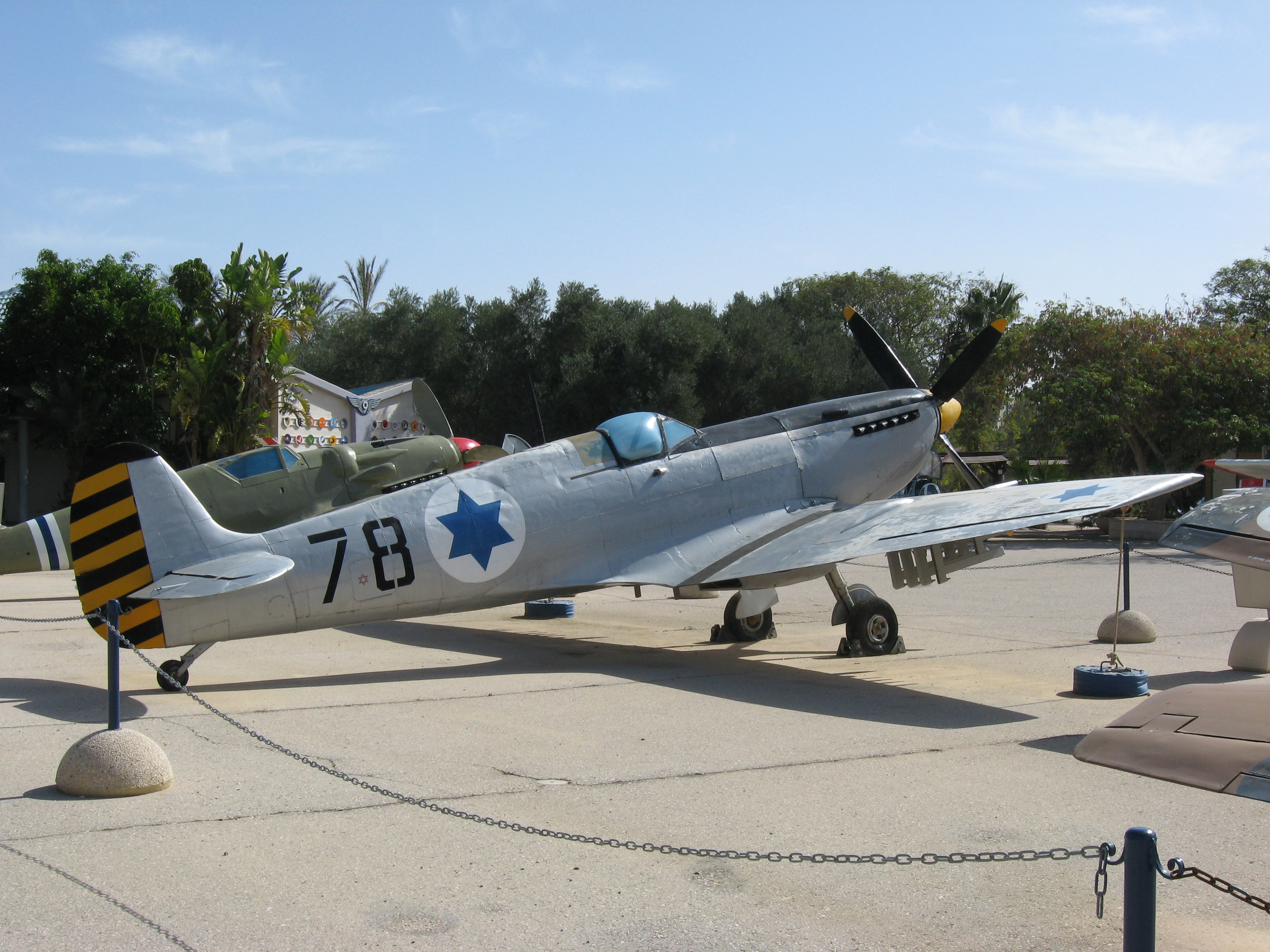
A Spitfire Mk.IXe of 101 Squadron, from the early days of the IAF

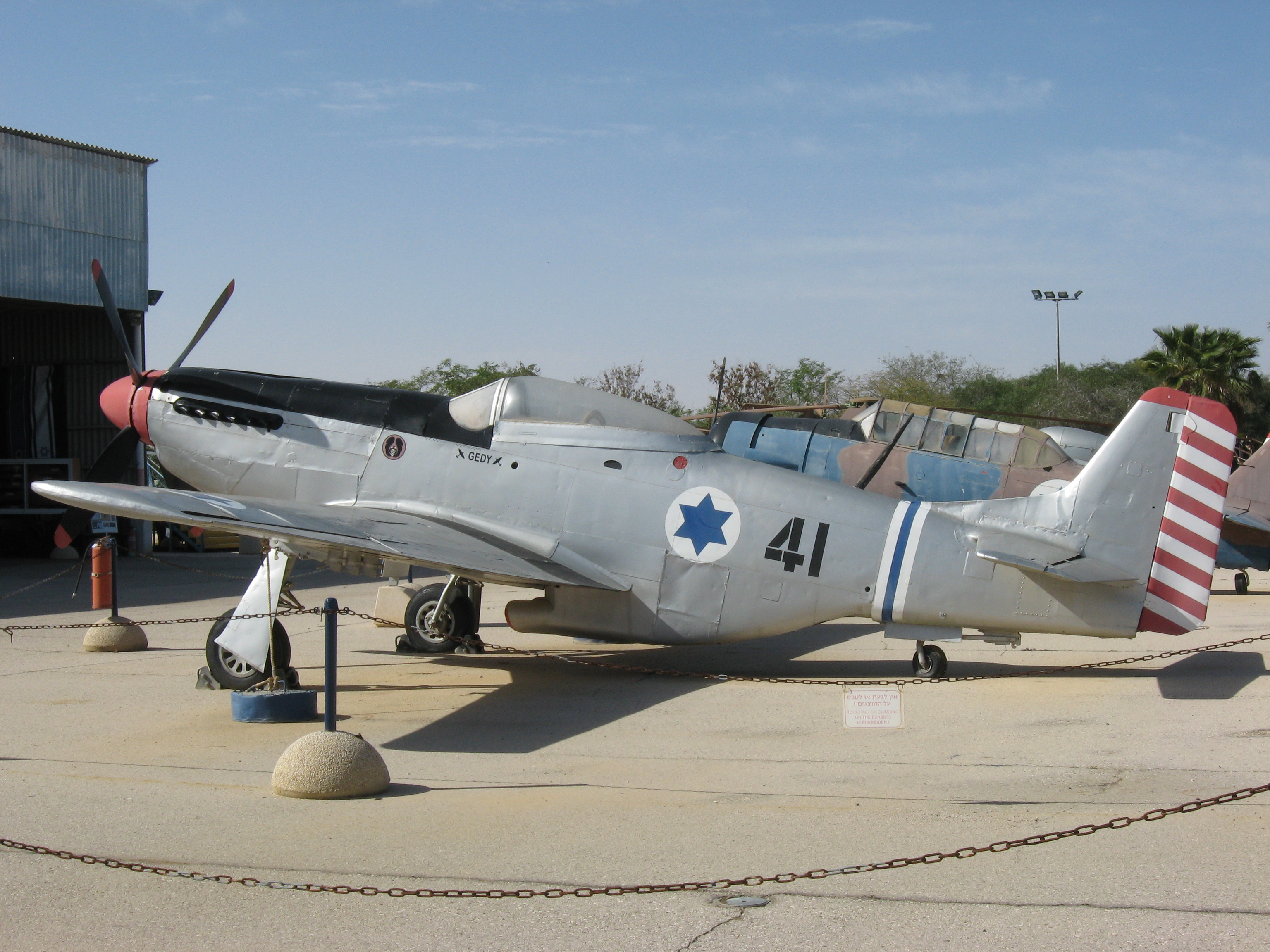
A P-51D Mustang of 101 Squadron of the IAF, from its early days too

=== First jets at Tel Nof in 119 Squadron "Bat" ===
The 119 Squadron "Bat" was established in 1956, initially at Ramat David Airbase and was intended to fly night missions with jets (hence the name "Bat"). It received used Gloster Meteor NF.13 (two-seat night fighters) from the Royal Air Force, with which it shortly thereafter took part in the combat operations of the Suez Crisis. To bring the squadron closer to its primary operational area in Egypt, it was relocated to Tel Nof at the end of 1957 and the following year received several new SO-4050 Vautours from the French manufacturer Sud-Ouest. In 1963, the 119 Squadron "Bat" was temporarily decommissioned and its jets transferred to squadrons at Ramat David.

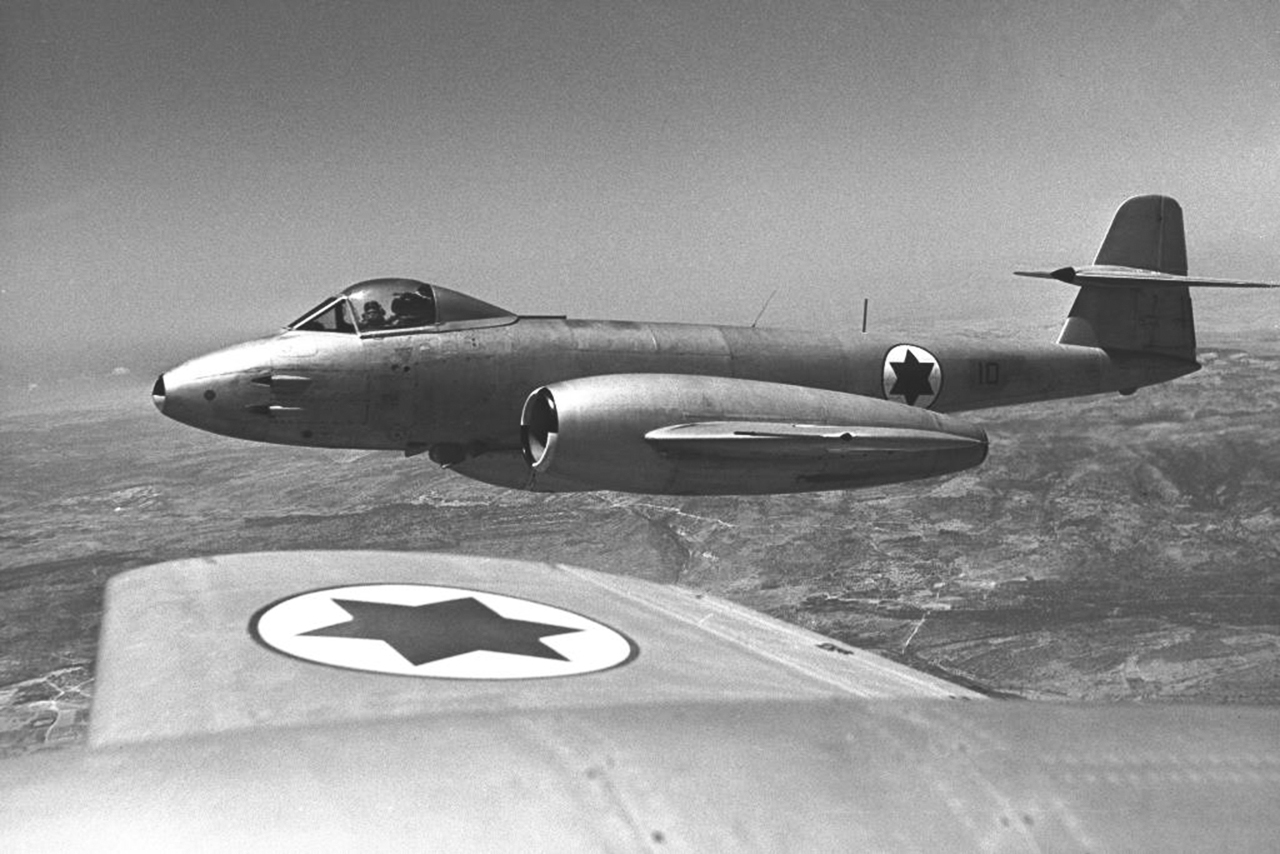
Single-seat Gloster Meteor F.8 in flight, from Ramat David in 1954

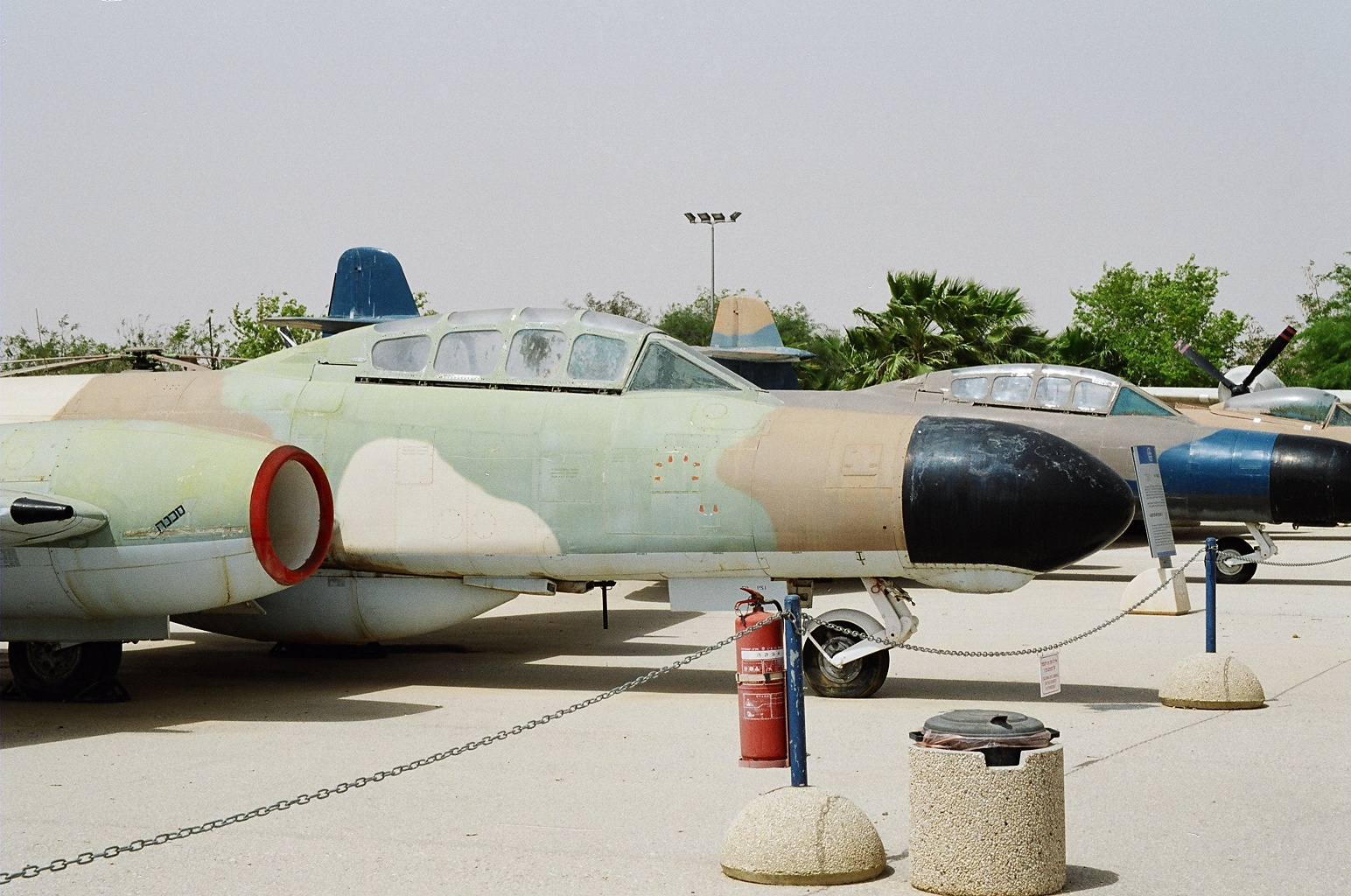
Two-seat Gloster Meteor NF.13 at the IAF Museum near Hatzerim in 2004

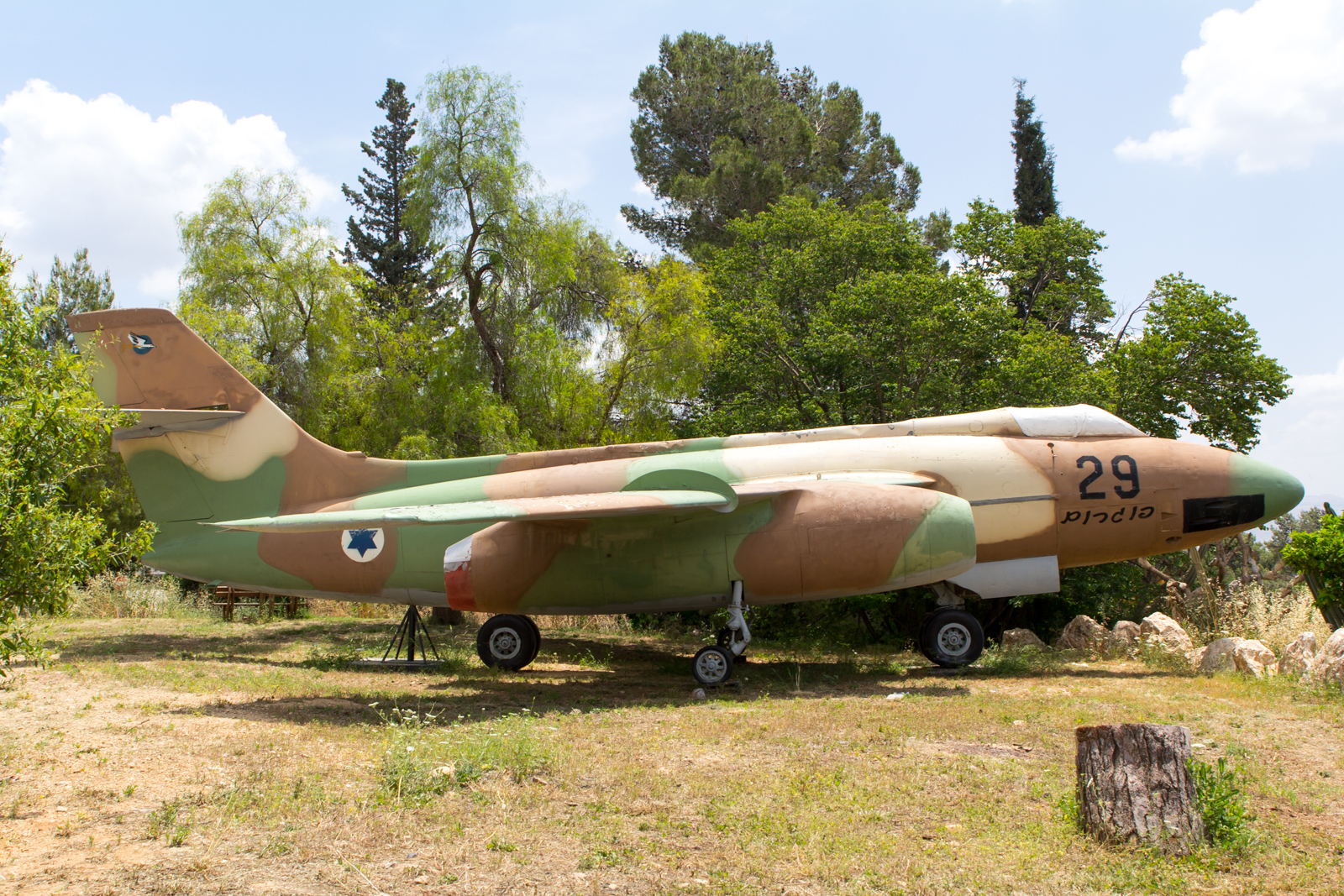
A preserved SO-4050 Vautour IIA near Kfar Giladi in 2015

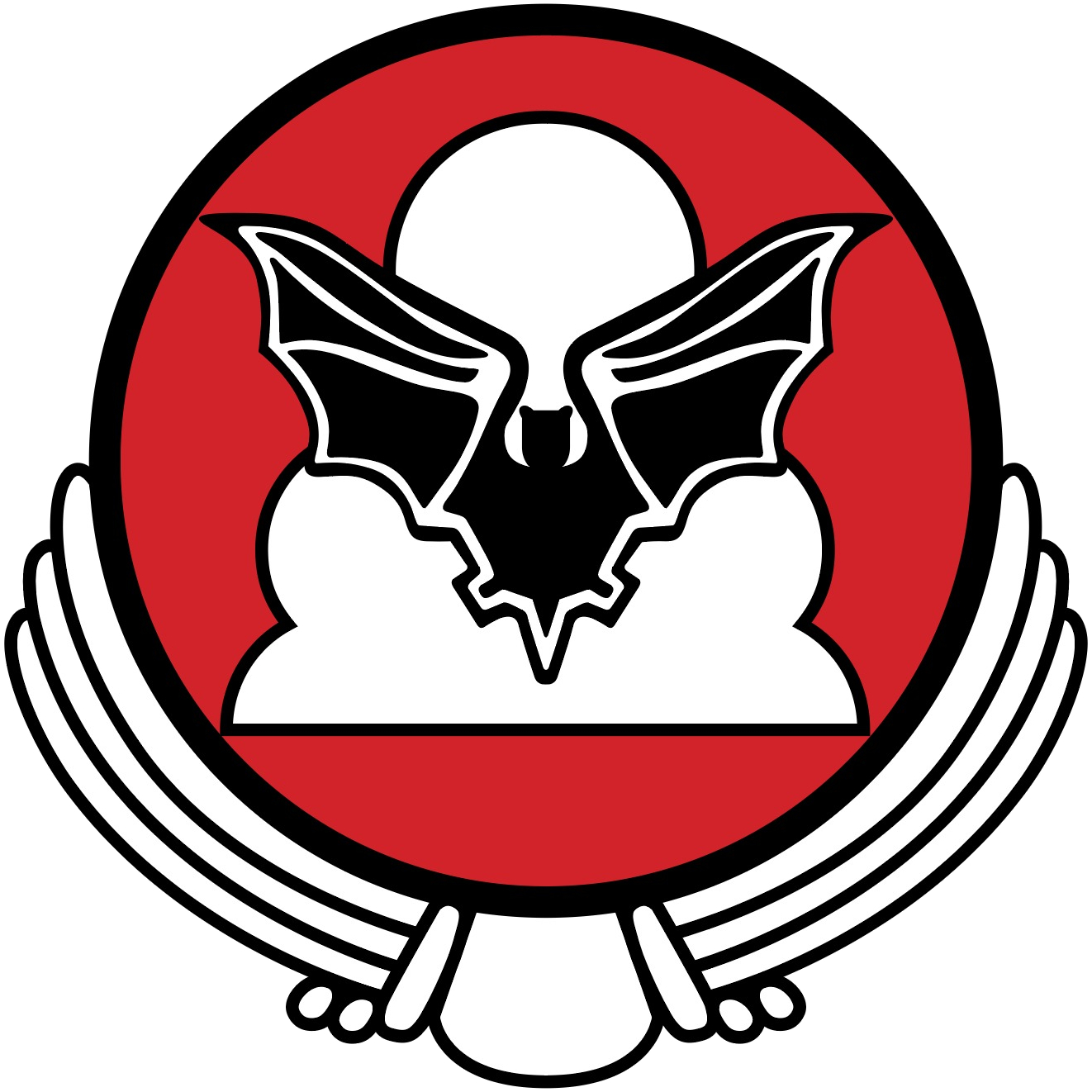
Current symbol of 119 Squadron "Bat", today based on Ramon

In 1964, the 119 Squadron was reopened at Tel Nof with new French Dassault Mirage IIICJ Shahak fighter jets, which later flew over 300 missions in the Six-Day War, shooting down 23 enemy aircraft. In 1970, the Mirage jets were transferred to other squadrons and US-made F-4E Phantom II Kurnass strike fighter jets were acquired, which soon took part in the Yom Kippur War.

=== First cargo aircraft ===
At the beginning of the Palestine War in late 1947, ten Curtiss C-46 Commando cargo aircraft were purchased from the US Air Force inventory and eventually stationed at Ekron Airbase. They formed the backbone of the transport fleet of the newly founded Israeli Air Force and were consolidated in December 1948 with the formation of the 106 Squadron "Spearhead". During the war, these aircraft transported equipment and supplies to the troops and settlers in the Negev Desert in southern Israel and also carried out occasional bombing raids. Important landing sites for supply flights were the Ruhama Airfield 12 km southeast of Sderot (31°27′43″N 34°43′11″E) and the Malhata Airfield 20 km east of Beersheba, today's Nevatim Airbase.

In March 1949, shortly before the end of the war, the cargo aircraft also took part in Operation Uvda, the securing of the southern Negev up to the Red Sea, as envisaged by the UN partition plan of 1947. For this purpose, the temporary Abraham Airfield (Sde Avraham) was built far to the south, near today's Ovda Airbase. After the Palestine War, the aircraft were then used by El Al Israel Airlines (see photo in gallery below) or transferred to the 103 Squadron "Elephants". The 106 Squadron "Spearhead" was then shut down and reopened in June 1982 with F-15C/D jets on Tel Nof again.

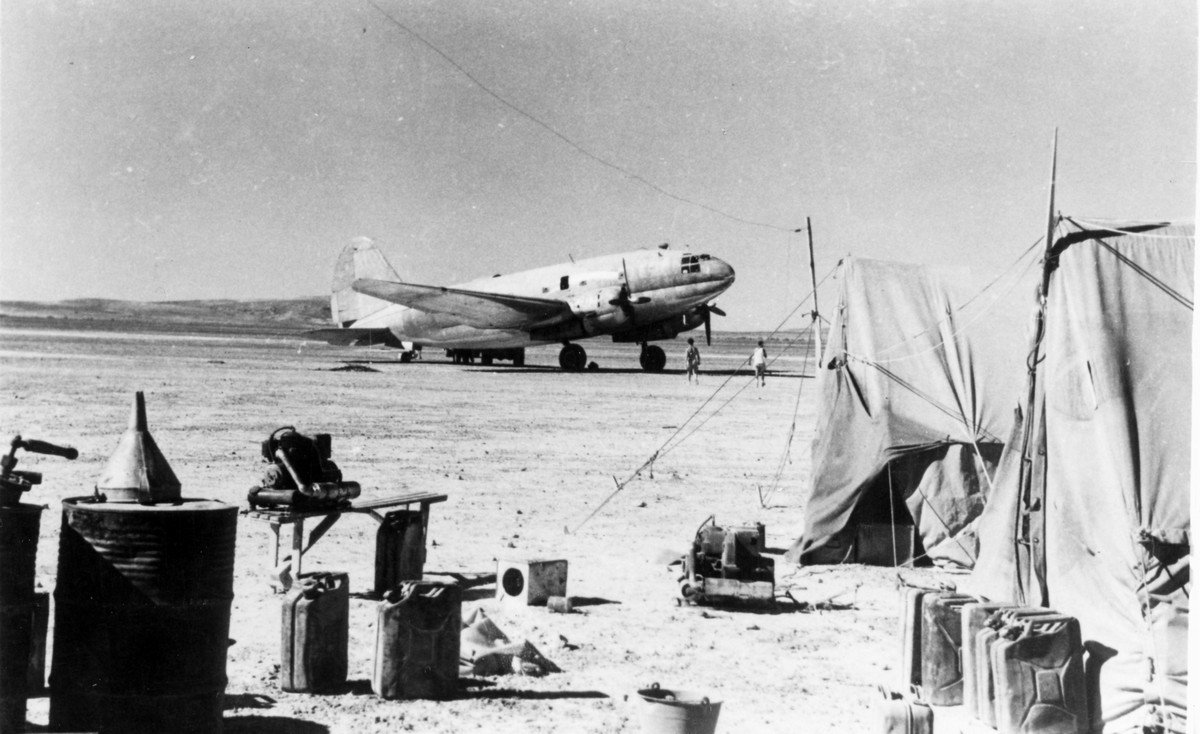
An Israeli C-46 Commando cargo plane at Ruhama Airfield in August 1948 during the Palestine War

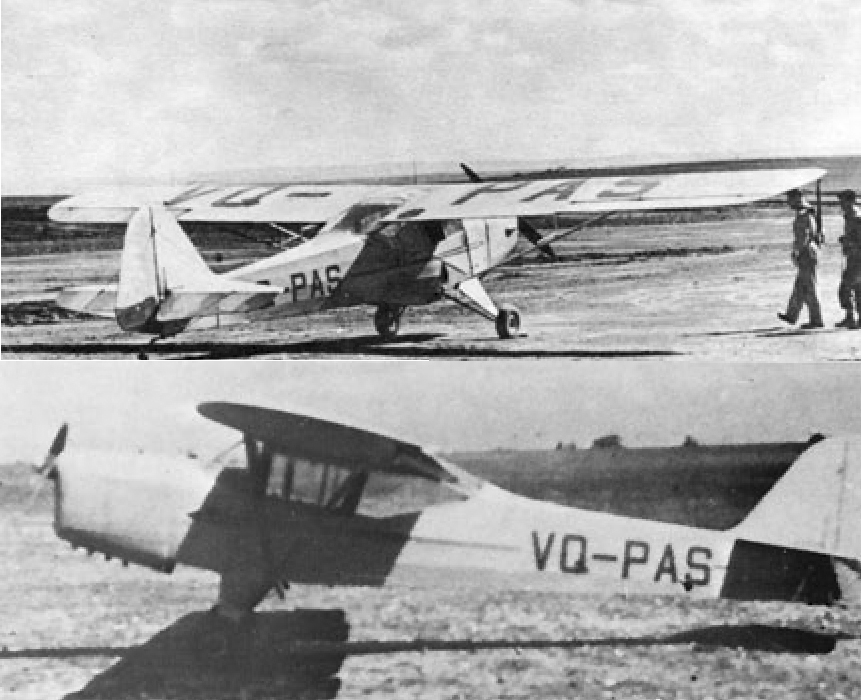
Several Auster J/1 Autocrat were also used by the Sherut Avir or IAF for the transport of personnel and material

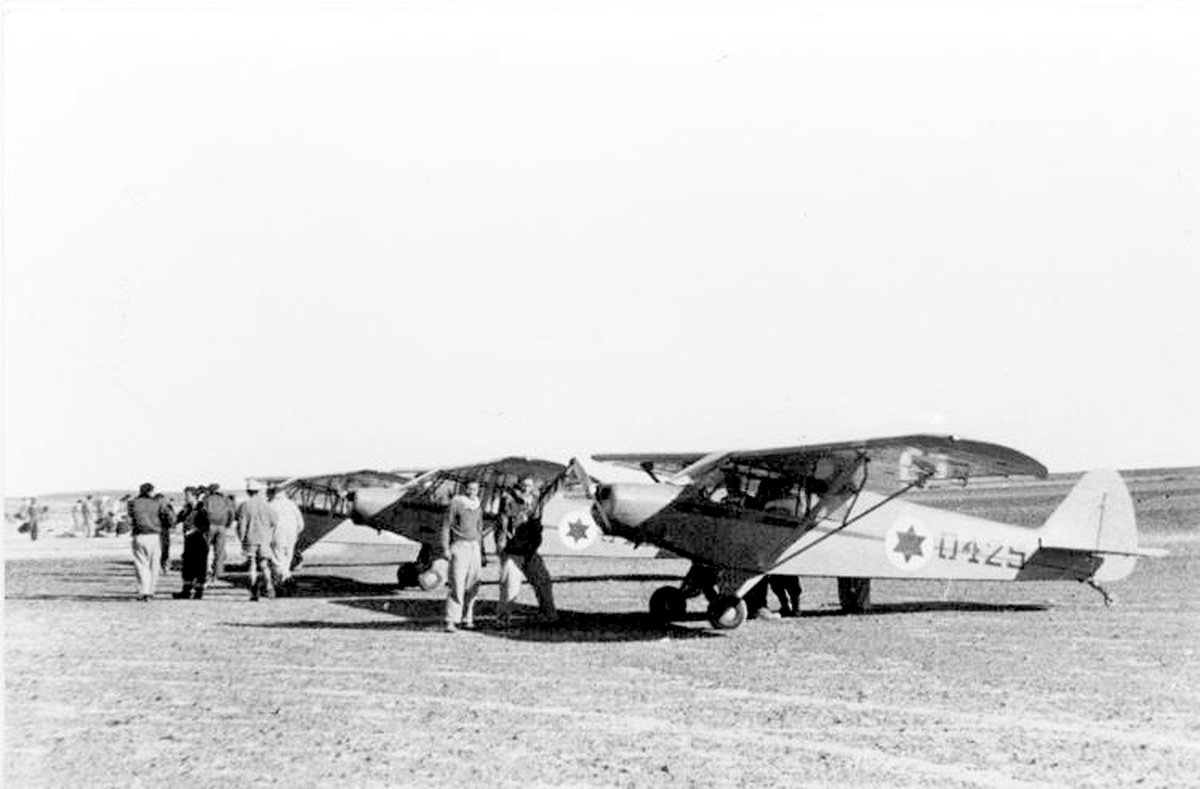
Piper PA-11 Cub Special planes on temporary Abraham Airfield (Sde Avraham) during Operation Uvda

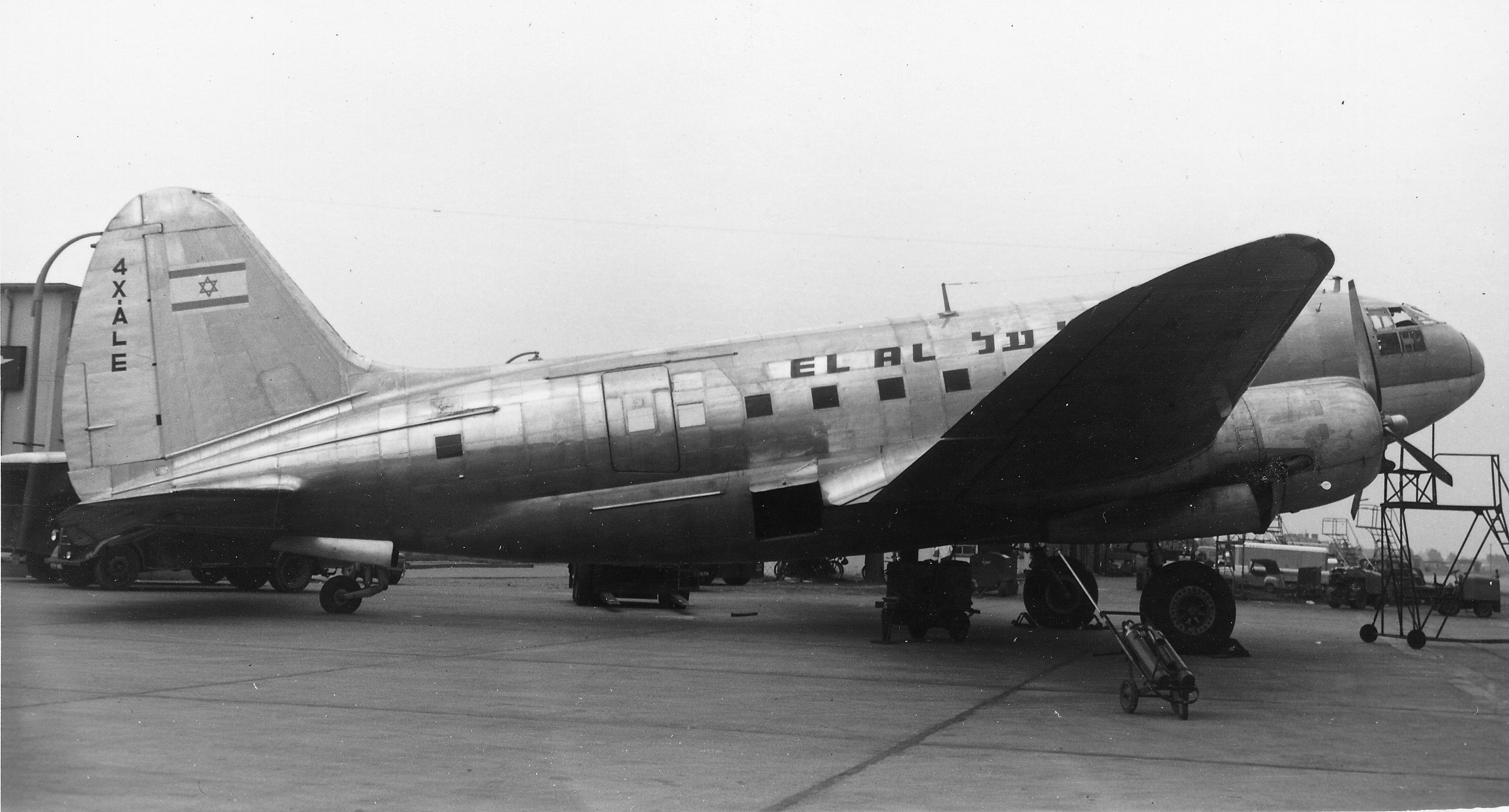
After the Palestine War several C-46 planes were transferred to El Al Israel Airlines, photo around 1950

With the 114 Squadron "Night Carriers", founded in 1966, and the 118 Squadron "Night Raptors", established in 1970 – both at Tel Nof – supplies and troop and casualty transports were now also carried out by heavy transport helicopters. The 114 Squadron initially flew the French Super Frelon Tzirʿa and later, together with the 118 Squadron, the US CH-53D Sea Stallion Yas'ur. See also: Yom Kippur War.

From around 2028, the currently inactive 114 Squadron "Night Carriers" at Tel Nof will be equipped with new US-made CH-53K King Stallion Wild transport helicopters. The 118 Squadron "Night Raptors" will continue to operate the older CH-53D Sea Stallion Yas'ur. See also: Units.

Current symbol of 114 Squadron "Night Carriers", which will operate CH-53K King Stallion in the future

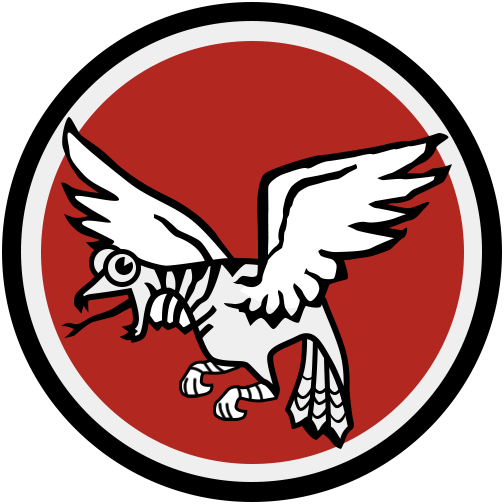
Current symbol of 118 Squadron "Night Raptors", operating CH-53D Sea Stallion since 1970

=== Paratroopers Brigade ===
During the 1948 Palestine War there was a provisional paratroopers unit in Israel, which was expanded from the beginning of the 1950s into a regular Paratroopers Brigade, whose headquarters and training center are still located at Tel Nof to this day. Since then, this brigade has participated in many important operations in the wars over Israel, such as the Suez Crisis in the fall of 1956, when Israeli paratroopers occupied the strategically important Mitla Pass on the Sinai Peninsula. During the Six-Day War, they conquested the Old City of Jerusalem and were particularly remembered for capturing the Temple Mount with the Western Wall on 7 June 1967, in an iconic photo by David Rubinger (see gallery below).

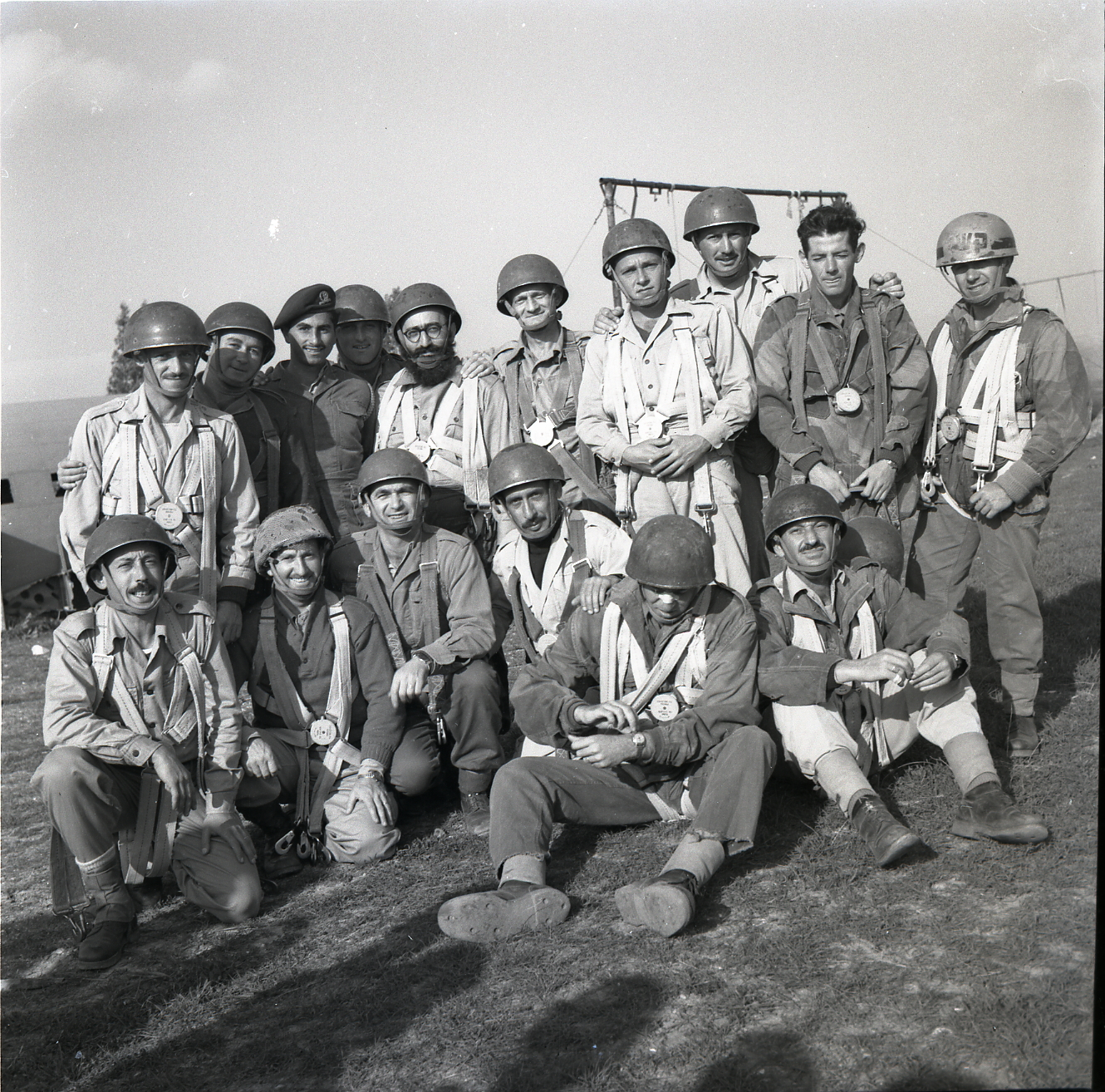
Soldiers of the Israel Paratroopers Brigade at Tel Nof Airbase in 1955

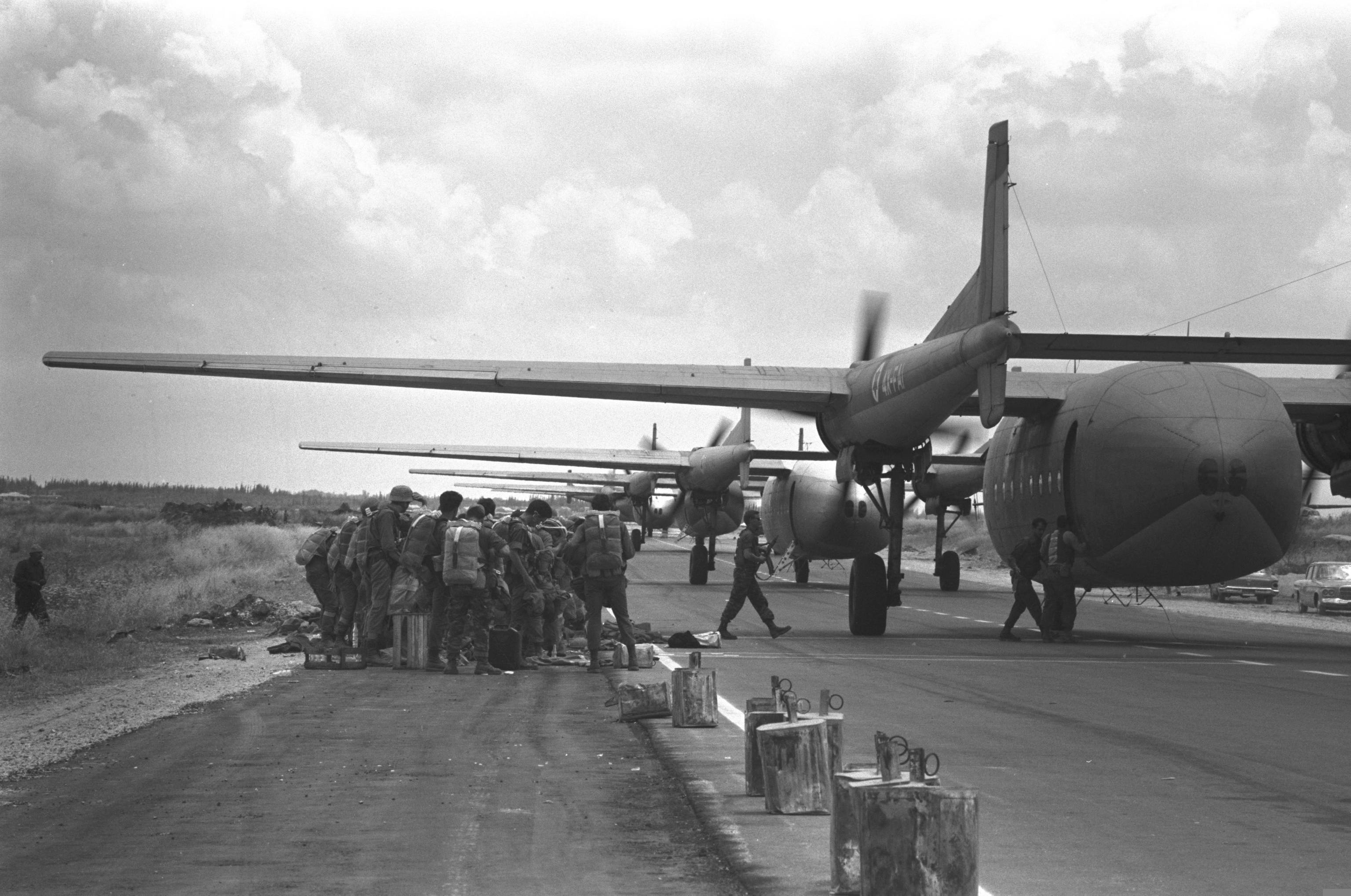
Paratroopers climb aboard en route to Jerusalem on 7 June 1967 at Tel Nof

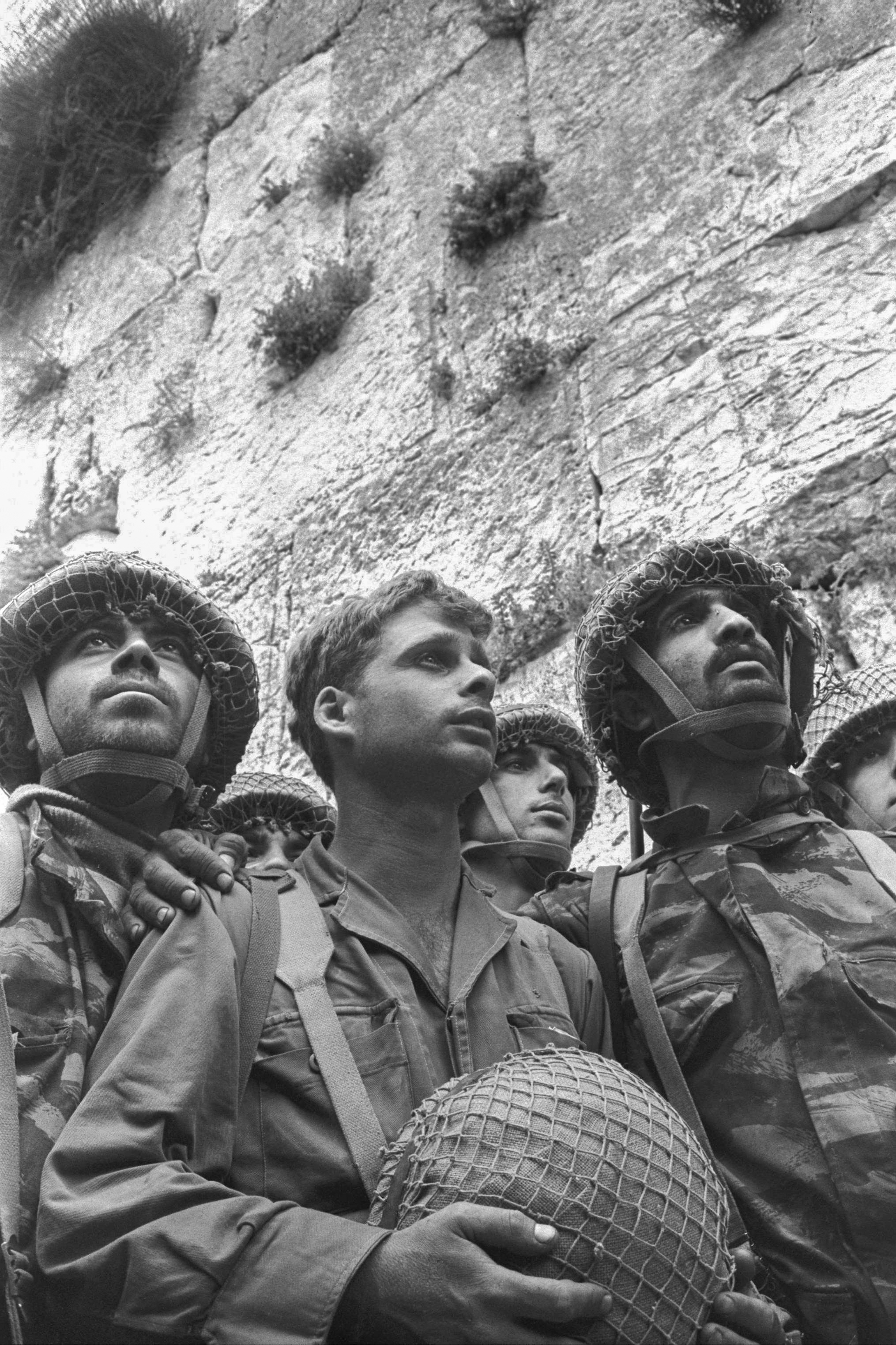
Israeli paratroopers reverently reach the Western Wall on 7 June 1967

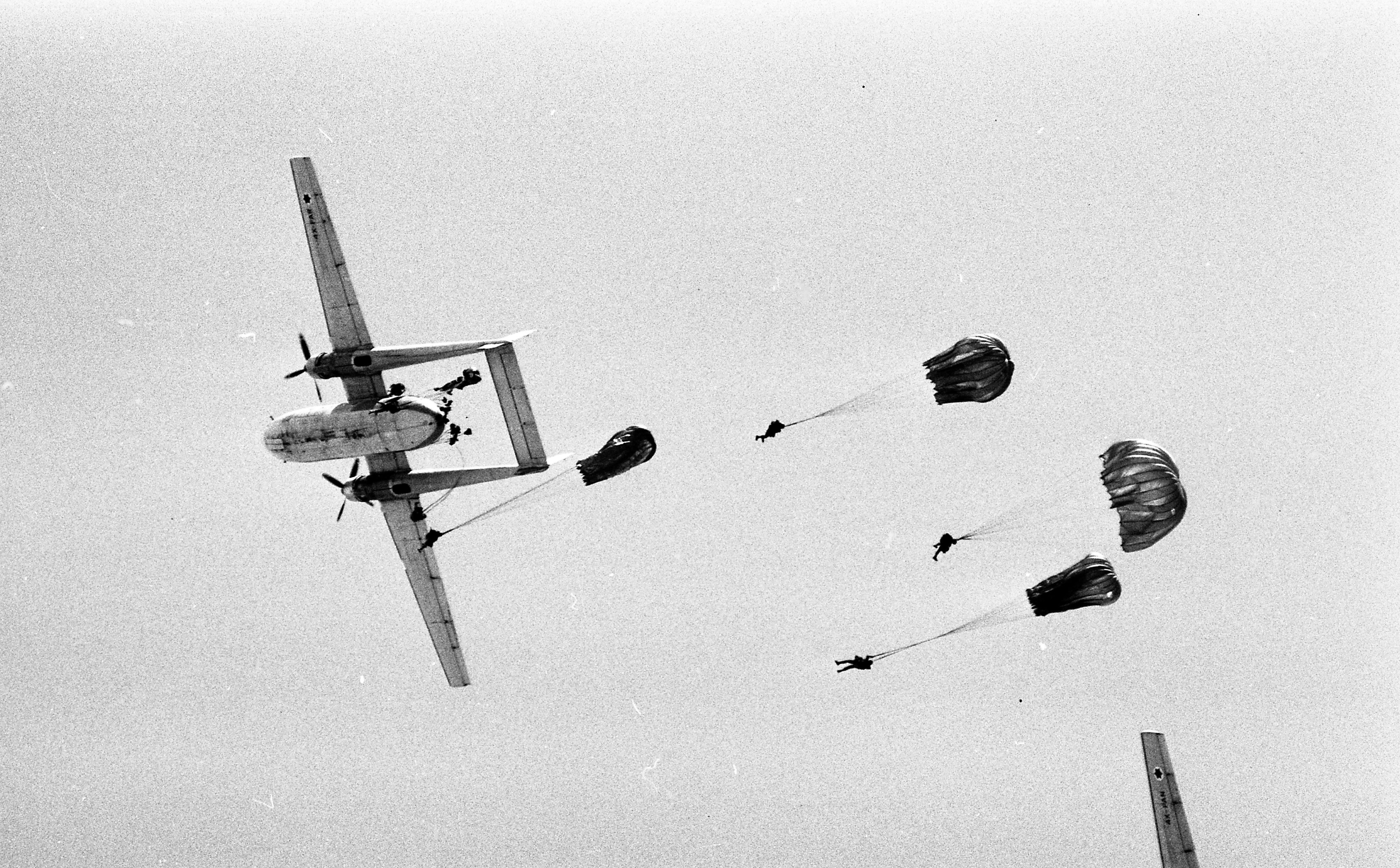
Israeli paratroopers are jumping from a Nord Noratlas in 1972

=== Paratroopers Main Memorial ===
One and a half kilometers west of Tel Nof lies the Paratroopers Main Memorial near National Road, which commemorates those who fell in these units (31°50′34″N 34°47′18″E).

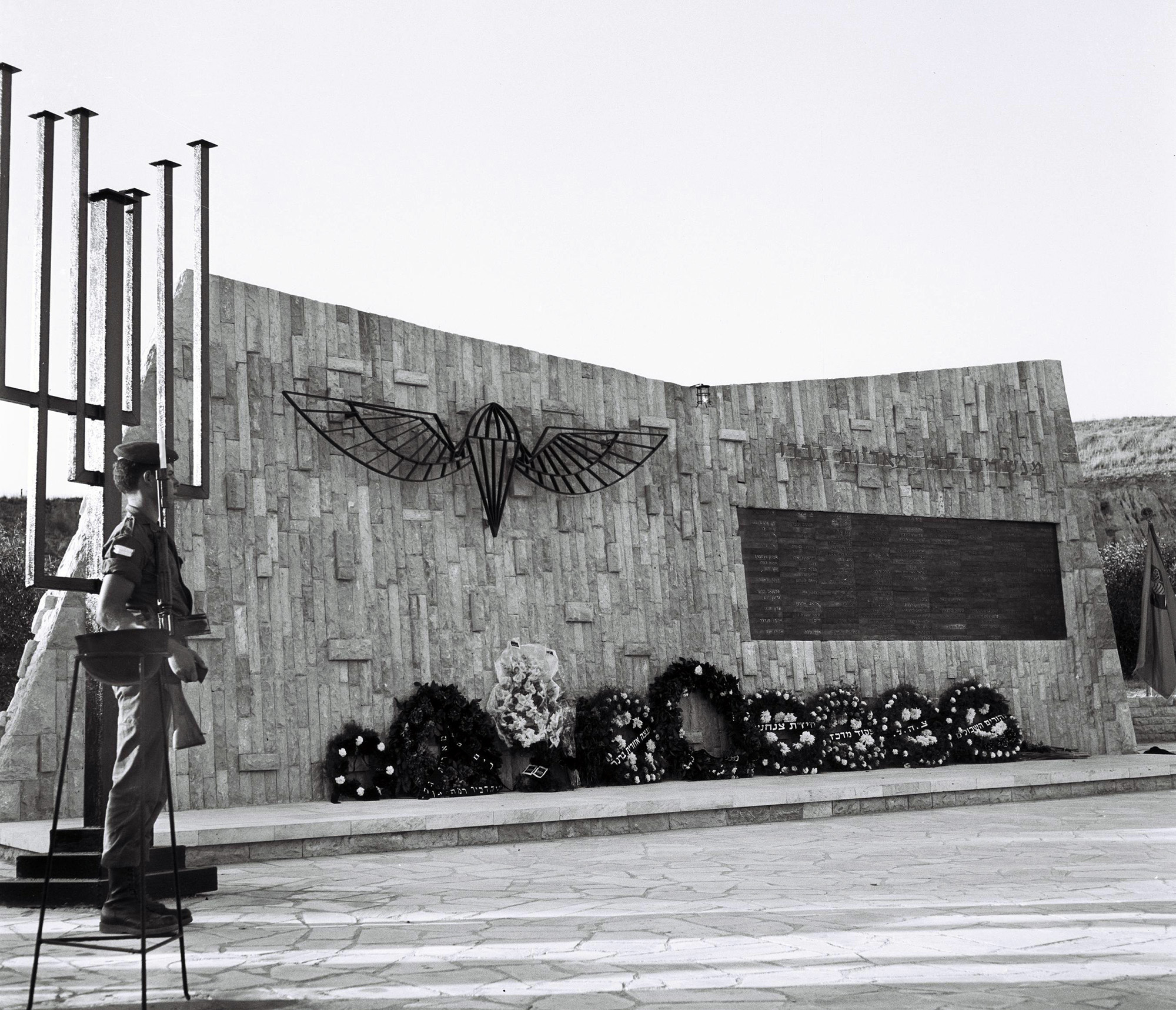
Inauguration of the Paratroopers Memorial on Remembrance Day (Yom HaZikaron) in spring 1960

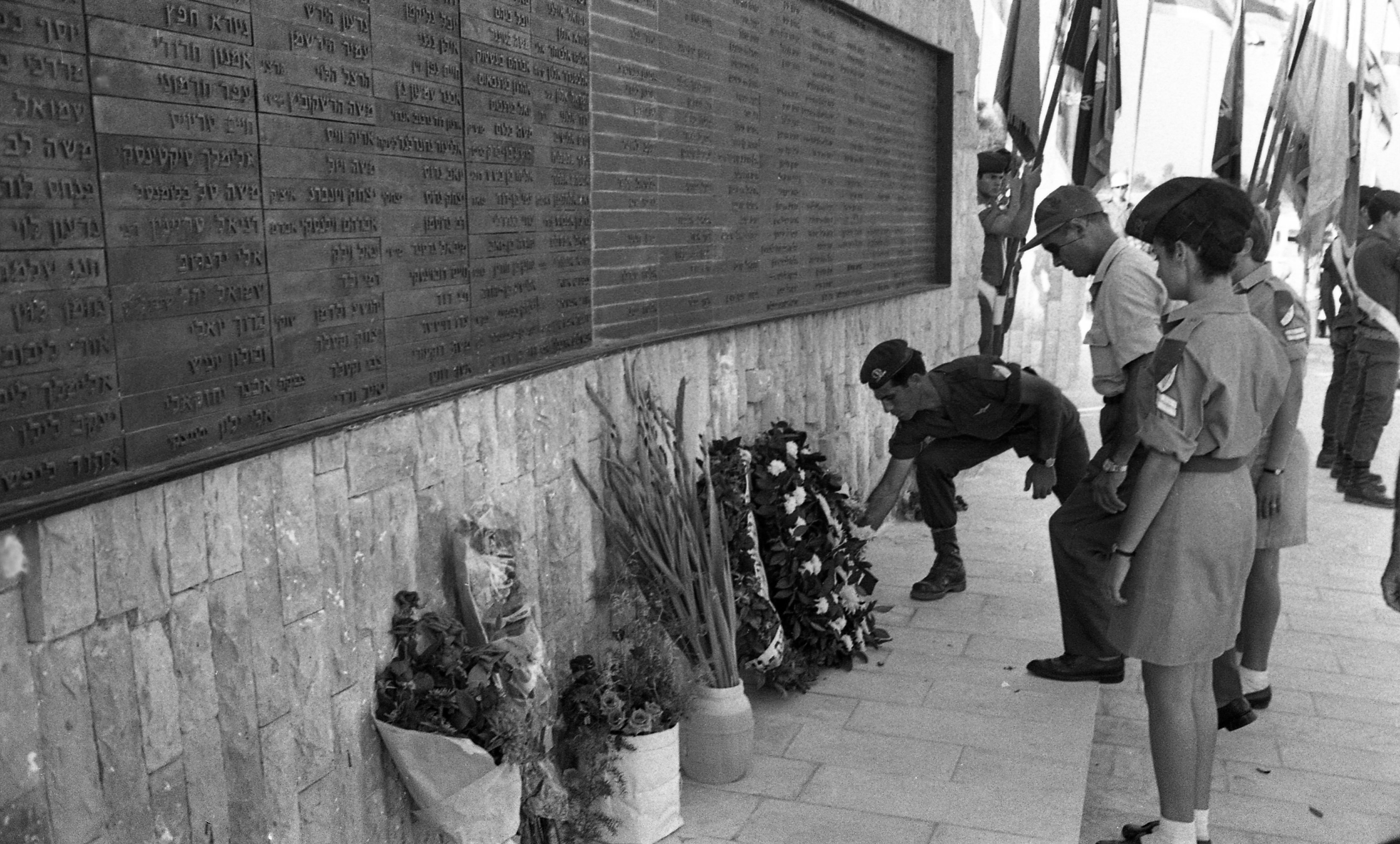
Then Israeli MoD Moshe Dayan (eye patch) has a wreath laid at the Paratroopers Memorial in Sept. 1969

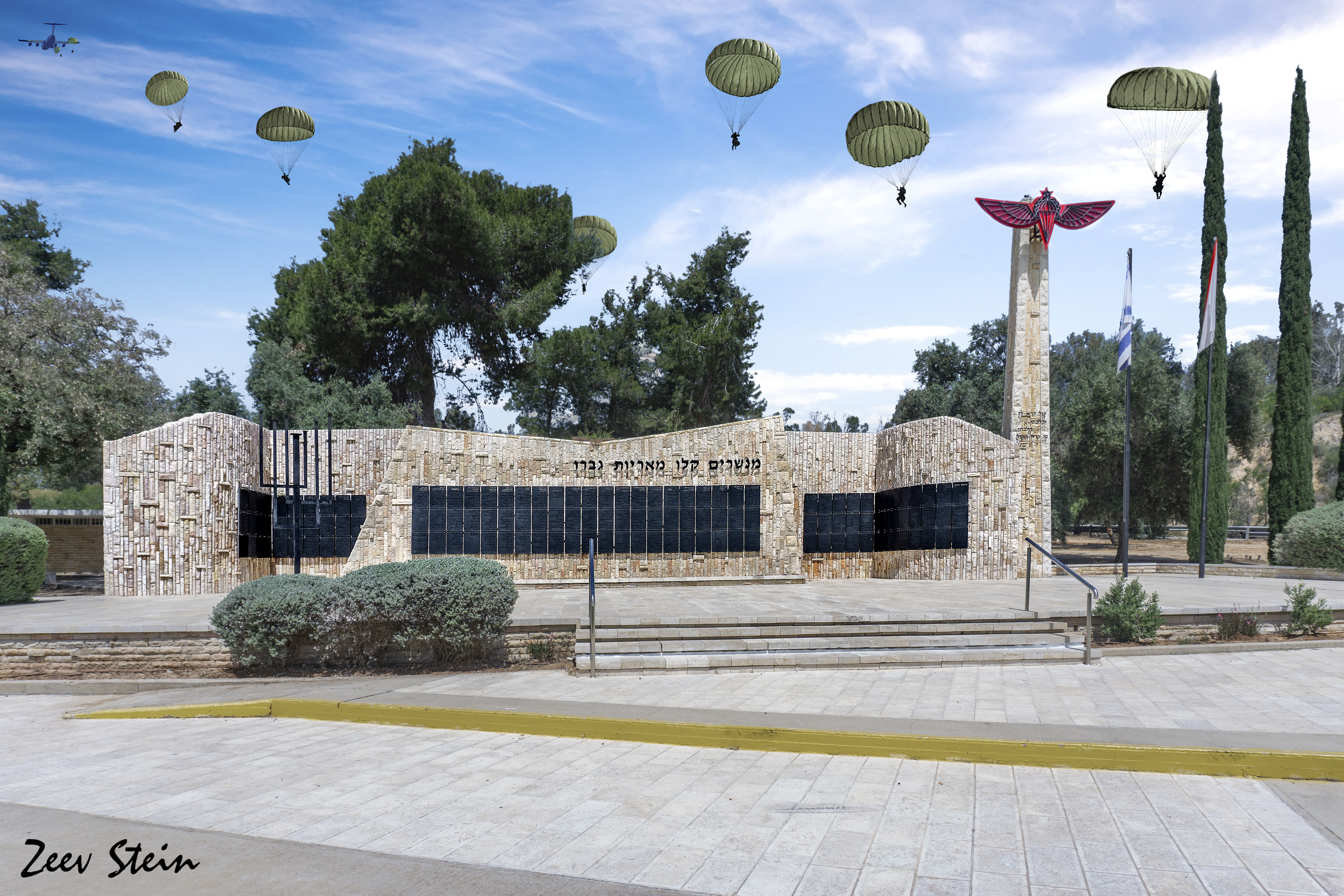
The Paratroopers Memorial in May 2020 – west of Tel Nof Airbase at National Road

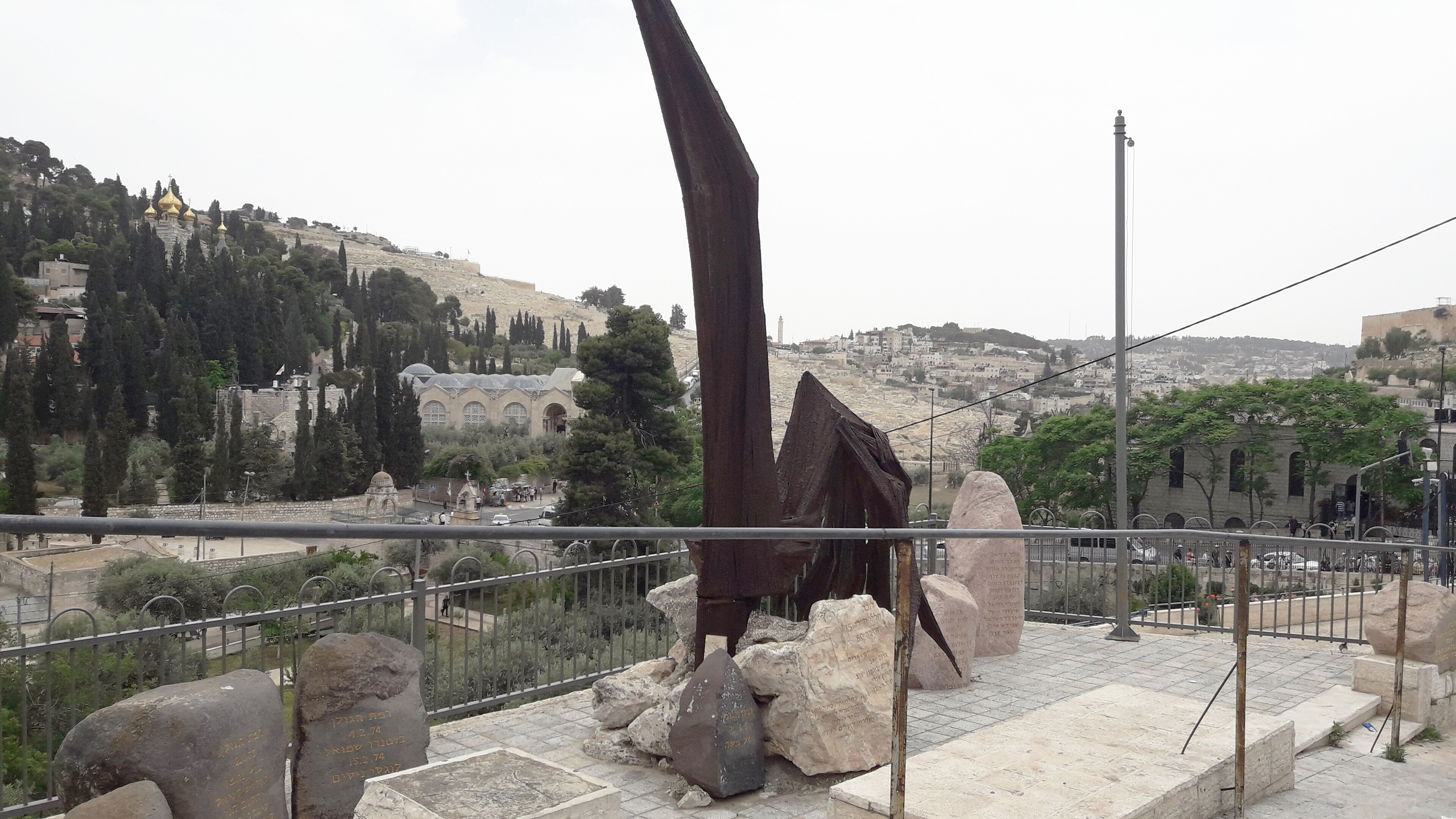
Another Paratroopers Memorial in Jerusalem, 160 m east of the Lions' Gate and the Old City

== Aircraft of the Middle East Wars ==
=== Palestine War ===
During the 1948 Palestine War the airbase was handed over by the British and renamed Ekron Airbase by the IDF. First fighter aircraft were stationed. See above under: First Israeli fighter aircraft and later: First jets at Tel Nof in 119 Squadron "Bat"

=== Suez Crisis ===
During the Suez Crisis in the fall of 1956, Tel Nof was one of three main airbases of the IAF, along with Ramat David and Hatzor. From here, Israeli paratroopers took off to capture strategic targets on the Sinai Peninsula. See above under: Paratroopers Brigade

IAF flight tests prior to the establishment of a flight test center at Tel Nof

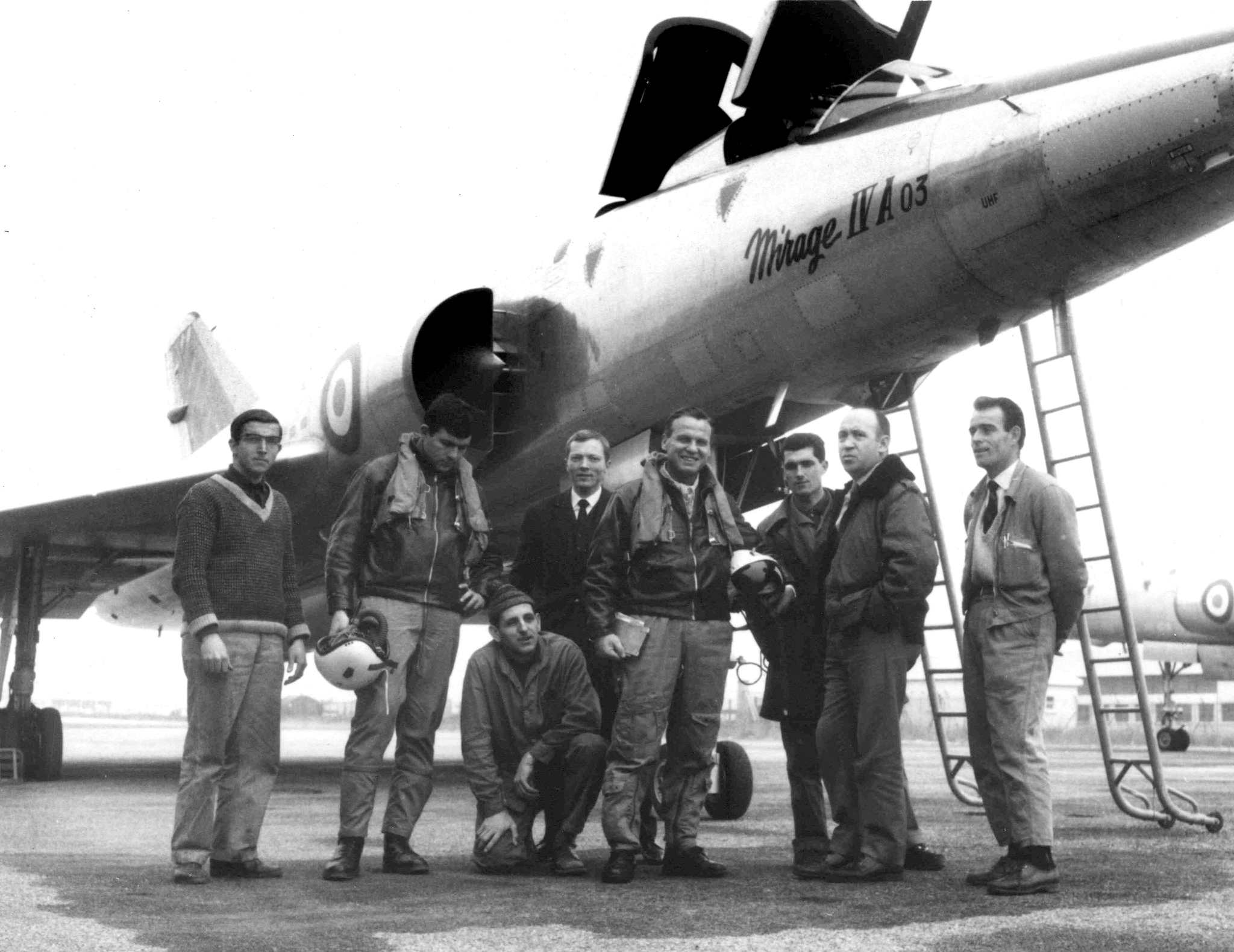
IAF chief test pilot Danny Shapira (center with helmet) with ground crew in February 1965 in front of a Mirage IV A prototype 03

From 1959 onwards, the IAF showed keen interest in the French Dassault Mirage IV, intending to use it as a high-speed, high-altitude reconnaissance aircraft. The Suez Crisis had demonstrated the importance of such an aircraft. France, however, intended to use the Mirage IV solely as a nuclear bomber and vehemently rejected any option of selling the large jet to Israel. Nevertheless, IAF chief test pilot Danny Shapira managed – as a favor from the director of the French flight test center, chief engineer Pommaret, a close friend of him – to conduct several test flights in the new jet (see photo).

In February 1971, Israel finally received several units of the RF-4E Phantom II from the US (see photo a little further down) – a reconnaissance variant of the F-4 – enabling it to carry out the missions that had not come to pass with the Mirage IV: high-altitude, high-speed reconnaissance flights. The IAF gave the RF-4E the name Orev, which means "Raven".

The IAF flight test center Manat was not established as an independent unit at Tel Nof until 1974.

=== Six-Day War ===
As late as the Six-Day War in June 1967, French fighter jets manufactured by Dassault Aviation played a leading role in the IAF, such as the Mystère IV, the Super Mystère and the Mirage III. Many of these jets were also stationed at Tel Nof at that time. In the mid-1960s, Israel had commissioned Dassault to build an improved version of the Mirage III that was specifically tailored to the needs of the IAF, as they needed a ground attack aircraft in a desert environment. The first examples of this version, called the Mirage 5, were supposed to be delivered in 1967, but this never happened.

With the exception of the Mirage IV and the Mirage 5 – which Israel ultimately did not receive – all earlier French fighter jets are currently on display at the IAF Museum adjacent to Hatzerim Airbase:

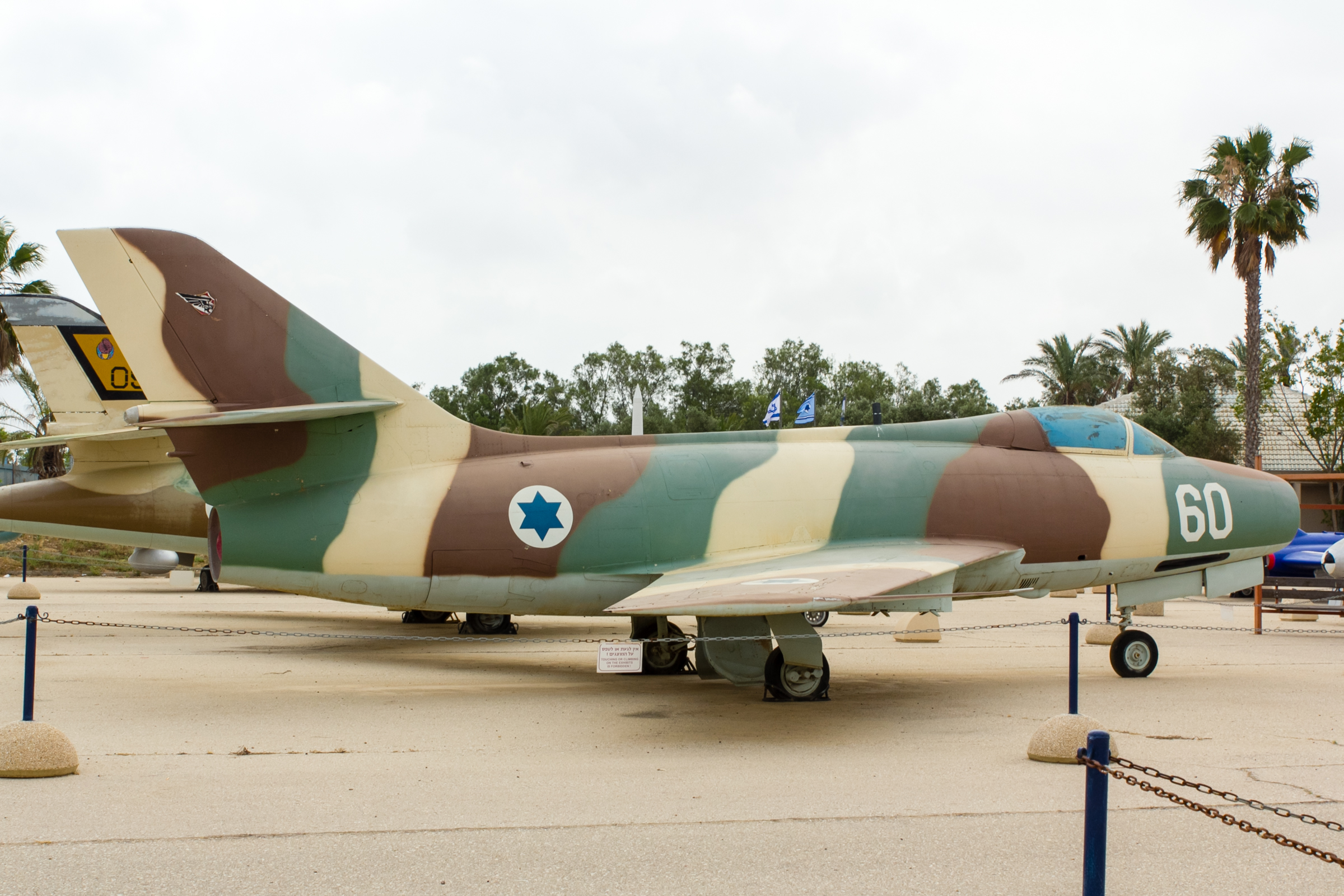
A Dassault Mystère IV A jet of 116 Squadron "Defenders Of The South", based on Tel Nof in the 1960s

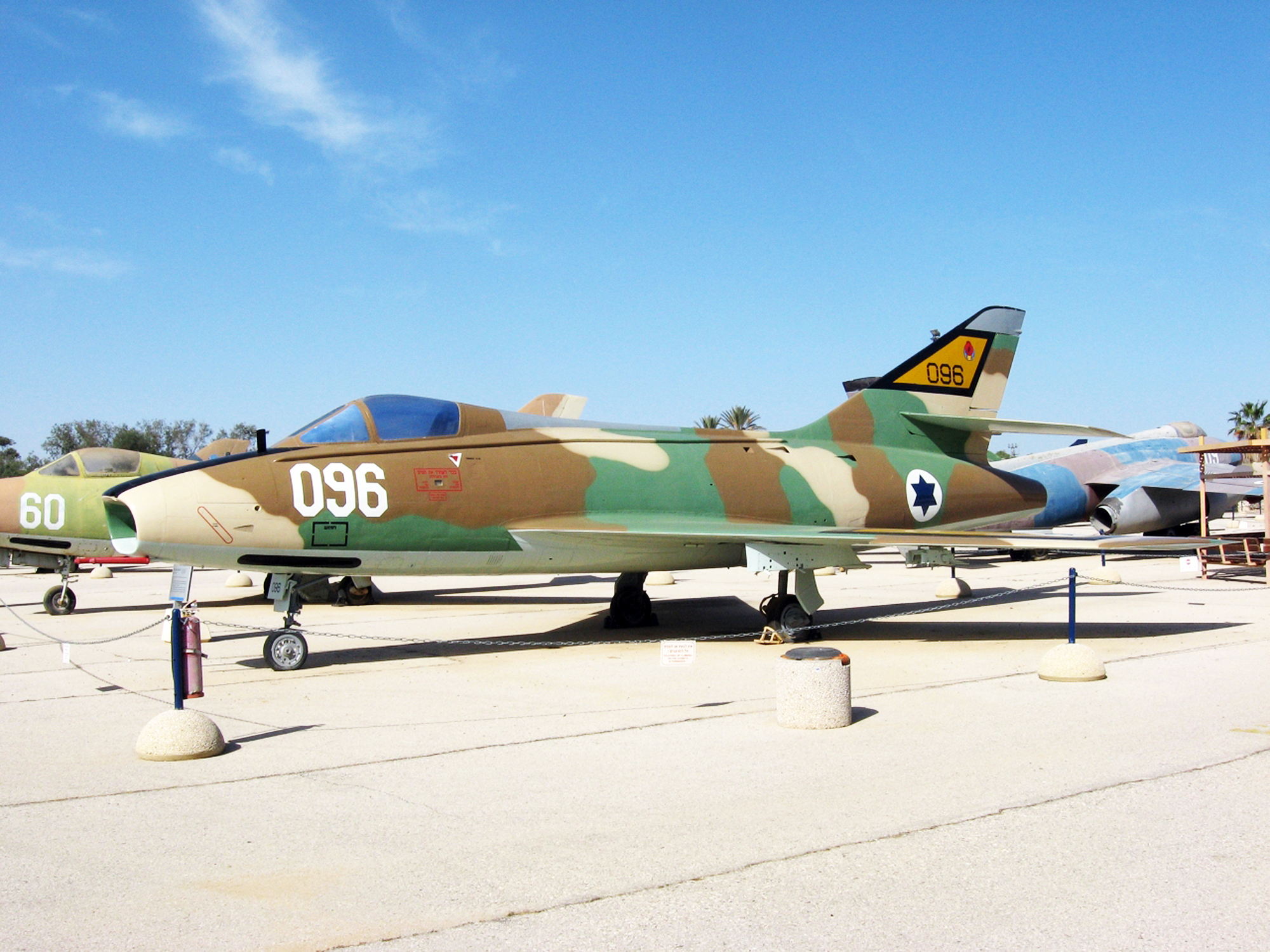
Dassault Super Mystère B2 Sambad of 105 Squadron "Scorpion", the only IAF squadron with that aircraft

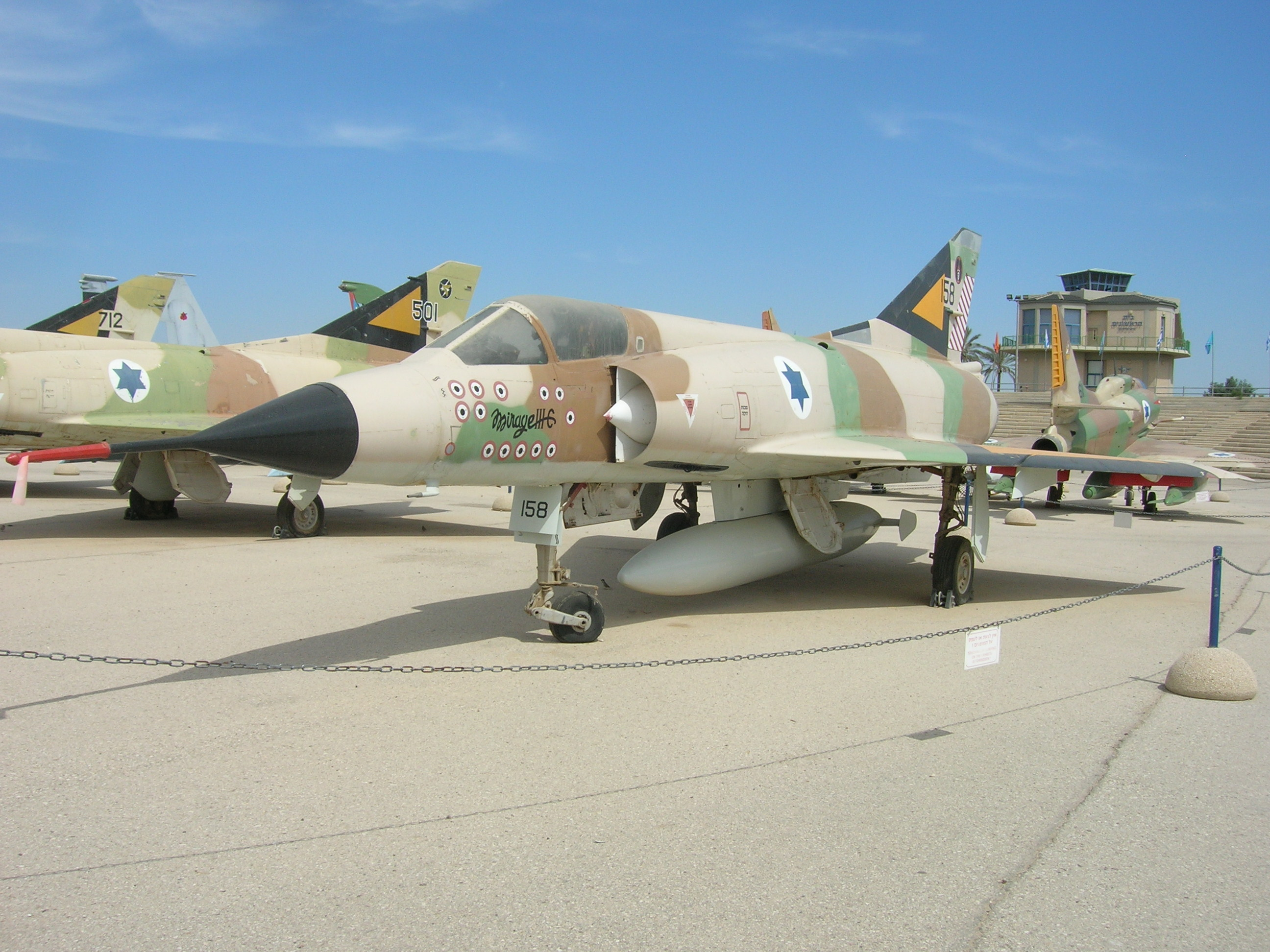
A Dassault Mirage IIICJ Shahak, was also flown by 119 Squadron "Bat" at Tel Nof Airbase in the 1960s

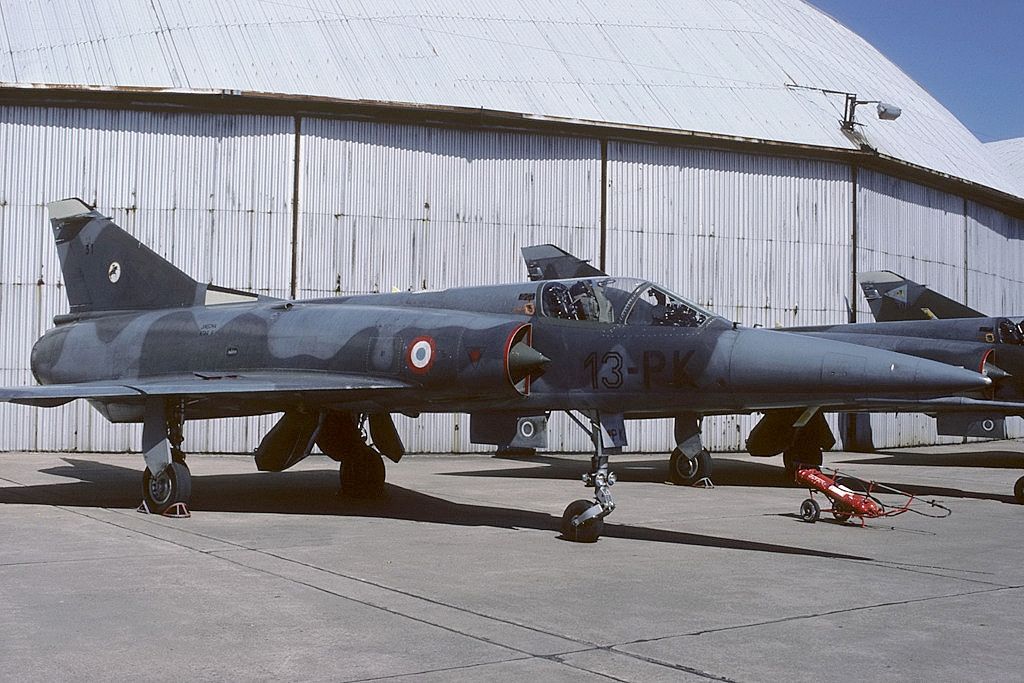
Dassault Mirage 5 of the French Air Force, of which 50 copies were to be delivered to Israel from 1967

In response to the Six-Day War, the delivery of 50 already produced and largely paid for Dassault Mirage 5 jets to Israel was stopped by French President Charles de Gaulle, as he no longer wanted to supply new offensive weapons to the former ally. After Israeli commando units blew up 14 Lebanese airliners at Beirut Airport on the evening of 28 December 1968 in Operation Gift – using French transport helicopters Super Frelon from Tel Nof and naval boats supplied by France – de Gaulle then imposed a total arms embargo on Israel.

=== War of Attrition ===
When Israel no longer received offensive weapons from France after the Six-Day War, it sought replacements from the United States, as the War of Attrition with Egypt, which began in mid-1968, required considerable resources. Over time, the US and other countries provided the IAF with over 250 heavy strike fighter jets of the new F-4E Phantom II Kurnass and RF-4E Orev (R for reconnaissance), which were also stationed in a squadron at Tel Nof. In addition, they delivered around 350 light strike fighter jets A-4H/N Skyhawk Ayit, of which many were based at Tel Nof also. At the beginning of the War of Attrition, the French Dassault Mystère IV and Dassault Mirage III jets could still be used (also from Tel Nof), until their numbers gradually decreased over time due to a lack of spare parts or being shot down.

=== Yom Kippur War ===
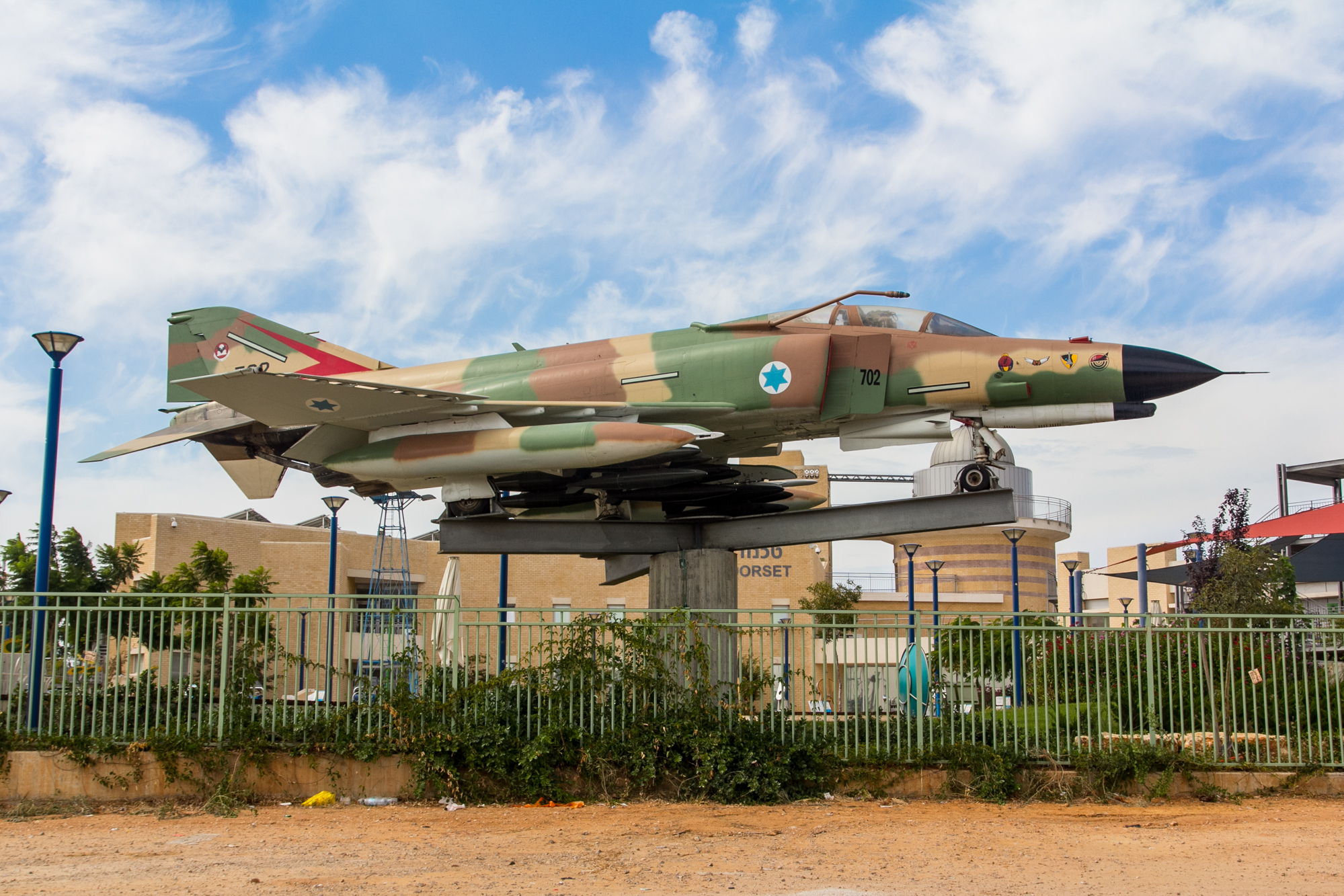
An F-4E Phantom II Kurnass of 119 Squadron "Bat" (see tail) and the four other squadrons (see front) at the Giv'at Olga Technoda in Hadera

Despite the French arms embargoes of 1967 and 1968 the Tel Nof Airbase had been steadily expanded over the years, and during the Yom Kippur War in October 1973, seven air squadrons operated at the base. While the Six-Day War of 1967 was still characterized by French-made fighter aircraft, US ones now dominate.

The seven squadrons at Tel Nof during the Yom Kippur War:

- 119 Squadron "Bat" with F-4E Phantom II Kurnass heavy strike fighter jets
- 115 Squadron "Flying Dragon" with A-4H/N Skyhawk Ayit light strike fighter jets
- 116 Squadron "Defenders Of The South" with A-4H/N Skyhawk Ayit light strike fighter jets
- 118 Squadron "Night Raptors" with CH-53D Sea Stallion Yas'ur heavy transport helicopters
- 114 Squadron "Night Carriers" with Super Frelon Tzirʿa heavy transport helicopters
- 124 Squadron "Rolling Sword" with Bell 205/206 light general-purpose helicopters
- 103 Squadron "Elephants" with Nord Noratlas transport aircraft

The US-made airplanes of that time are now on display at the IAF Museum next to Hatzerim Airbase:

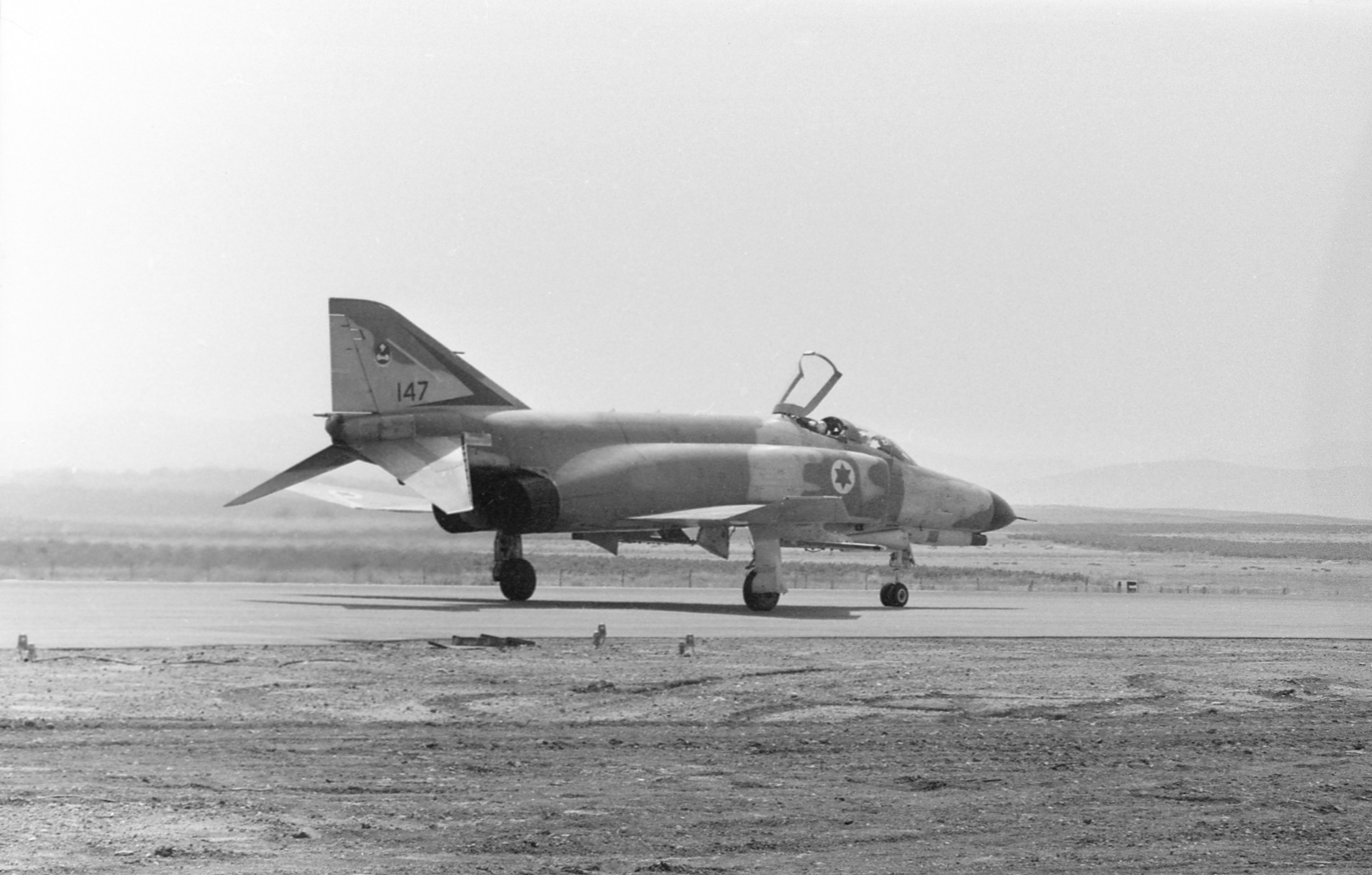
An RF-4E Phantom II Orev of 119 Squadron "Bat" at Tel Nof Airbase in 1974 just after the Yom Kippur War

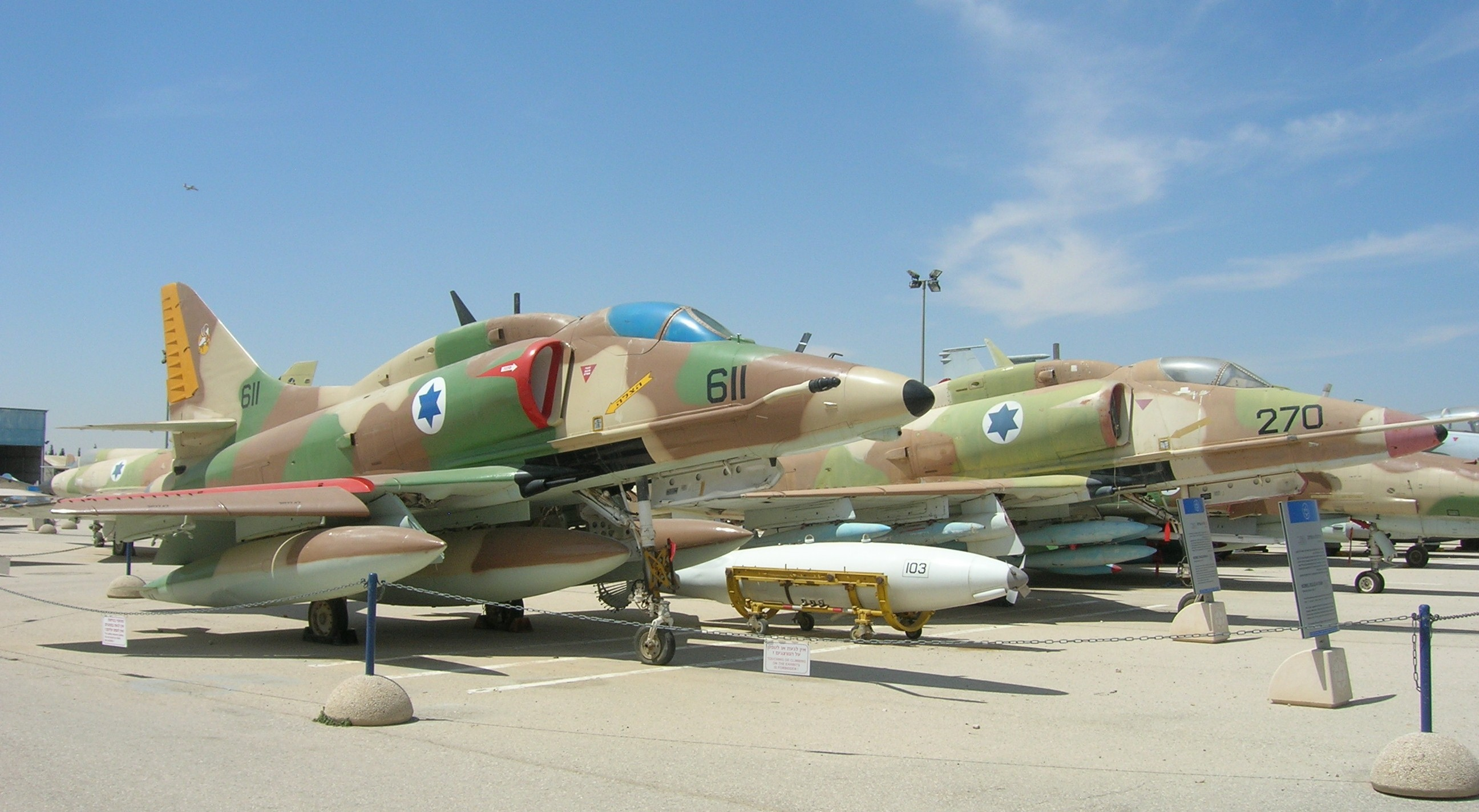
A-4N & A-4H Skyhawk Ayit (from left) of 147 Squadron "Goring Ram", stationed in two squadrons at Tel Nof

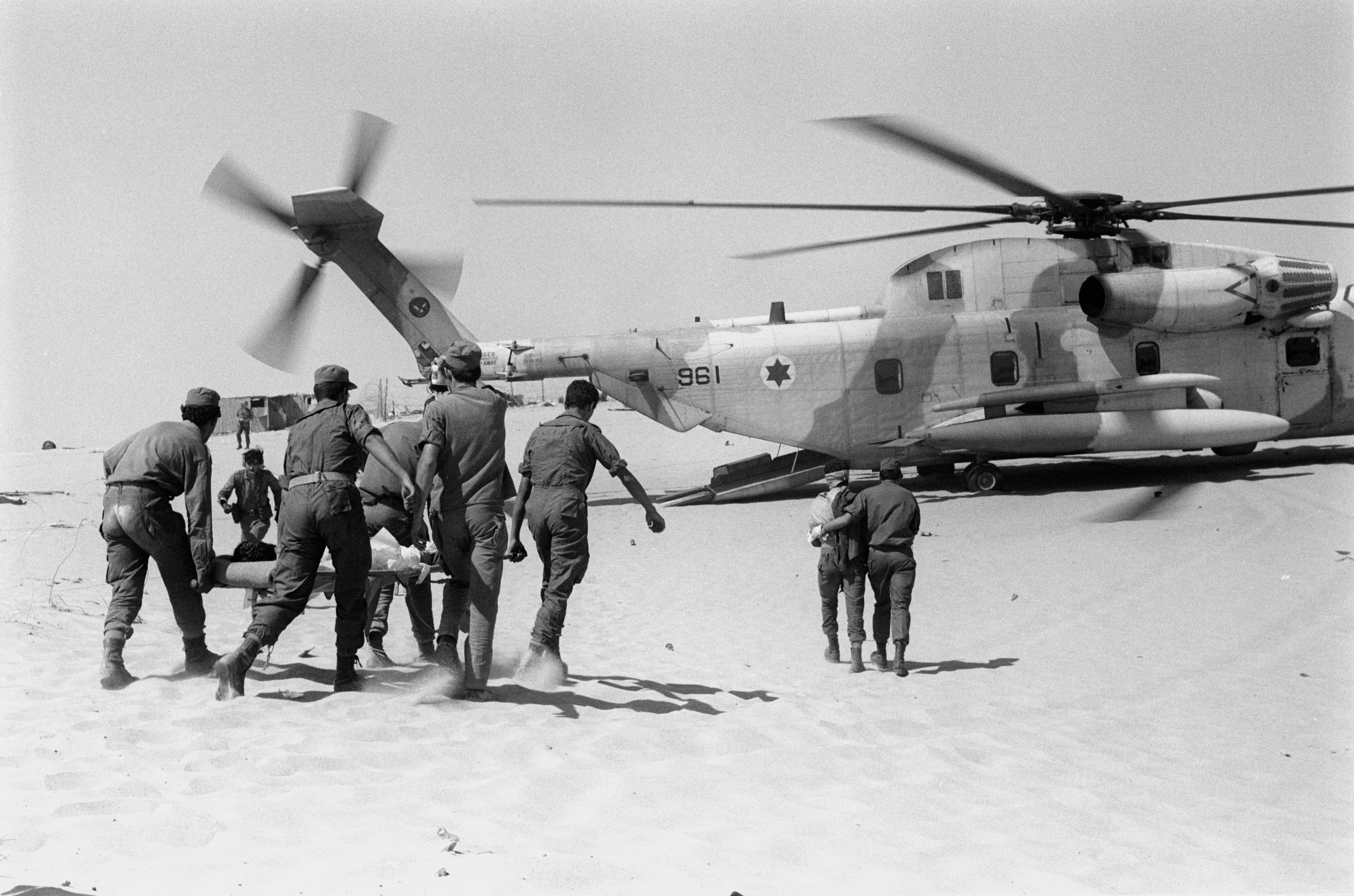
CH-53D Sea Stallion Yas'ur of 118 Squadron "Night Raptors" from Tel Nof during the Yom Kippur War 1973

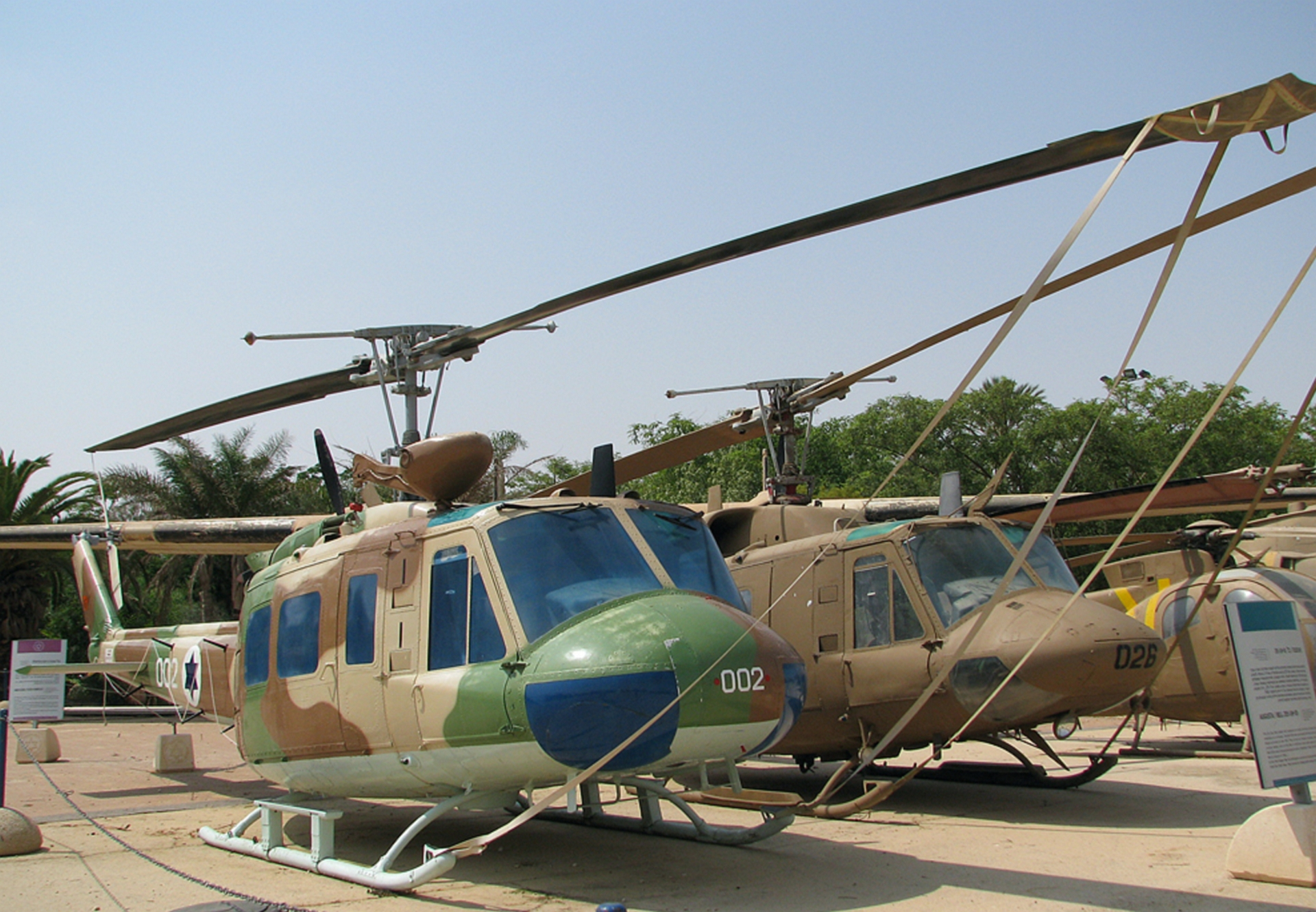
Bell 205/206 and Bell 212 (from left) general-purpose helicopters of 124 Squadron "Rolling Sword"

The total of twelve (or sixteen) Super Frelon Tzirʿa transport helicopters that Israel had received from France before the embargo were stationed in the 114 Squadron "Night Carriers" at Tel Nof from 1966 to 1991 and were retrofitted with more powerful US engines until they were finally all decommissioned. The more than twenty French but German-built and delivered Nord Noratlas transport aircraft of the 103 Squadron "Elephants" at Tel Nof were in service there from 1956 to 1978. Most of them were former machines of the German Air Force (Deutsche Luftwaffe) or were built under license in Germany and handed over or delivered to Israel from the early 1960s.

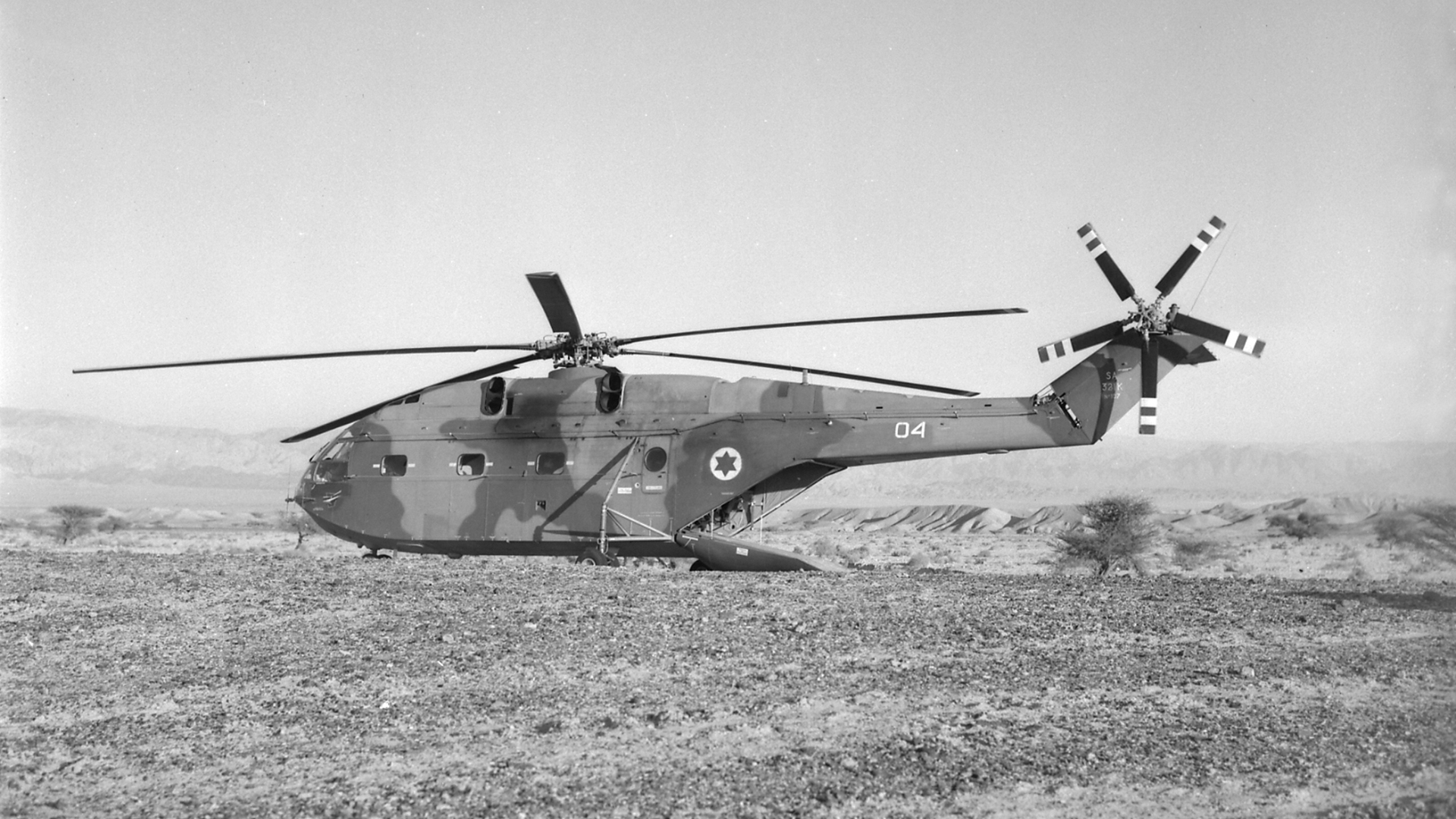
A French-made Super Frelon Tzirʿa transport helicopter of 114 Squadron "Night Carriers" during the 1960s

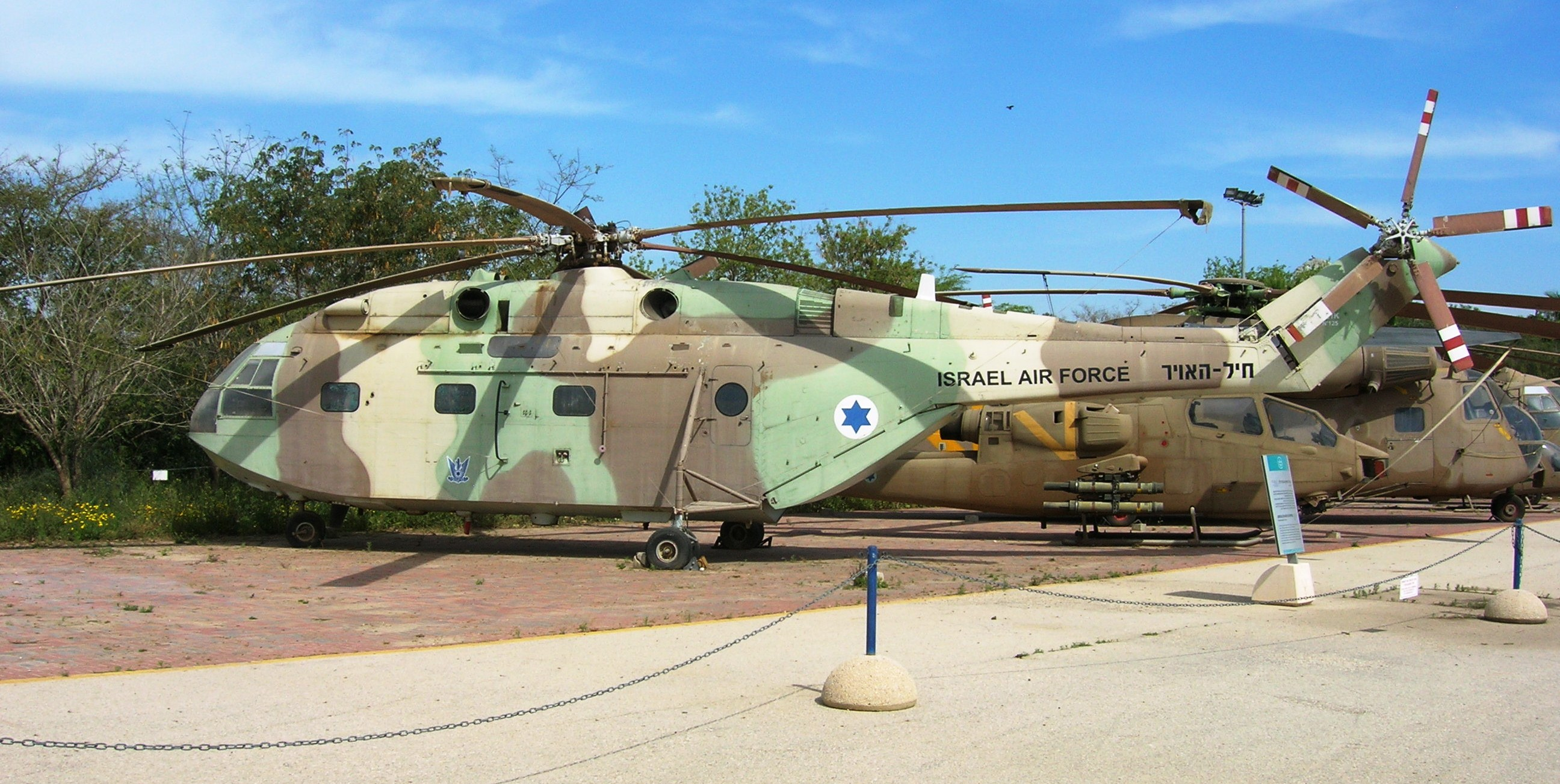
A Super Frelon transport helicopter, later with US-made engines, at the IAF Museum near Hatzerim Airbase

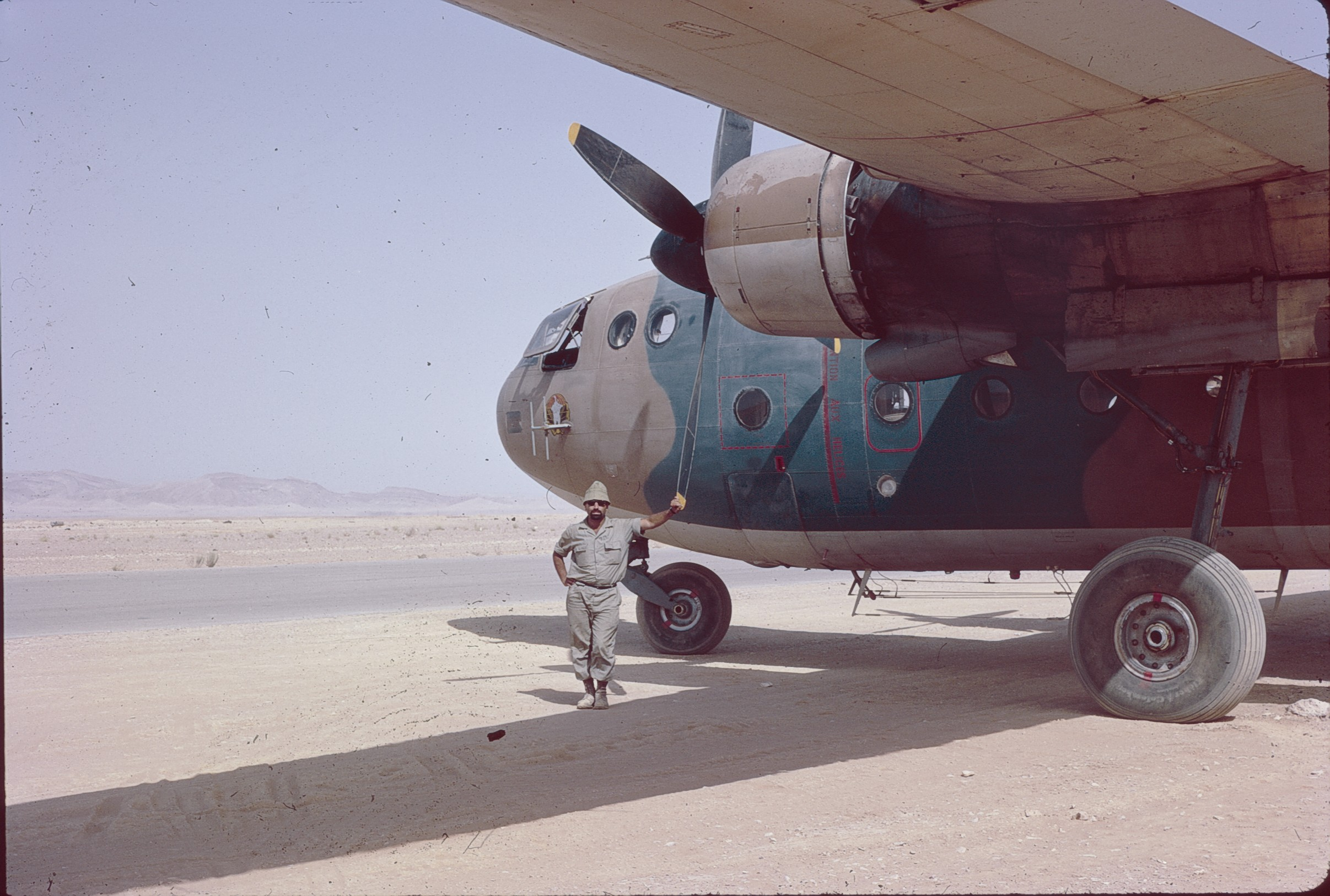
A Nord Noratlas transport aircraft of 103 Squadron "Elephants" (see nose) during the Six-Day War in June 1967

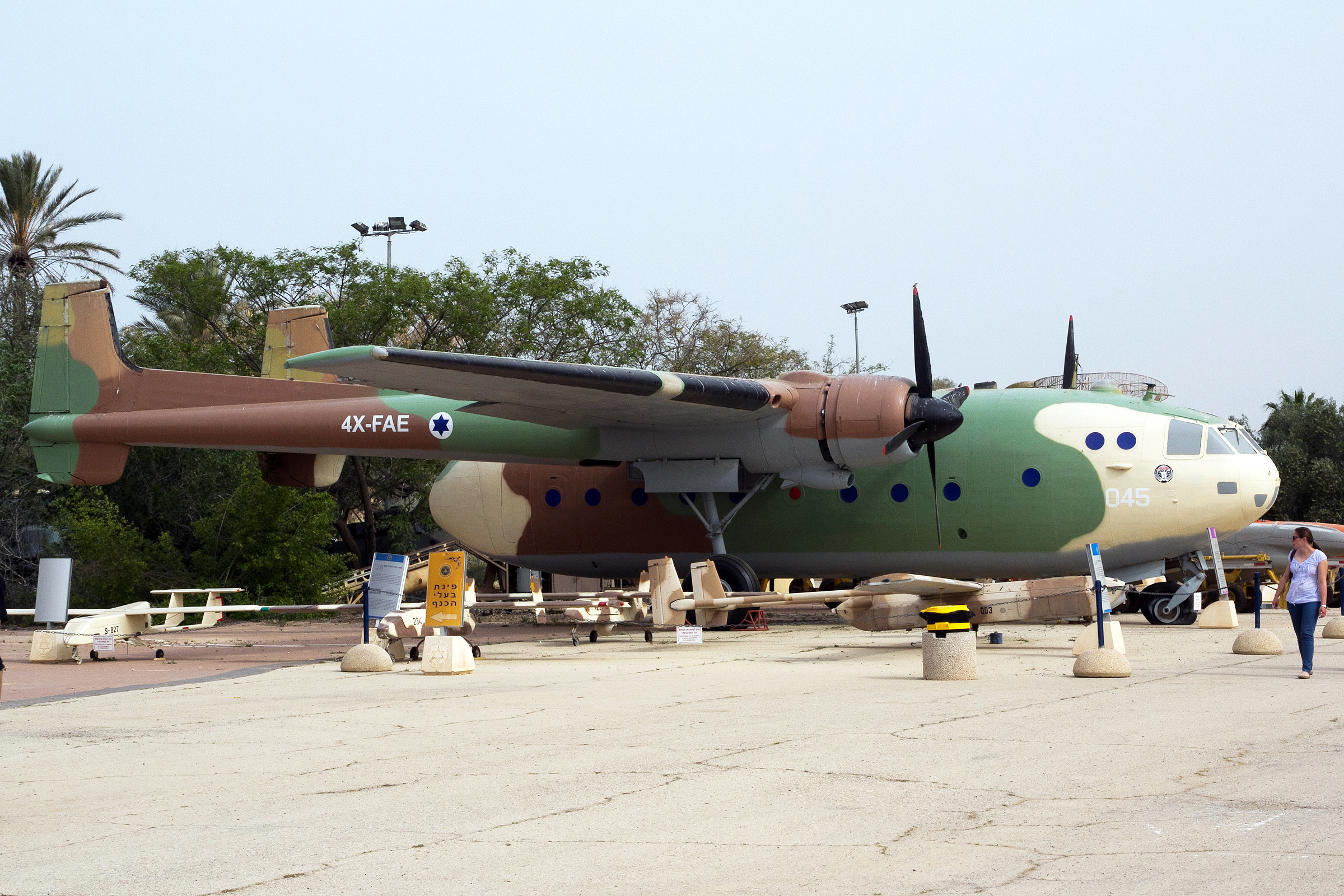
A French but German-built Nord Noratlas transport aircraft of 103 Squadron "Elephants"

== F-15 Fighter Jets ==
=== Arrival of the F-15 ===
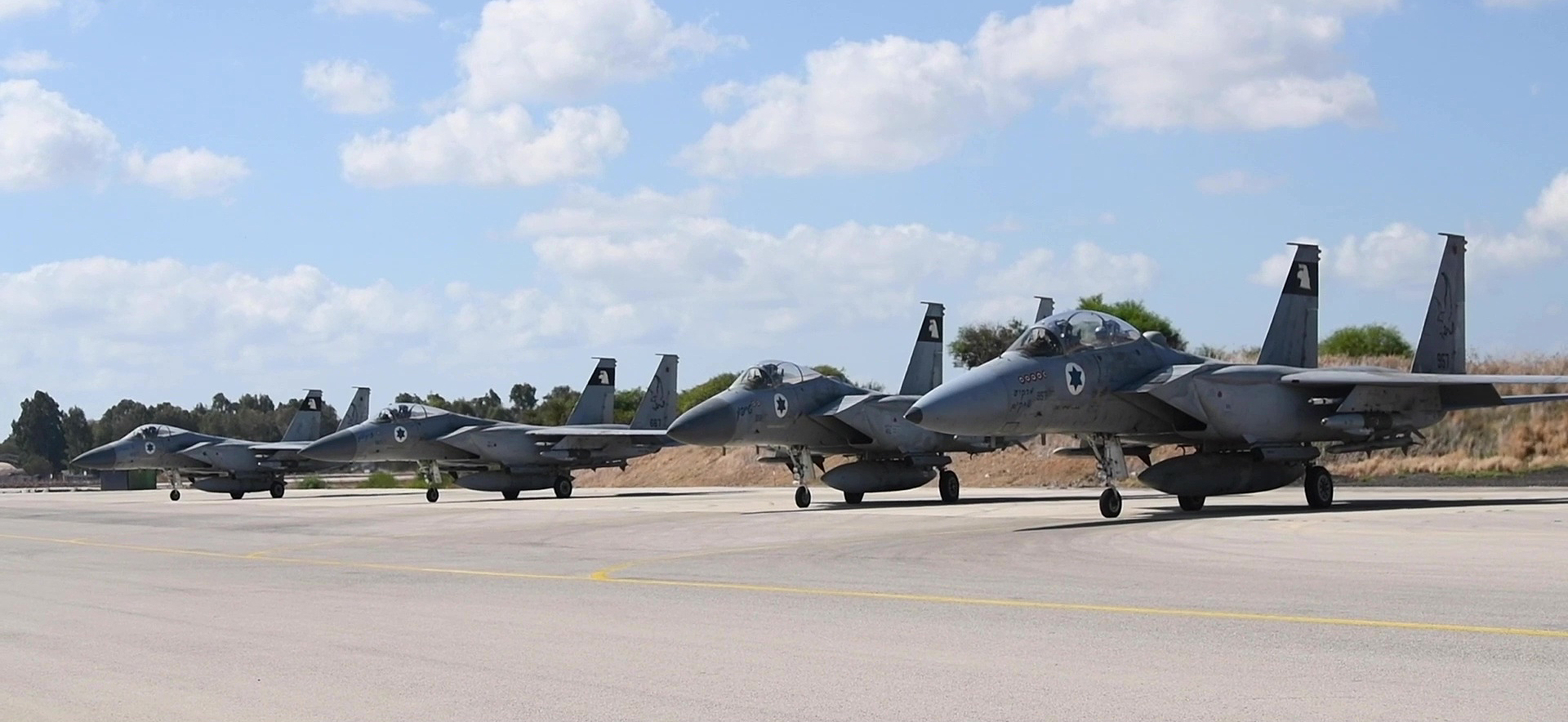
Three F-15C jets and an F-15D (l.t.r.) of 133 Squadron "Knights Of The Twin Tail" at Tel Nof, all of which can also attack ground targets, before retaliatory strikes on Yemen at the end of September 2024

From 1976, the then new F-15A/B Eagle Baz fighter jets were introduced with 133 Squadron "Knights Of The Twin Tail", which made Israel the first country in the world outside the United States to possess this aircraft. Because the landing of the first three planes was delayed on that Friday, 10 December 1976, the reception ceremony was also delayed and only ended shortly before the beginning of Shabbat. As a result, some government ministers didn't have enough time to return home before the start of Shabbat. Its "desecration" led to a government crisis and ultimately to the collapse of the coalition of the first government of Yitzhak Rabin.

Not long after receiving the first F-15 aircraft, Israel began to upgrade and convert these jets, which were originally built for air combat only, for use against ground targets also. This was done with both the single-seat A and C variants, as well as the two-seat B and D trainer versions, where the flight instructor's seat was converted to that of the navigator (Israeli designation) or WSO (see photo of converted F-15C/D jets to the right above).

In June 1982, with the reopening of the 106 Squadron "Spearhead", a second squadron of improved F-15C/D Baz fighter jets was introduced at Tel Nof. Both F-15 squadrons still exist today, and from 2031 they will receive the latest variant F-15IA (Israel Advanced), which is based on the F-15EX Eagle II of the US Air Force (see photo of an F-15EX in gallery below).

=== Operation Wooden Leg ===
On 1 October 1985, under the name Operation Wooden Leg, eight two-seat F-15B/D Eagle Baz from Tel Nof attacked the headquarters of the PLO near Tunis. On their 2,300 km long flight to the destination on the Mediterranean coast of Tunisia the F-15s were refueled several times by two Boeing 707 Re'em. The headquarters were completely destroyed and – depending on the source – 50 to 75 PLO fighters were killed, including many leaders, but not Palestinian leader Yasser Arafat. The action was condemned without dissent in the UNO, and the USA also criticized it because it strained its relationship with Tunisia. The eight F-15 jets from Tel Nof involved received a corresponding symbol (target cross in the red circle with a blue wooden leg, see picture in the gallery below).

=== Nuclear weapons ===
It is assumed (e.g. by the Bulletin of the Atomic Scientists) that Israel is in possession of nuclear weapons since the late 1960s and that they are stored and maintained at some point at Tel Nof in a specially secured area (presumably here: 31°50′52″N 34°48′53″E) near a weapons load station and at the neighboring Sdot Micha Airbase in bunkers (presumably here: 31°45′21″N 34°55′03″E) near the positions of Jericho missiles. Strike fighter jets that can carry such weapons over long distances, such as the F-15 Eagle today (see gallery below) and the F-4E Phantom II in the past (see pictures above), have been on alert at the base around the clock since the 1970s, when the first Phantoms were stationed there in the 119 Squadron "Bat". This form of deterrence was one of the lessons that Israel learned from the wars with its neighbors, even though the country has not yet admitted that it has nuclear weapons.

=== F-15 variants at Tel Nof ===
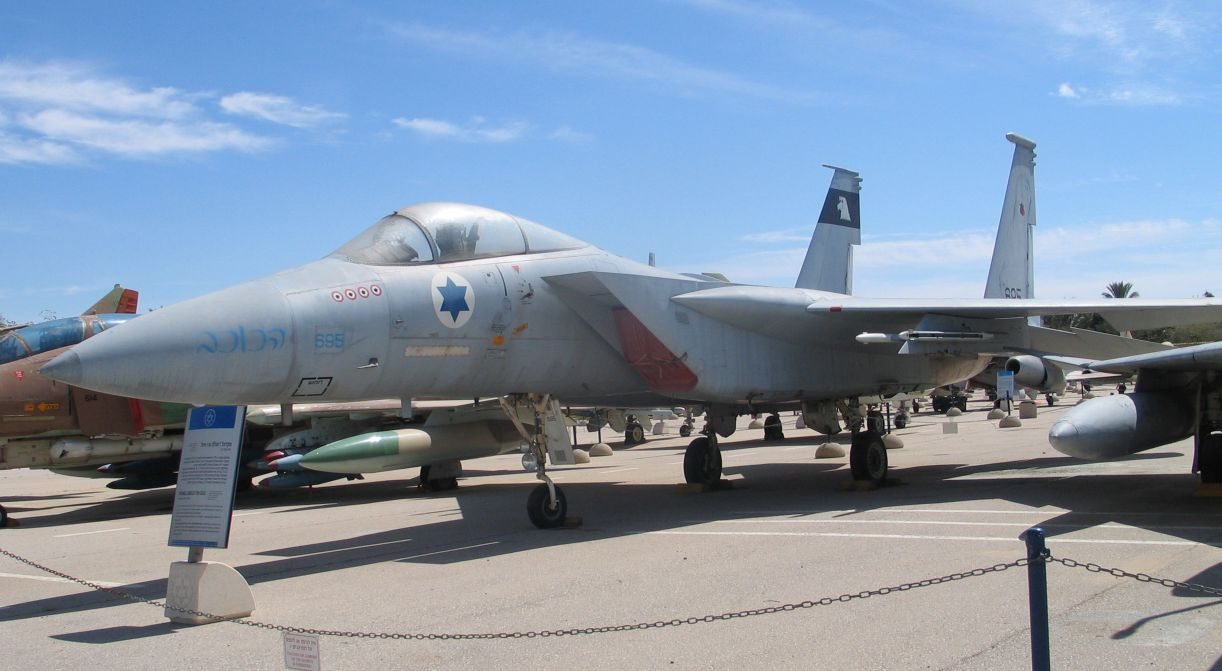
One of the first F-15A Eagle Baz of 133 Squadron "Knights Of The Twin Tail" at the IAF Museum next to Hatzerim Airbase in 2006

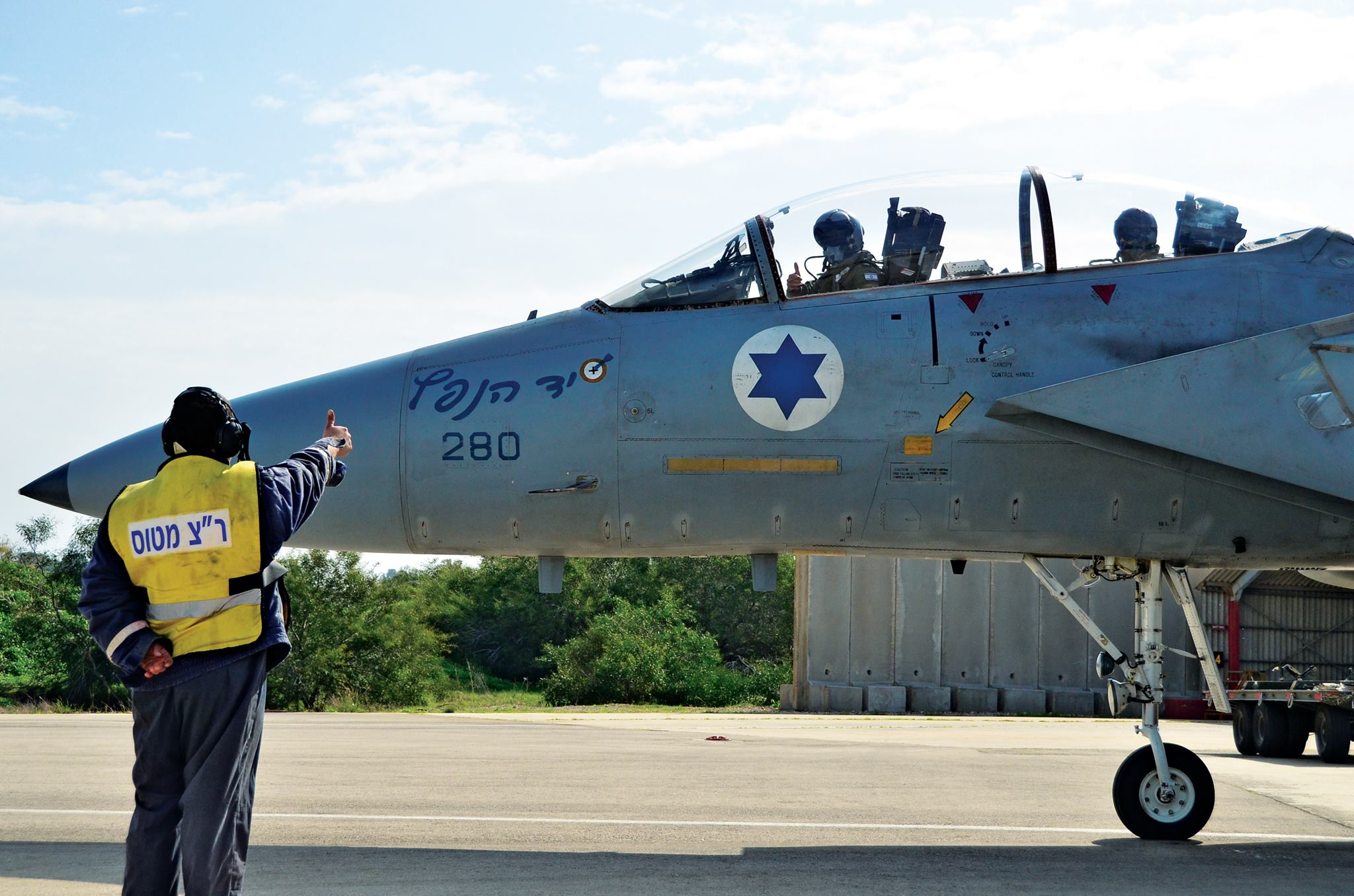
An F-15D Eagle Baz from Tel Nof involved in Operation Wooden Leg with blue wooden leg symbol (left to the Star of David) in 2015

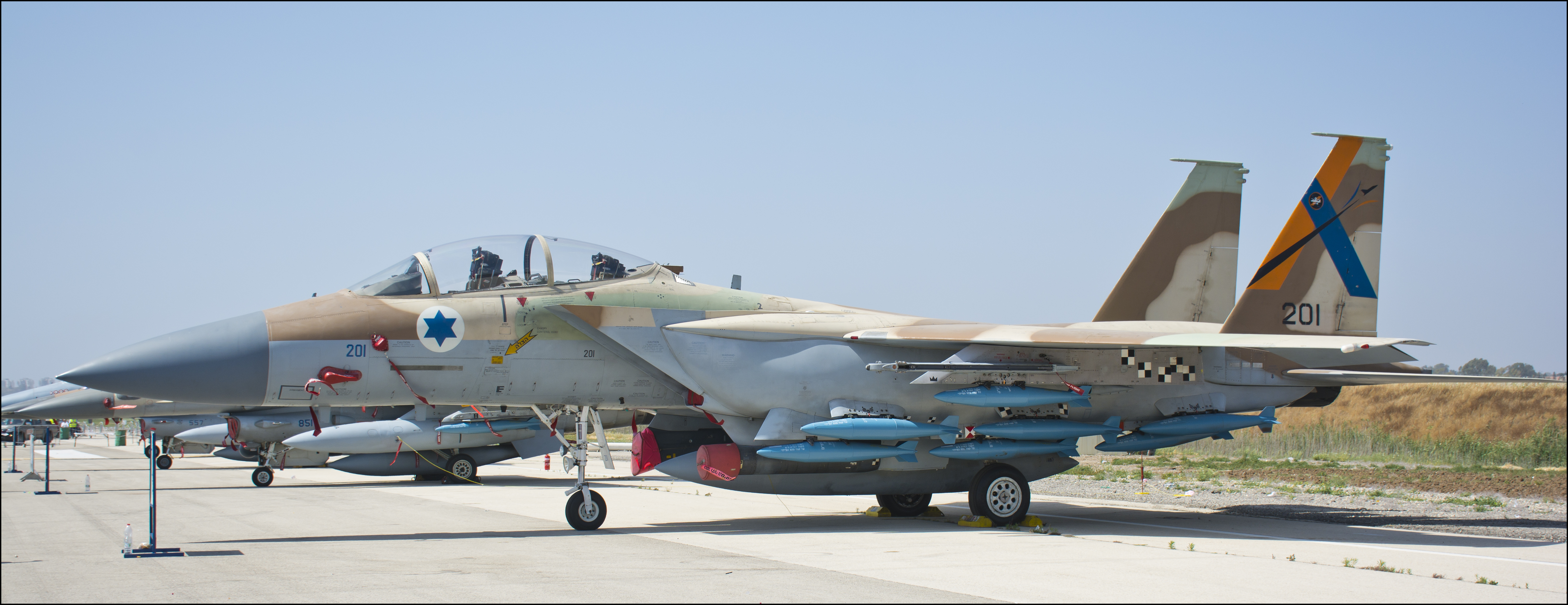
The F-15I Eagle Ra'am #201 of the Flight Test Center Manat at Tel Nof (see special symbol on tail) during an exhibition in 2017

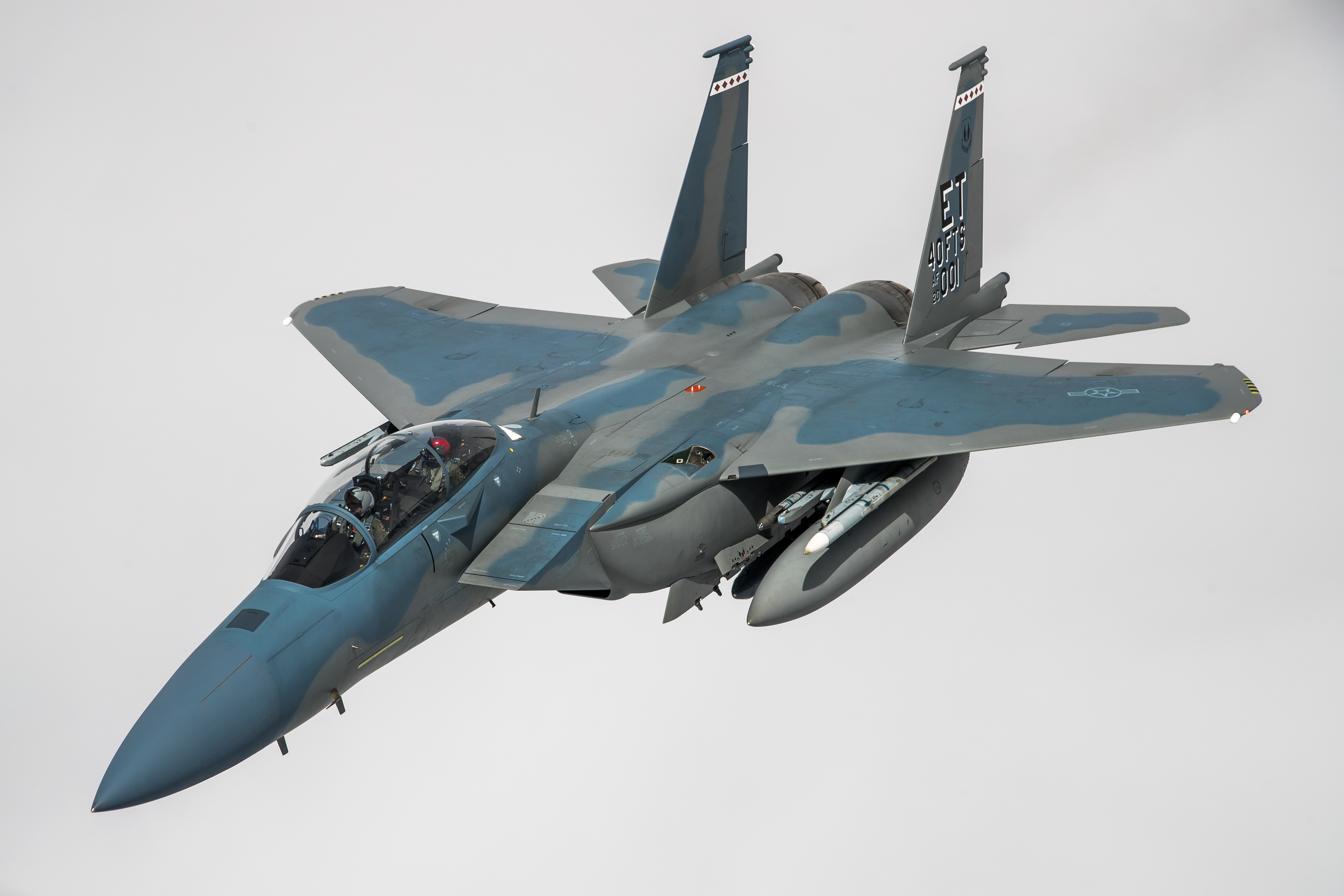
From 2031, fifty F-15IAs, based on the USAF's new F-15EX Eagle II, will replace the aging F-15A/B/C/D Baz at Tel Nof

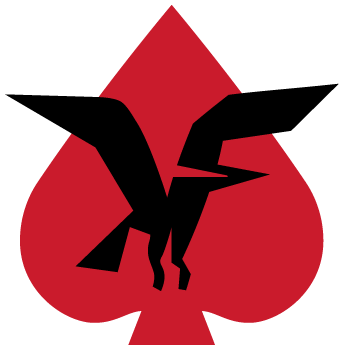
Current symbol of 133 Squadron "Knights Of The Twin Tail", initially operating F-15A/B, now F-15C/D at Tel Nof Airbase

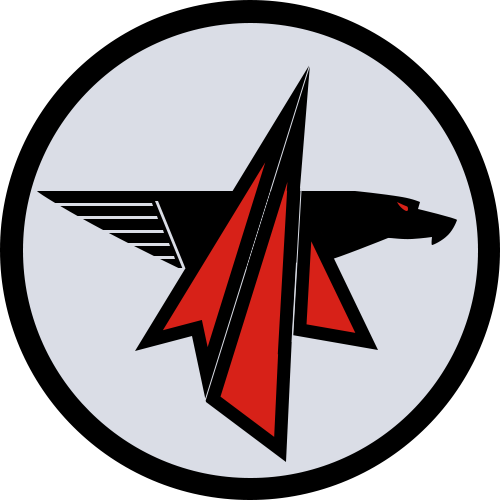
Current symbol of 106 Squadron "Spearhead", operating F-15C/D at Tel Nof Airbase

== Today ==
Tel Nof is home to two strike fighter jet and two transport helicopter squadrons as well as a drone squadron. Also located there is the Flight Test Center Manat with one example of all aircraft variants (see F-15I Eagle Ra'am in the gallery above and F-35I Adir in the gallery under "Units"). Several special units of the Israel Defense Forces (IDF) are also located there, including Unit 669 heliborne Combat Search and Rescue (CSAR) and the training center for the Israeli Paratroopers Brigade.

- Since January 2019, the so-called "Red Baron" Squadron has been operating at Tel Nof to train Israeli and German soldiers on the IAI Eitan (Heron TP) UAV. IAI (Israel Aerospace Industries) has built its own version of this UAV for the German Air Force, whose crews are now being trained by Israeli soldiers and technicians. This unit is the only non-fully Israeli squadron within the IAF.
- In November 2020, a brand-new F-35I Adir delivered from the US landed directly at Tel Nov. The specially-equipped plane will serve as a test platform at the local Flight Test Center Manat for further improvement of the F-35 in IDF service (see gallery under "Units").
- At the end of 2021, Israel ordered twelve new CH-53K King Stallion Wild transport helicopters from the US for two billion dollars, which will complement the CH-53D Sea Stallion Yas'ur at Tel Nof in the next few years. In July 2023, the 114 Squadron "Night Carriers" was temporarily closed and merged with the 118 Squadron "Night Raptors". The former will reopen in the future and accommodate the new CH-53K King Stallion as they arrive from the United States (see gallery under "Units"). Lockheed Martin-Sikorsky will also incorporate advanced Israeli systems into the new CH-53K helicopters to ensure they are optimally adapted to the requirements of the IAF. Assembly of the first CH-53K helicopter for Israel began in August 2025, and the first finished models are scheduled for delivery in 2028. Six more aircraft could be added to the 12 already ordered, since there is an option.
- The aging F-15A/B/C/D Eagle Baz fighter jets at Tel Nof will be replaced in the medium term by new F-15IA (Israel Advanced), which are based on the F-15EX Eagle II. 25 new jets for one squadron have been ordered with the option for 25 more, which will be delivered between 2031 and 2035. These new, powerful strike fighter jets would be needed to carry heavy bunker-busting bombs that could then be used against Iran's underground nuclear facilities. At the same time, at the Hatzerim Airbase 70 kilometers to the south, the 25 F-15I Ra'am jets there are being brought up to the latest F-15I+ standard through fundamental updates.
- During the Gaza War 2023/24, drones of the type IAI Eitan (Heron TP) from Tel Nof were 24 hours a day in the air over Gaza to provide the IDF with target data for its attacks against positions of Hamas. According to unofficial sources, these drones are also capable of attacking targets on the ground using guided weapons.
- In the Iranian strikes against Israel on 1 October 2024, several missiles hit the Nevatim Airbase 70 km to the south. Other main targets were the Tel Nof Airbase, the Mossad headquarters and the Glilot base of the Military Intelligence Unit 8200 both north of Tel Aviv. Independent researchers who examined satellite imagery said it had caused only limited damage.
- In June 2026, a group of ultra-Orthodox technicians began the practical phase of their training as aircraft mechanics at Tel Nof, following prior theoretical basic training at former Haifa Airbase. They will learn to maintain F-15 strike-fighters while serving in the 106 Squadron "Spearhead", with arrangements in place to allow them to largely maintain their Orthodox Jewish lifestyle. It is hoped that this will set an important precedent, encouraging more young ultra-Orthodox men to volunteer for such roles while preserving their religious identity.
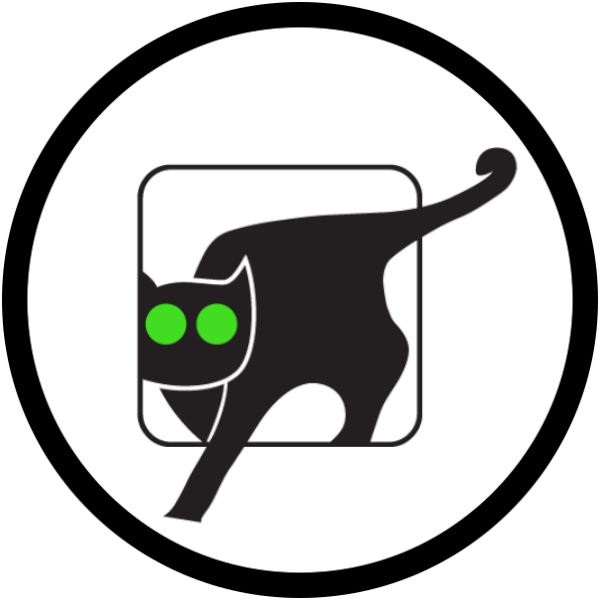
The badge of Unit 669 heliborne Combat Search and Rescue (CSAR), nicknamed "Flying Cats"

The badge of the Israeli-German "Red Baron" Squadron at Tel Nof for training on the IAI Eitan UAV

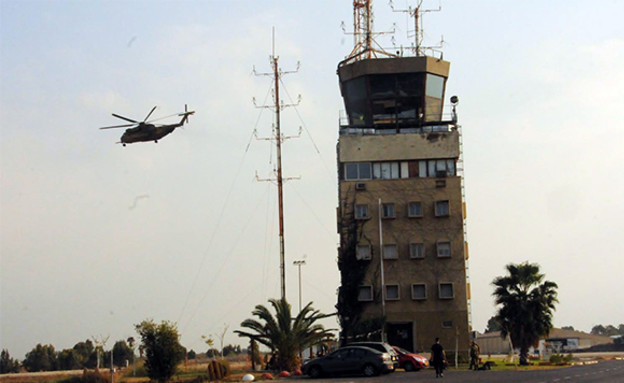
The ATC Tower at Tel Nof Airbase with a CH-53D Sea Stallion Yas'ur helicopter flying by

Aluf Omer Tischler (right) takes command of the IAF at Tel Nof in May 2026, replacing Tomer Bar (middle)

== Units ==
- 106 Squadron "Spearhead" – operating F-15C/D Eagle Baz
- 114 Squadron "Night Carriers" – temporarily closed until new CH-53K King Stallion Wild arrive from the US in 2028
- 118 Squadron "Night Raptors" – operating CH-53D Sea Stallion Yas'ur
- 133 Squadron "Knights Of The Twin Tail" – operating F-15C/D Eagle Baz
- 210 Squadron "White Eagle" – operating IAI Eitan UAVs
- 5601 Squadron "Flight Test Center" Manat – operating examples of all IAF aircraft
- Unit 555 "Sky Crows" – for Electronic Warfare (EW)
- Unit 669 "Flying Cats" – heliborne Combat Search and Rescue (CSAR) (at Palmachim also)
- Unit 888 "Refaim" – combined special operations task force
- Paratroopers Brigade Training Center
- "Red Baron" Squadron – to train Israeli and German crews on the Heron TP Eitan UAV
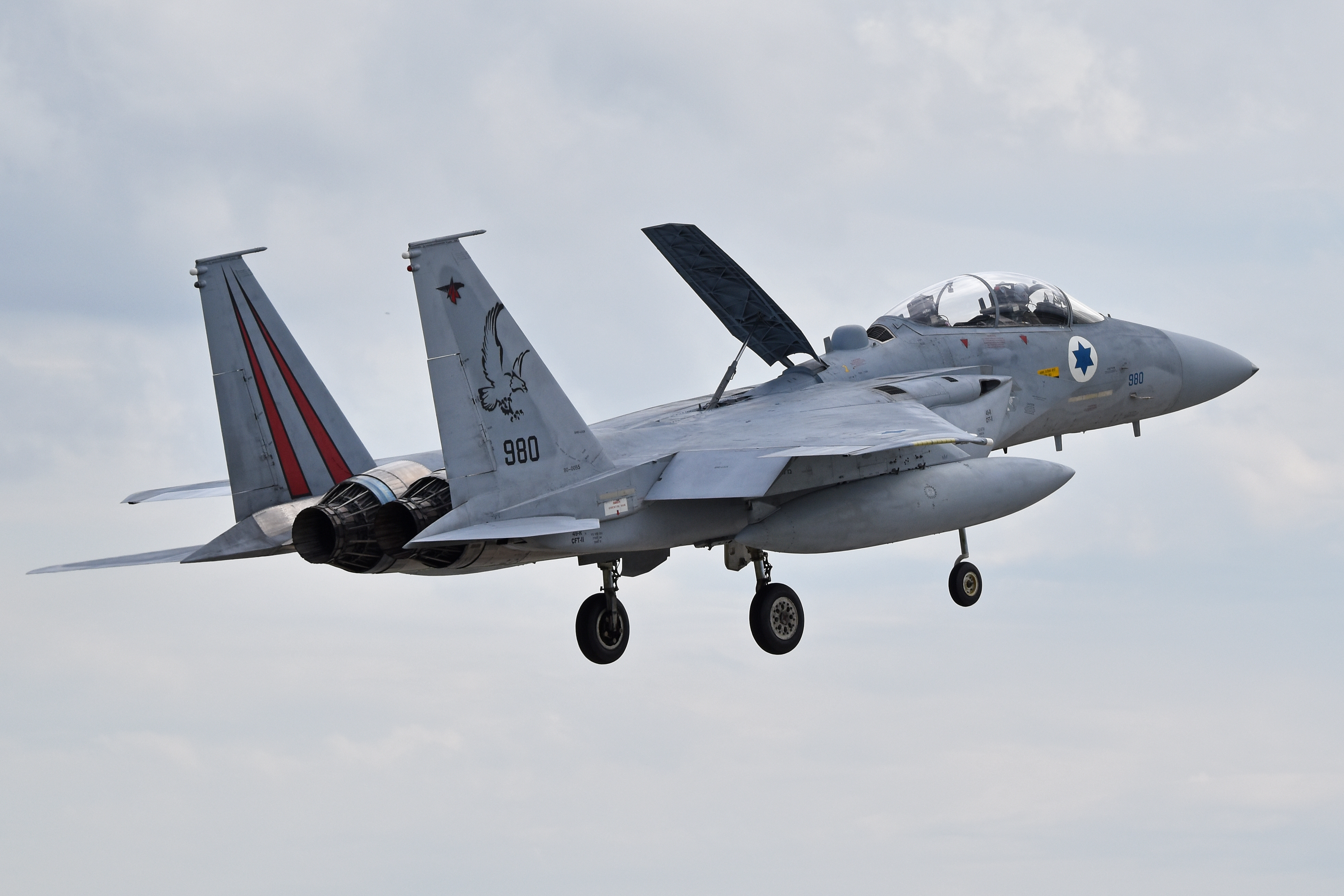
An F-15D Eagle Baz two-seater of 106 Squadron "Spearhead" about to land at Tel Nof

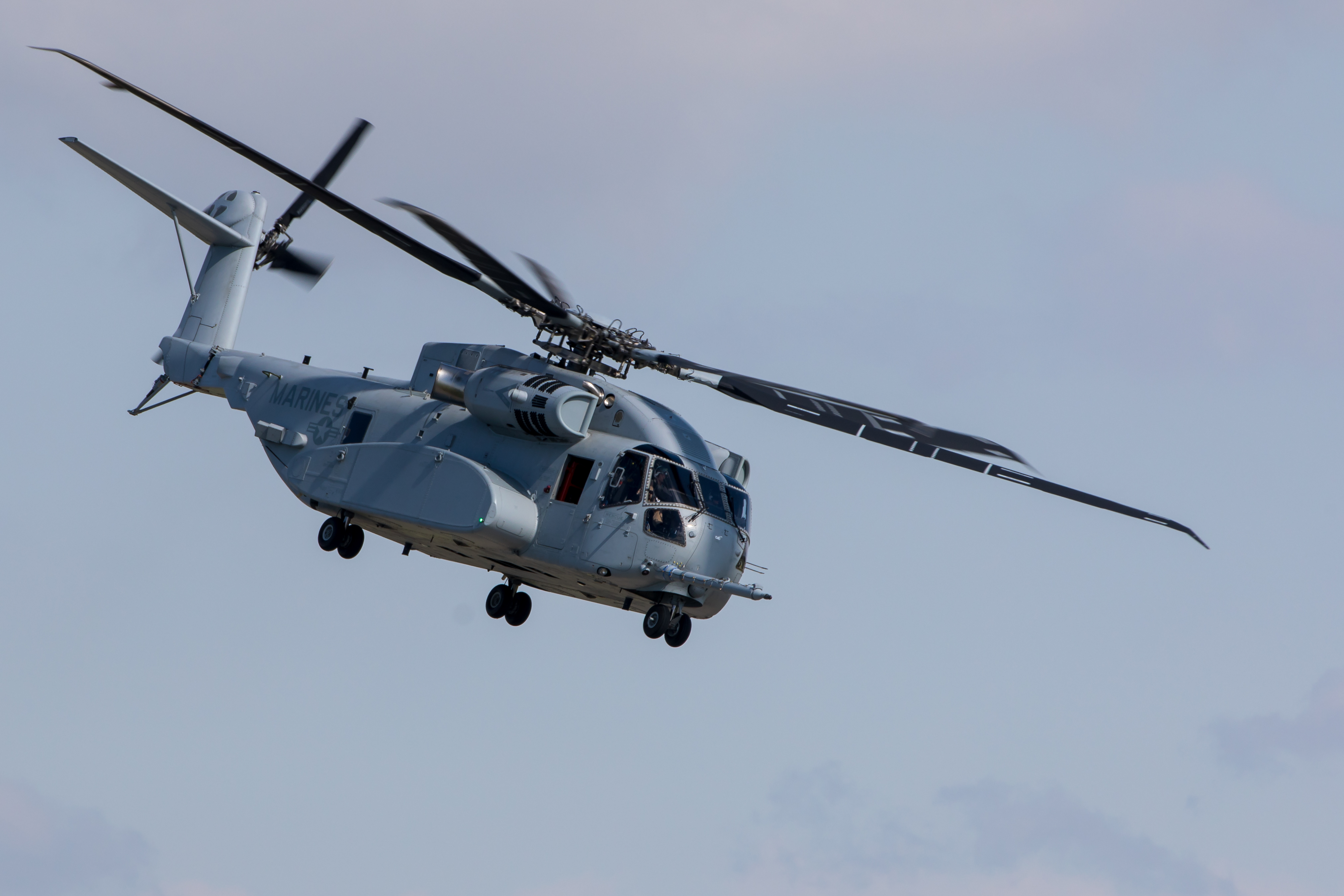
New CH-53K King Stallion Wild will be based on Tel Nof in 114 Squadron "Night Carriers" from 2028

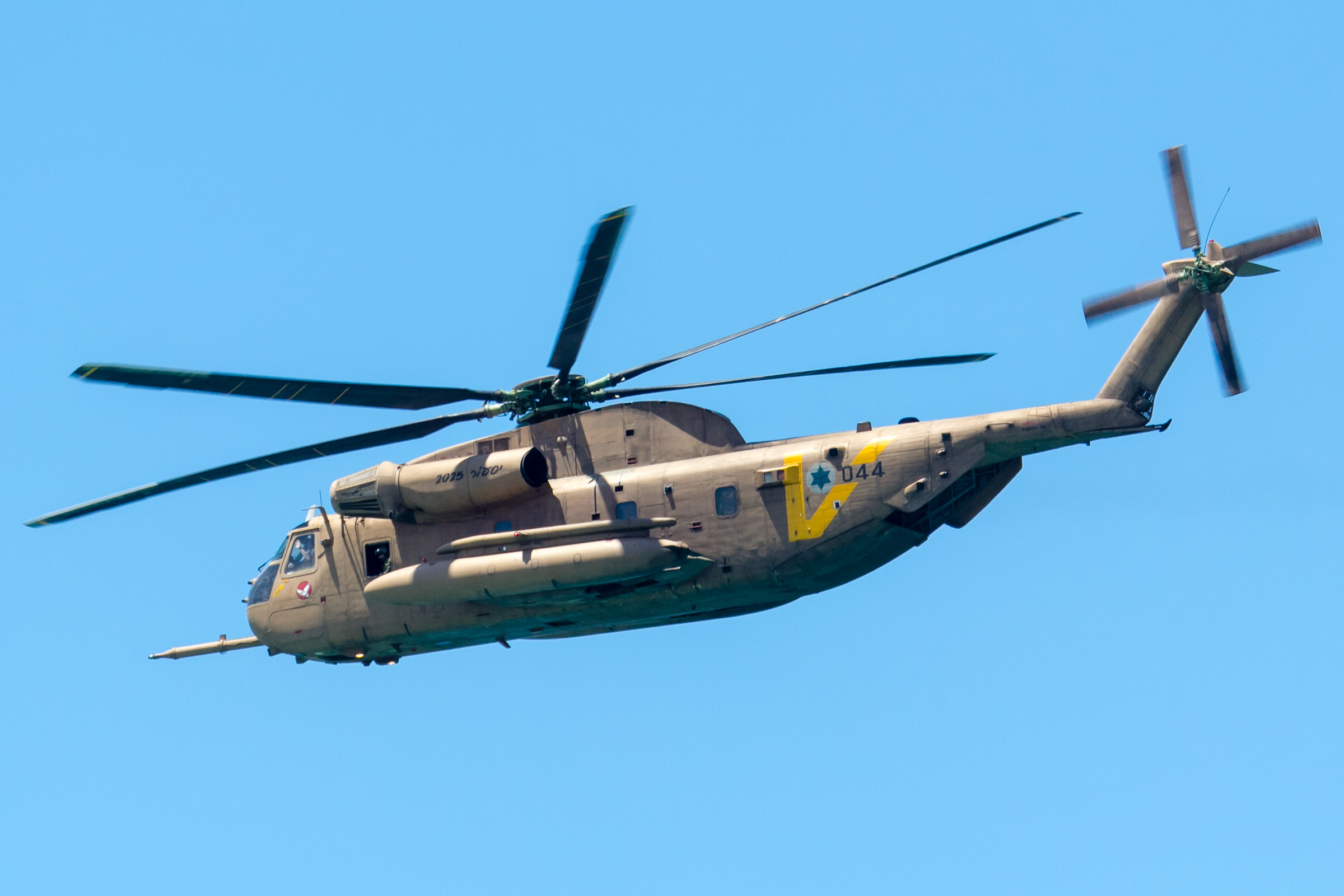
A CH-53D Sea Stallion Yas'ur of 118 Squadron "Night Raptors" from Tel Nof

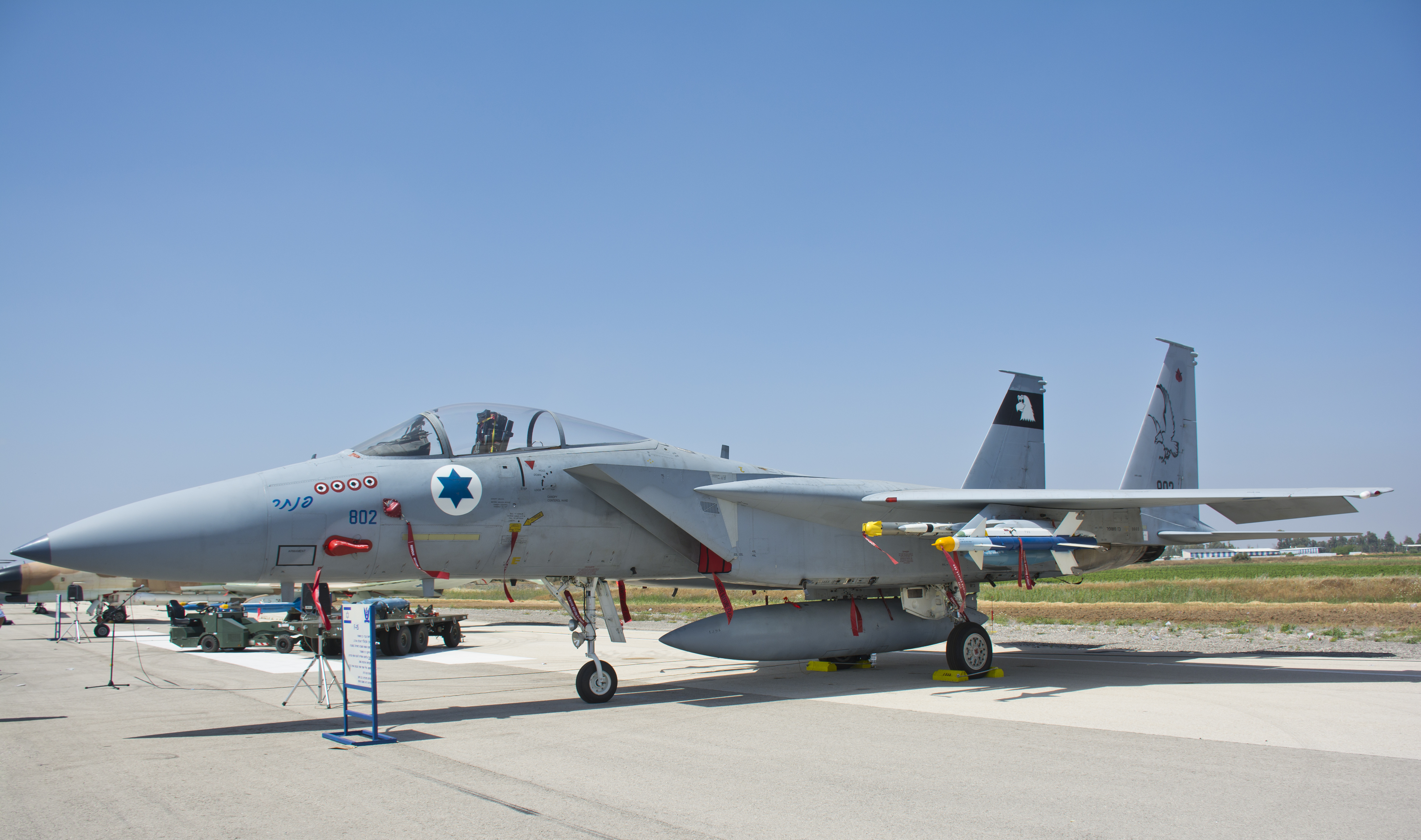
A single-seat F-15C Eagle Baz of 133 Squadron "Knights Of The Twin Tail" with four Syrian "Kill Marks"

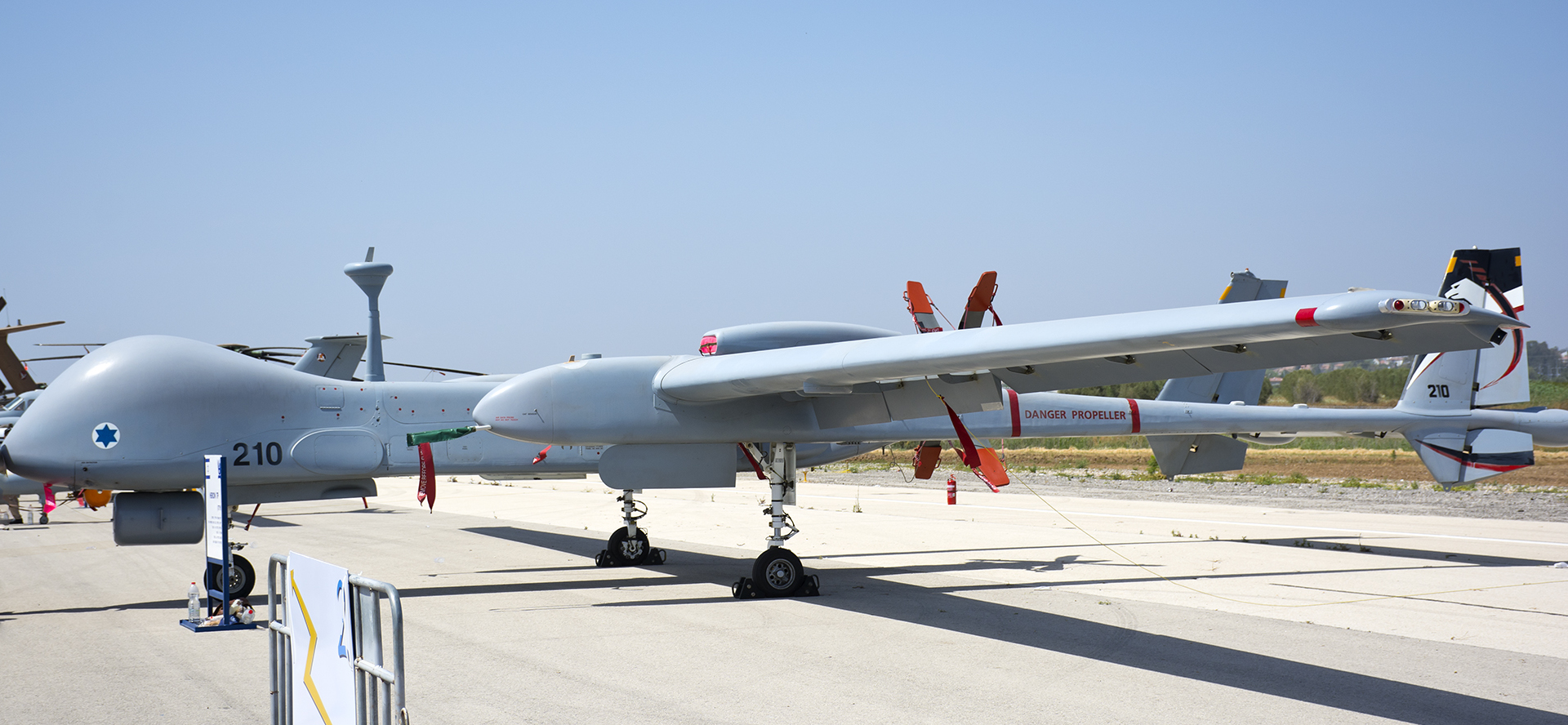
An IAI Eitan UAV of 210 Squadron "White Eagle" (see tail) from Tel Nof

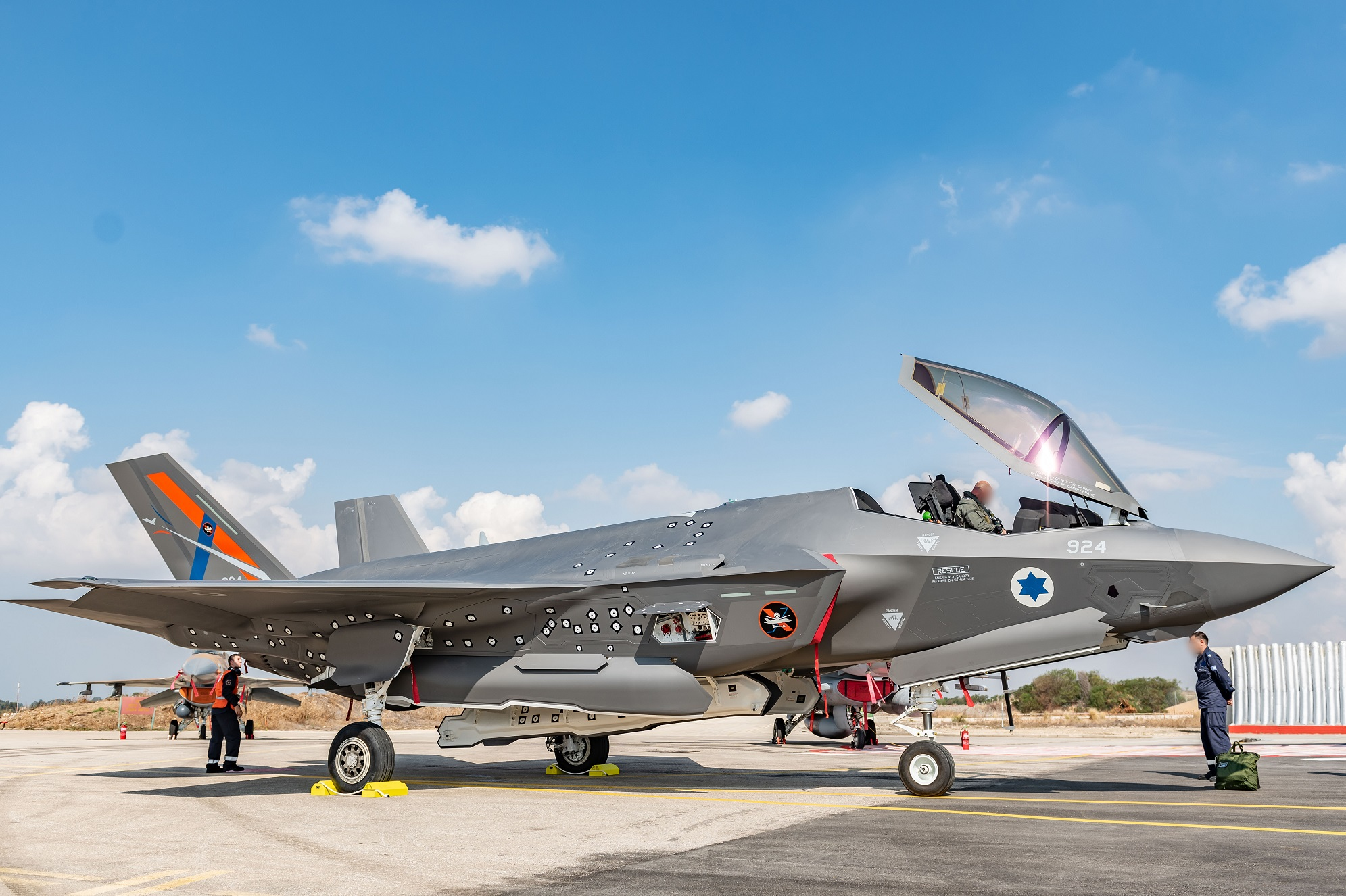
The Tel Nof Flight Test Center Manat gets a special F-35I Adir in 2020

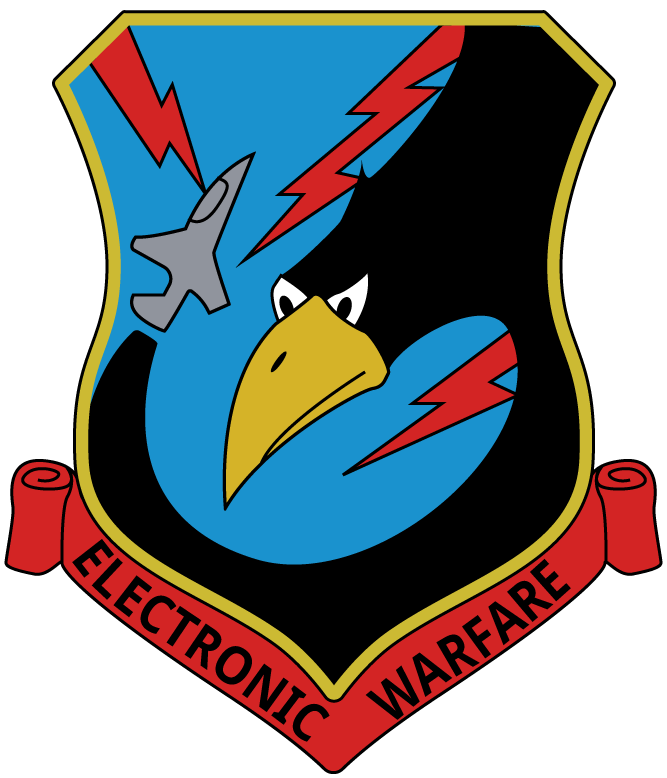
Shoulder patch of Unit 555 "Sky Crows" for Electronic Warfare (EW) at Tel Nof

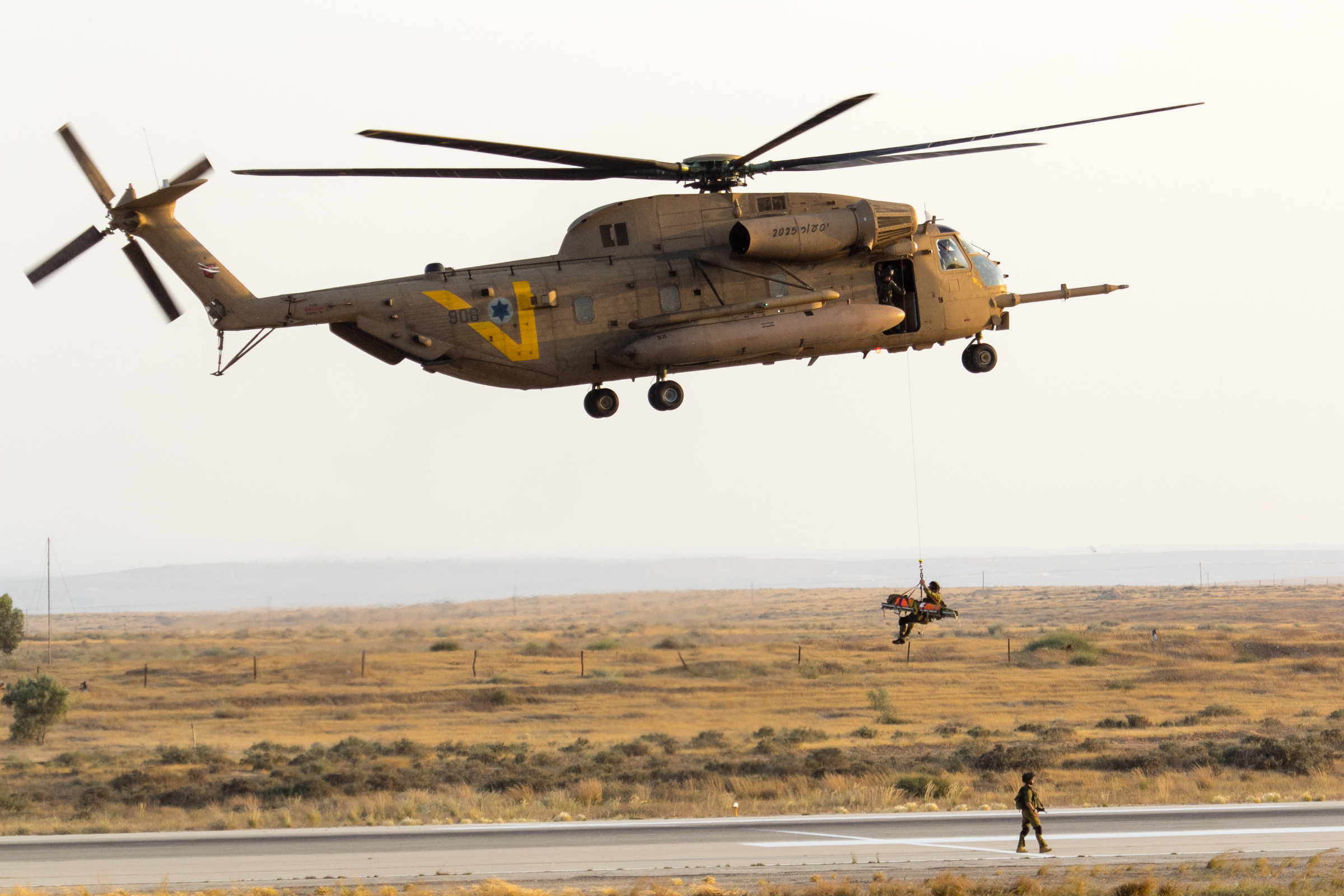
The Unit 669 trains the rescue of people with a CH-53D Sea Stallion Yas'ur from Tel Nof

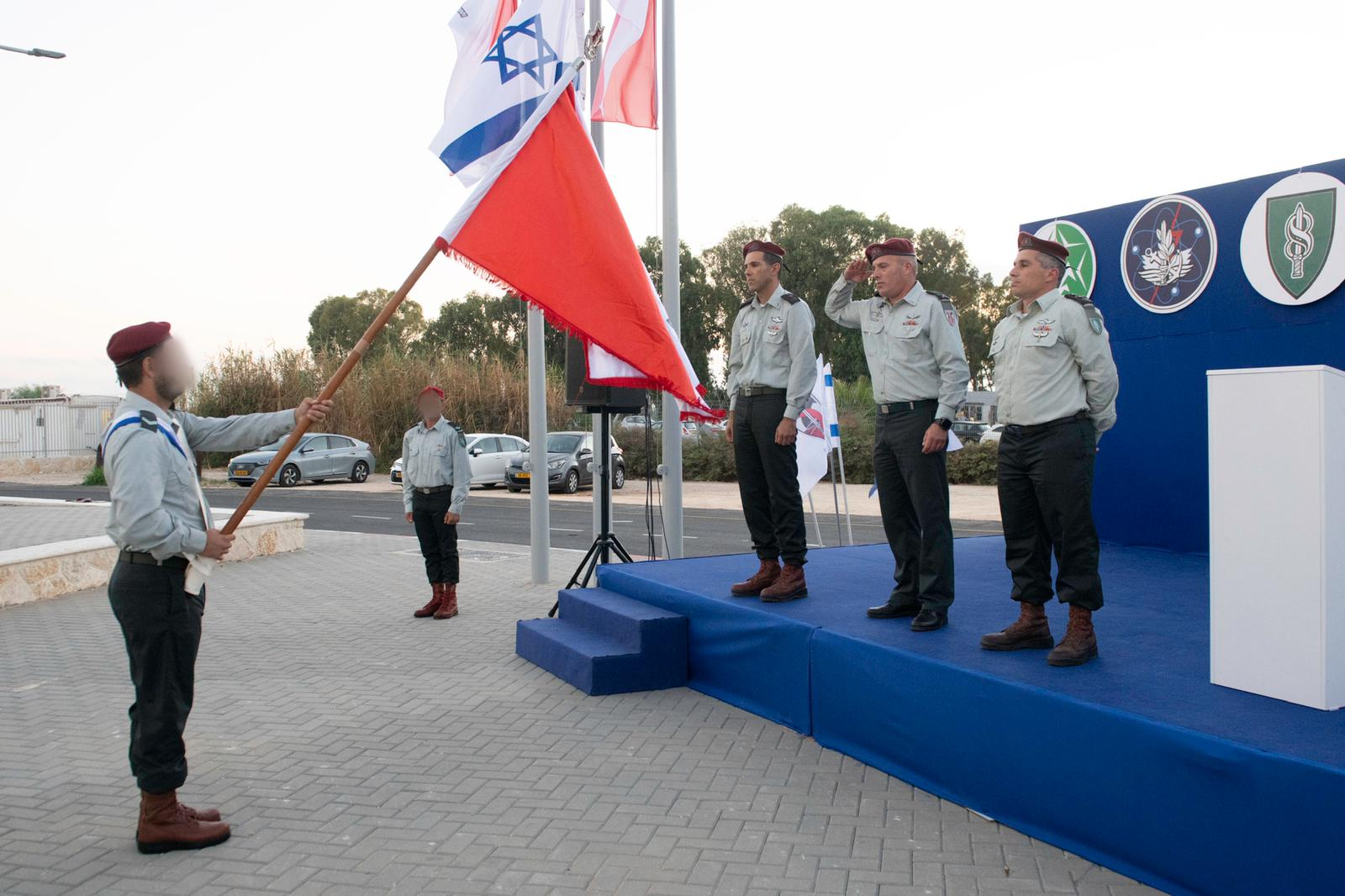
Change of command of the multidimensional Unit 888 "Refaim" in July 2021 at Tel Nof

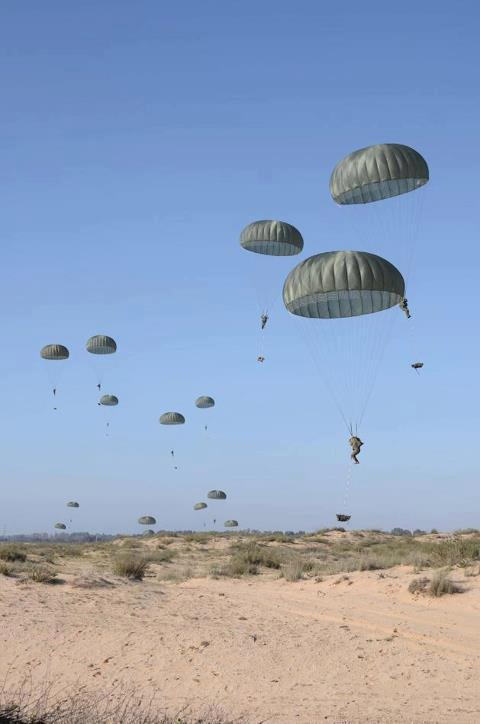
Paratroopers rain down over southern Israel in March 2012

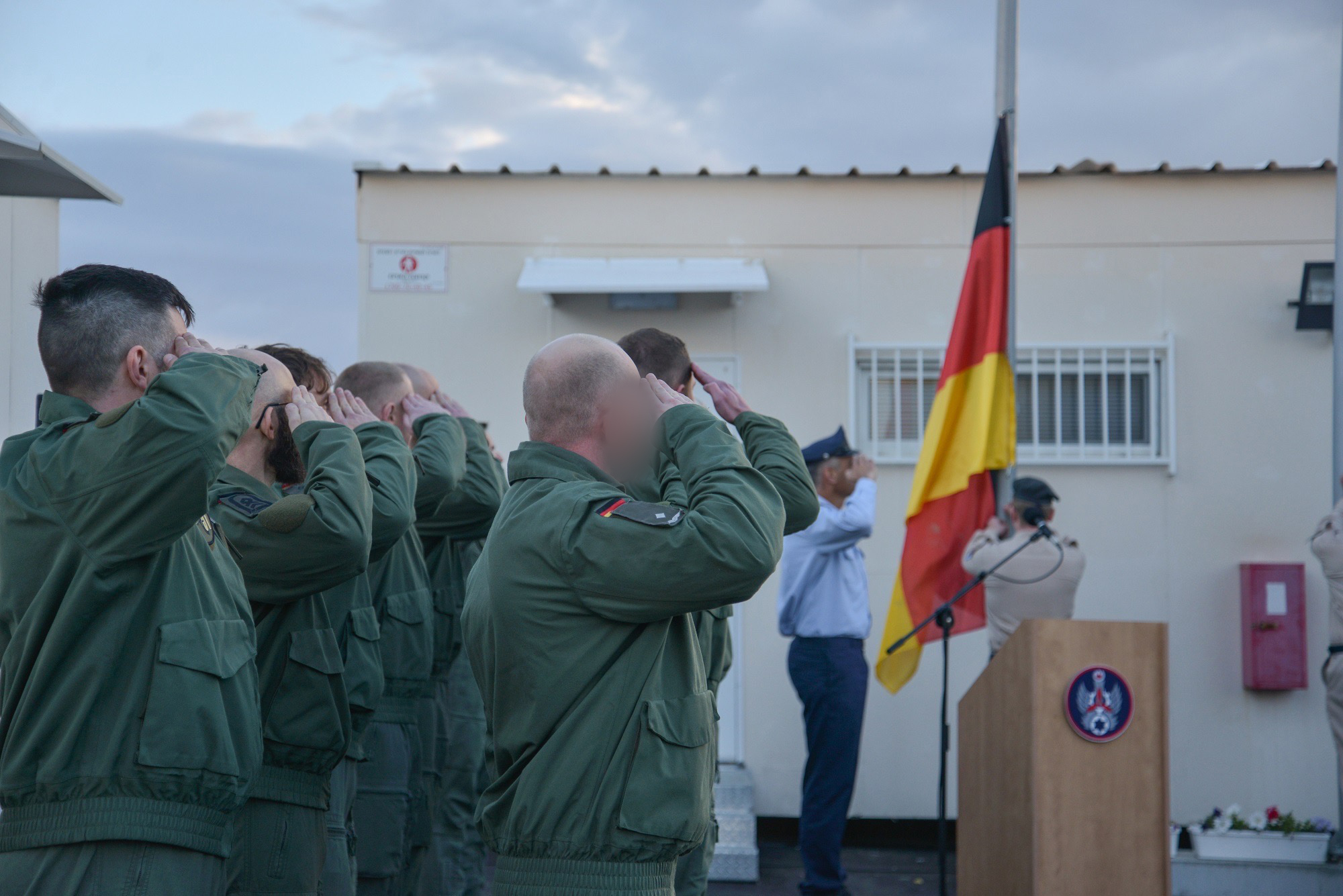
The Israeli-German "Red Baron" Squadron for UAV training at Tel Nof was inaugurated in January 2019

Note: IAF aircraft can usually be assigned to their squadron by the symbols on the tail

== Accidents ==
- On 4 July 1948, engine No. 1 (left) of a Curtiss C-46 Commando of the Israeli Air Force (aircraft registration RX-133) caught fire during start-up at what would later become the Tel Nof Airbase. Apparently, fuel had leaked onto the left wing during the refueling process with a manual fuel pump. The fire was extinguished, but the aircraft suffered significant damage to the left side of the fuselage, leaving it irreparably damaged. No one was injured. See also picture of an Israeli C-46 Commando above under First cargo aircraft.

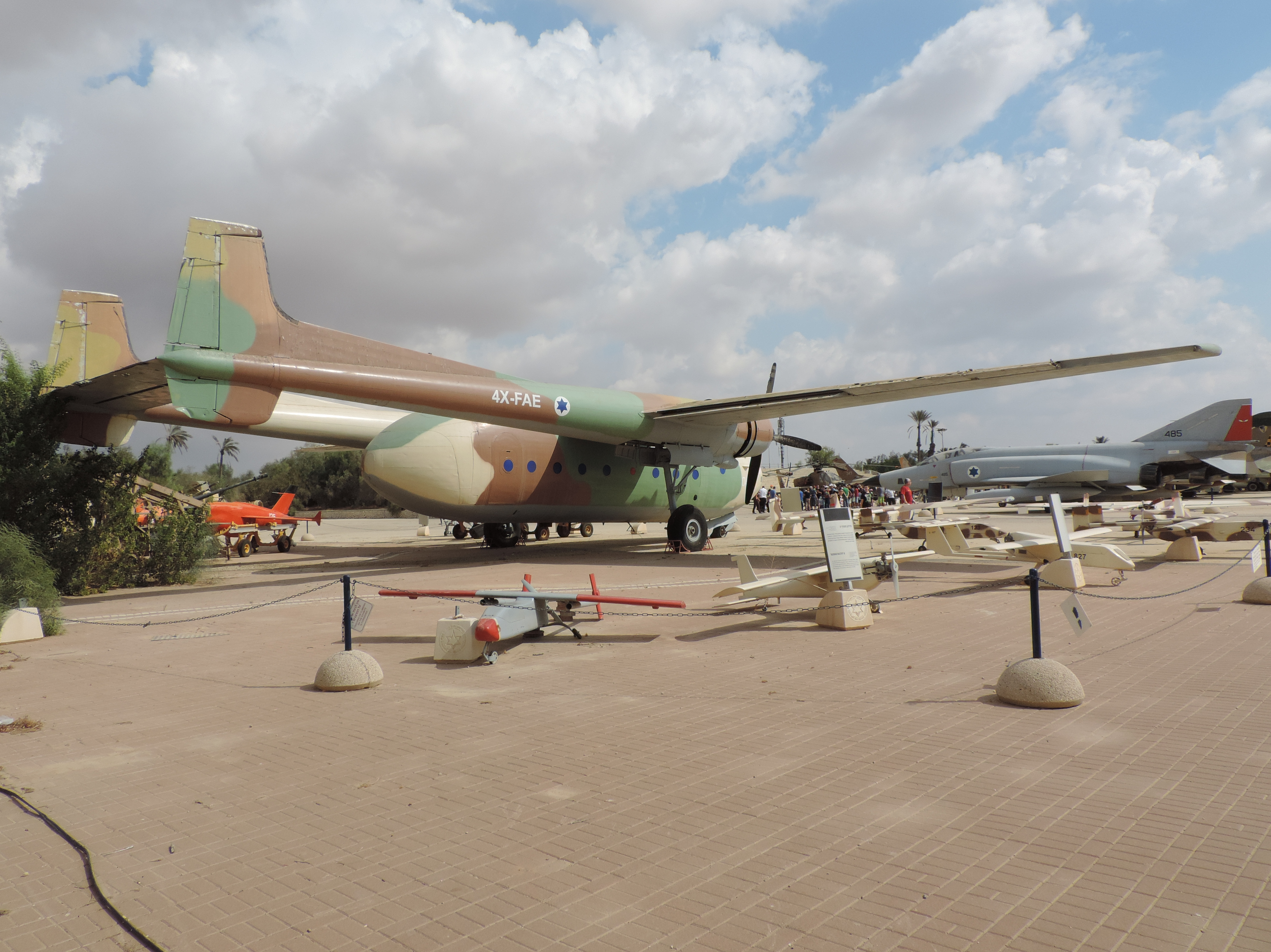
An identical Nord Noratlas 2501D at the Israeli Air Force Museum

- On 29 April 1964, a Nord Noratlas 2501D of 103 Squadron "Elephants" from Tel Nof (aircraft registration 4X-FAD/044) was flown into a mountain near Ramon Airbase. In this CFIT (Controlled flight into terrain), all 9 occupants were killed, the two pilots and the 7 passengers. It was the former GC+231 of the German Air Force (Deutsche Luftwaffe). See also pictures of an identical Nord Noratlas above under Yom Kippur War and to the right.
- On 19 April 1974, two CH-53 helicopters from Tel Nof collided over the Rosh Pina Airport in northern Israel. One of the two helicopters was able to land safely, while the other crashed and burst into flames. All eight IDF soldiers on board died. The IAF determined that the cause was human error on the part of one of the pilots, although several helicopters were landing at the same time and the air traffic controller was obviously overwhelmed.
- On 10 May 1977, a CH-53 helicopter from Tel Nof crashed during a night training exercise in the Jordan Valley, killing all 54 people on board (including the 10-man crew), making it the worst single-aircraft crash in Israel. The crash site was in the West Bank, about 5 kilometers north of Jericho in a wadi. The cause was determined to be flying at too low an altitude during the dark, which caused the helicopter to strike a hill, crash and explode (CFIT, Controlled flight into terrain).

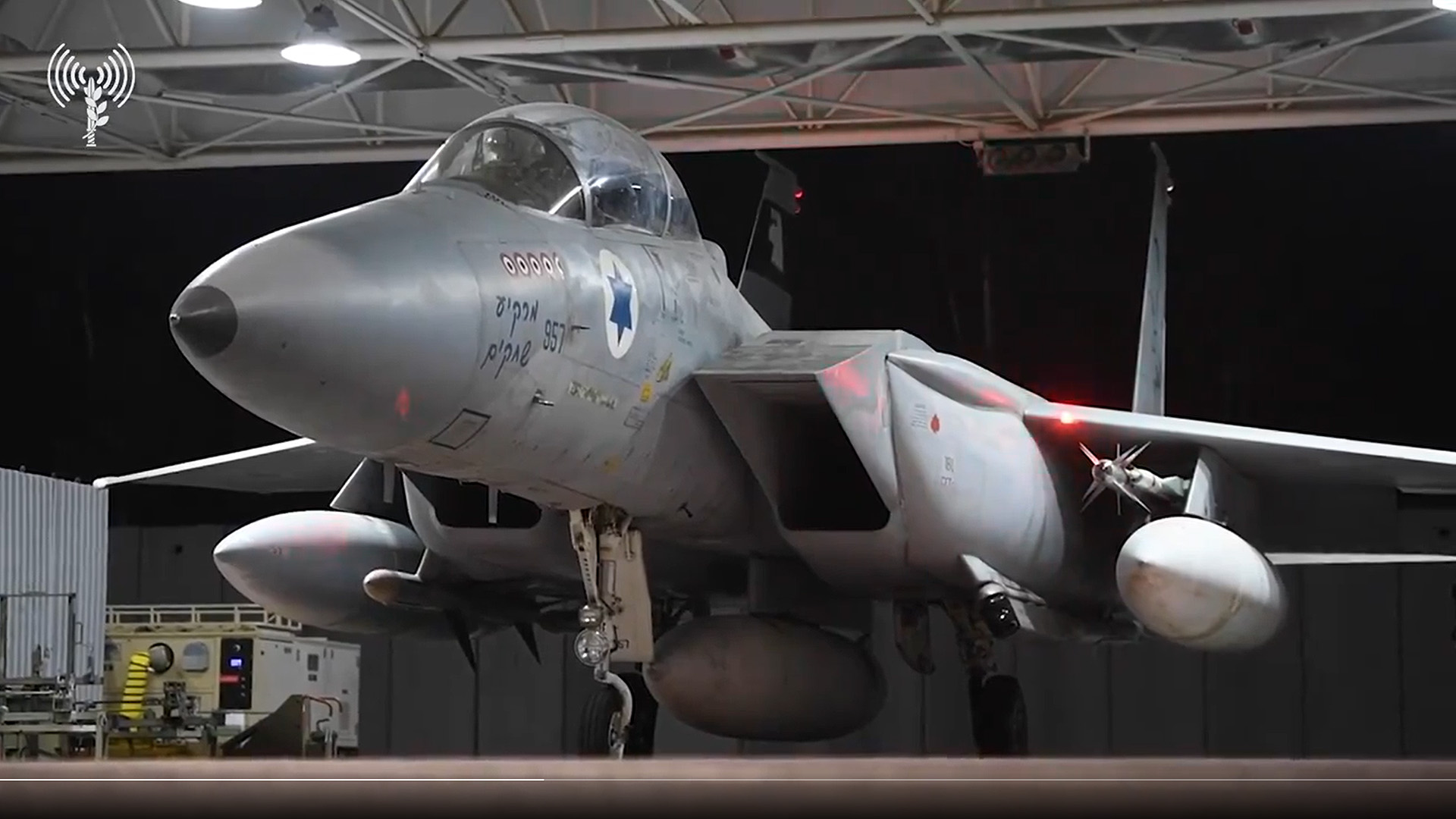
The F-15D Eagle Baz #957 before the Israeli attack on Iran during the night of 25-26 October 2024

- In May 1983, an F-15D Eagle Baz #957 from Tel Nov and an A-4 Skyhawk Ayit collided in mid-air during an exercise over the Negev desert in southern Israel. While the A-4 pilot ejected, the two-seat F-15D managed to land safely at nearby Ramon Airbase, despite having its right wing almost completely torn off in the collision. This was only possible because the F-15 pilot turned on the afterburners, compensating for the lack of lift. The landing took place at about twice the normal speed, and the jet only came to a stop shortly before the end of the runway. The aircraft manufacturer McDonnell Douglas was so impressed by what was happening that it sent over a new right wing free of charge. The aircraft with the number 957 was repaired and put back into service. More than 41 years later it took part in the October 2024 Israeli strikes on Iran (see photo on the right).
- Between 1979 and 1998, the IAF lost a total of eight F-15 jets and nine pilots/navigators in accidents during routine flight and combat training. All of these aircraft were based at Tel Nof. No such machine was lost in aerial combat or due to enemy air defenses.
- On 4 February 1997, two CH-53 Sea Stallion Ya'sur helicopters of 118 Squadron "Night Raptors" from Tel Nof collided in the evening hours over northern Israel while they were carrying soldiers into the Israeli security zone in Southern Lebanon. Both planes crashed, killing all 73 people on board - all male military personnel. The two crash sites were located in the moshav She'ar Yashuv (Today's memorial: 33°13′23″N 35°38′28″E) and in an open field near the kibbutz Dafna. The crash, which represents the worst Israeli aviation disaster to date, sparked nationwide mourning and is considered one of the main reasons for Israel's decision to withdraw from Southern Lebanon in 2000. The cause of the accident is believed to be that the two helicopter pilots lost visual contact and orientation with each other as they flew towards the border of Lebanon in the dark with their lights switched off as required.
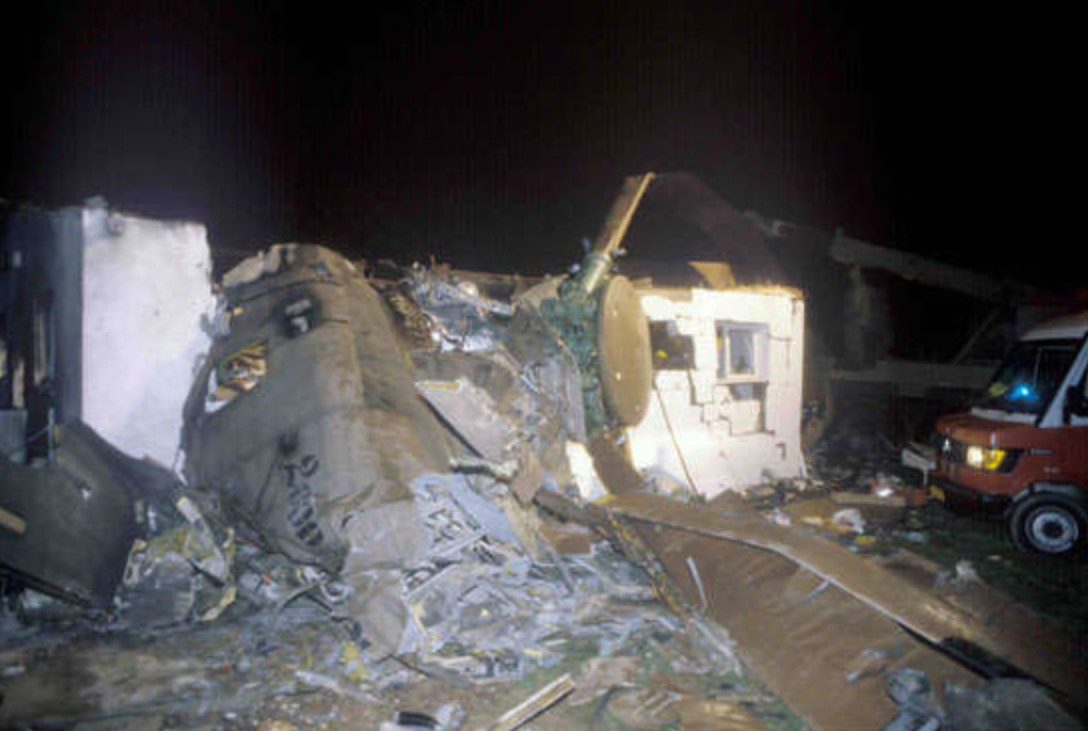
Remains of one of the two crashed CH-53 helicopters at She'ar Yashuv

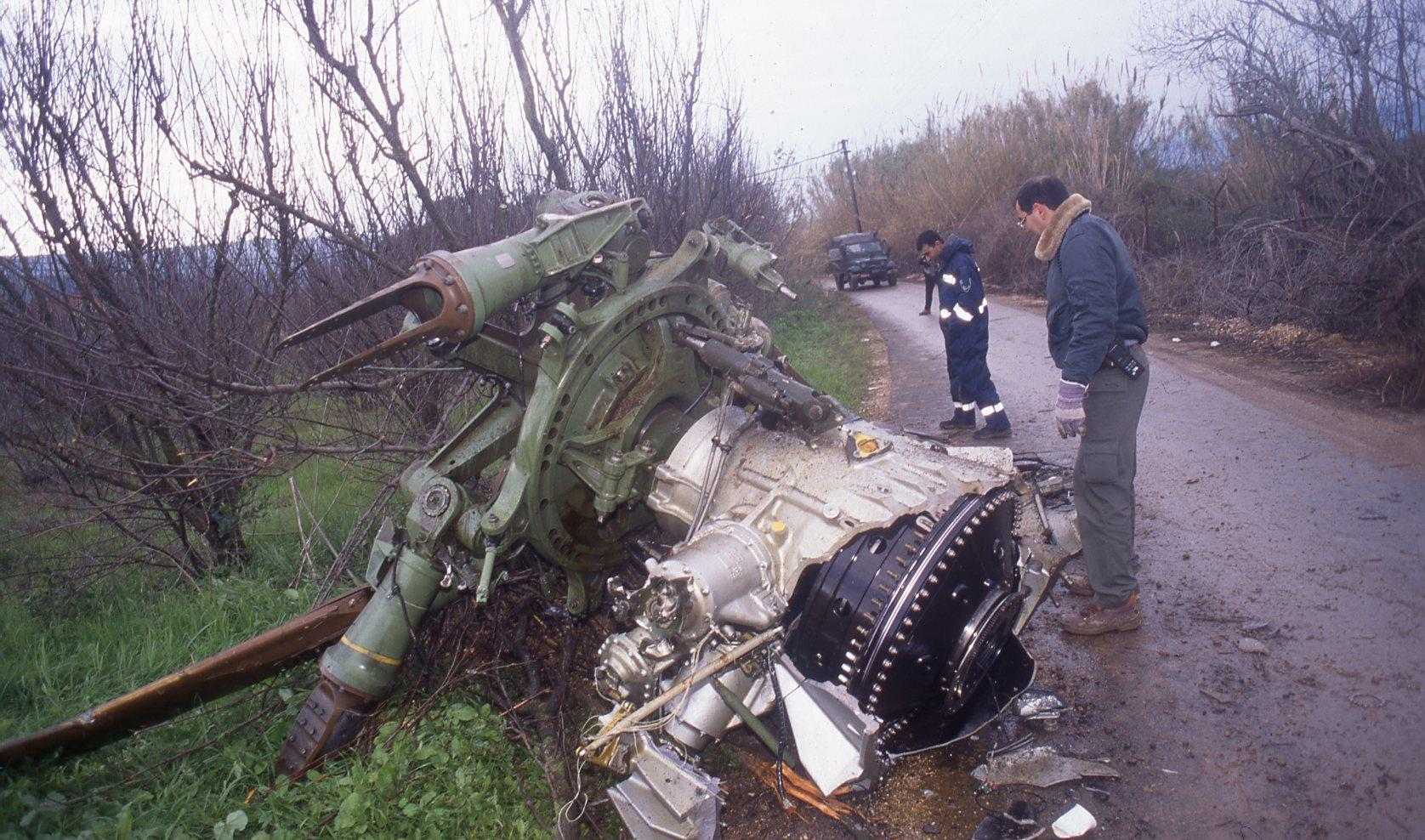
Debris of the second crashed CH-53 helicopter near Dafna

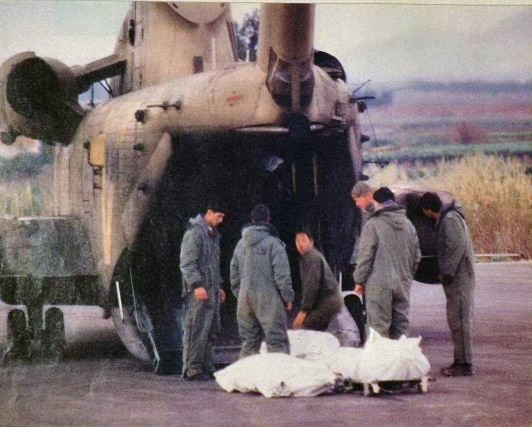
Rescue and transport of victims of the two helicopter crashes

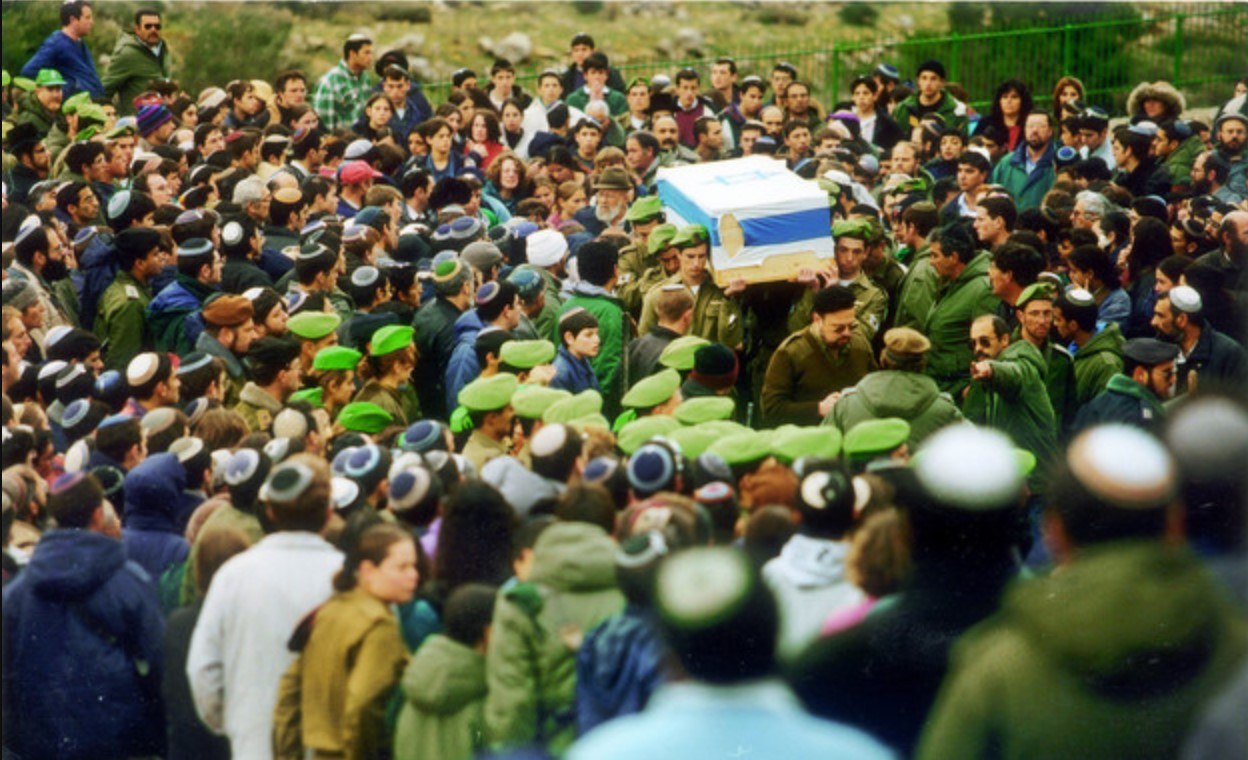
Funeral of one of the victims with great sympathy

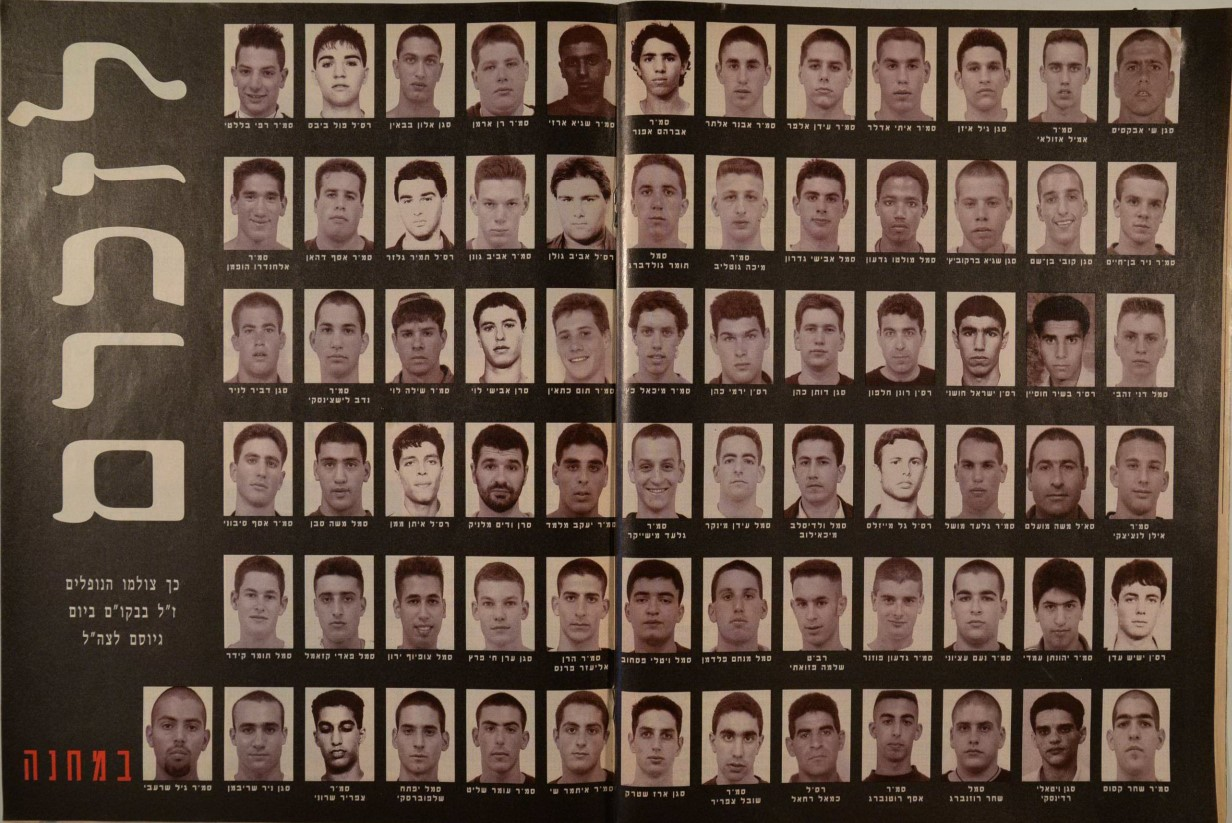
Portrait photos of all 73 victims of the accident

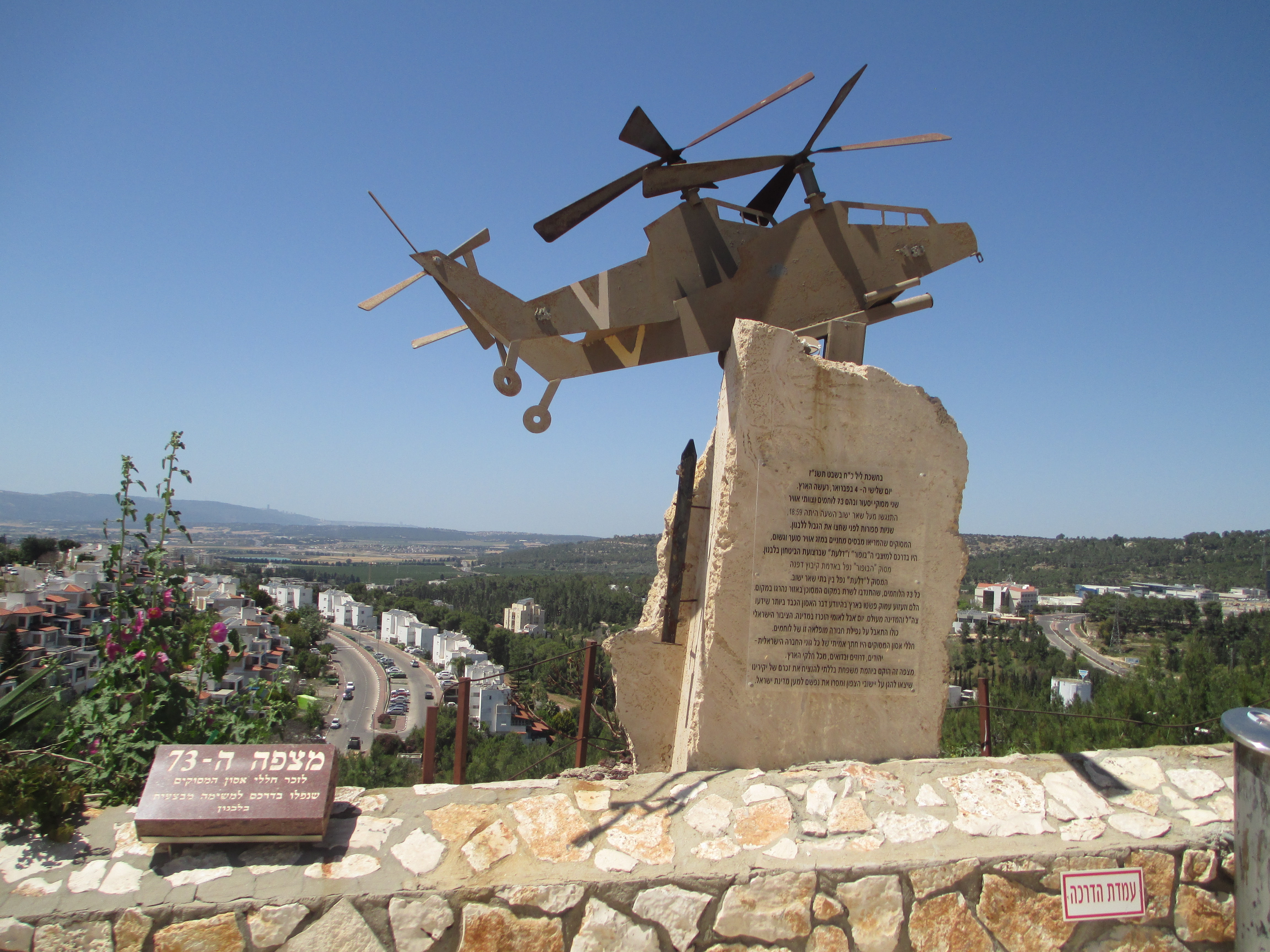
Memorial in Migdal HaEmek, 32°40′46″N 35°15′04″E

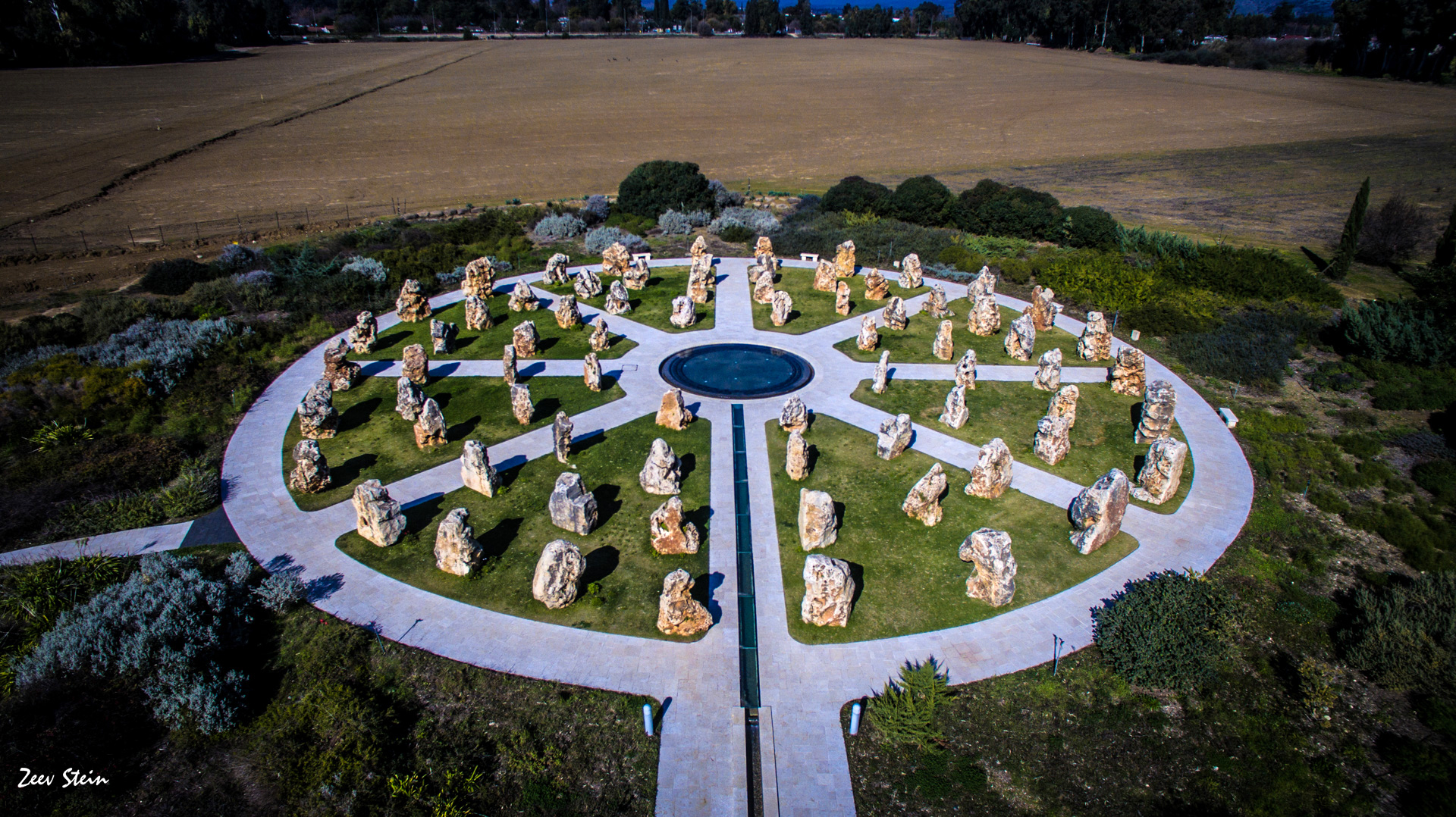
Memorial in She'ar Yashuv, 33°13′23″N 35°38′28″E

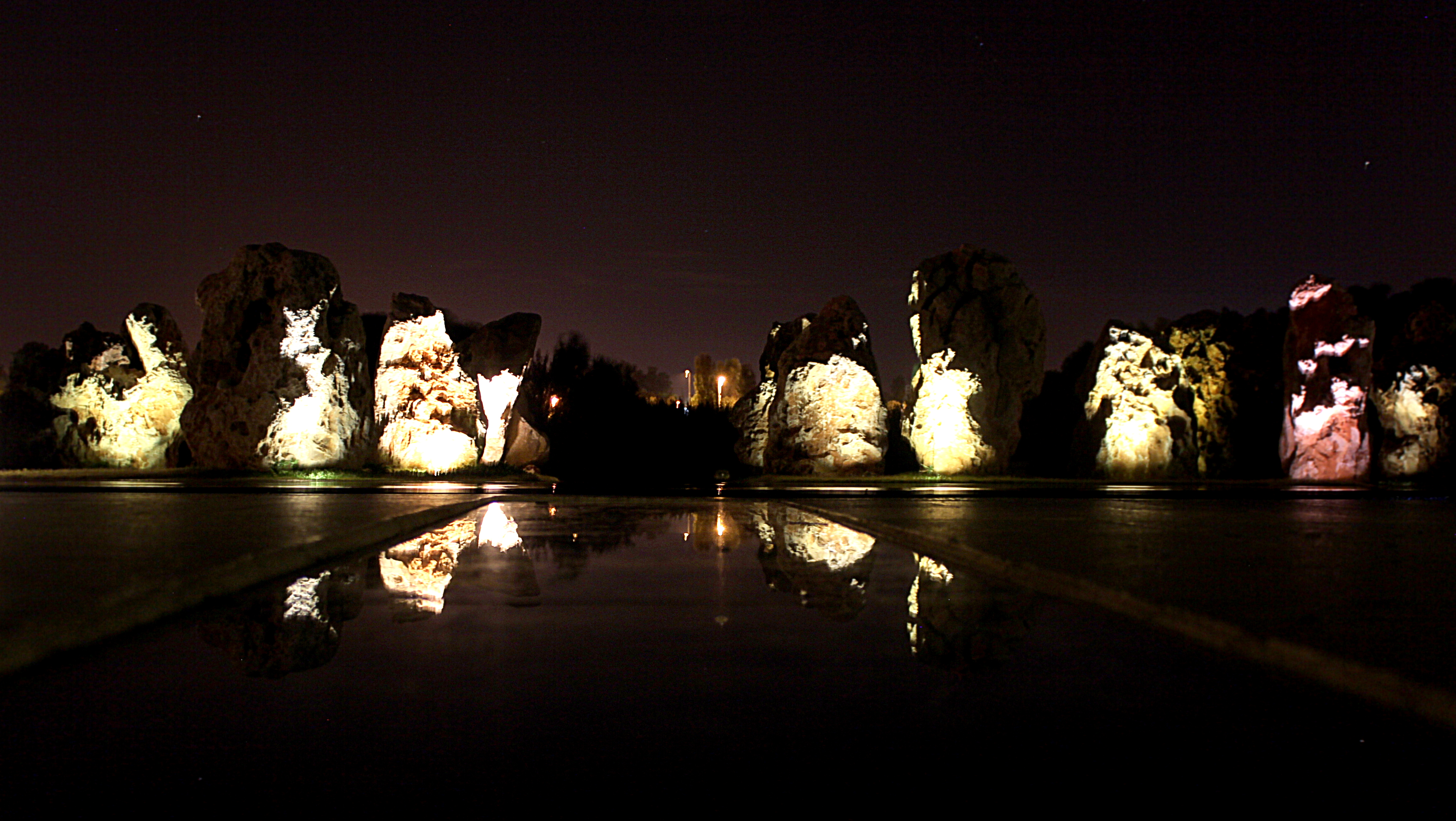
Memorial at night

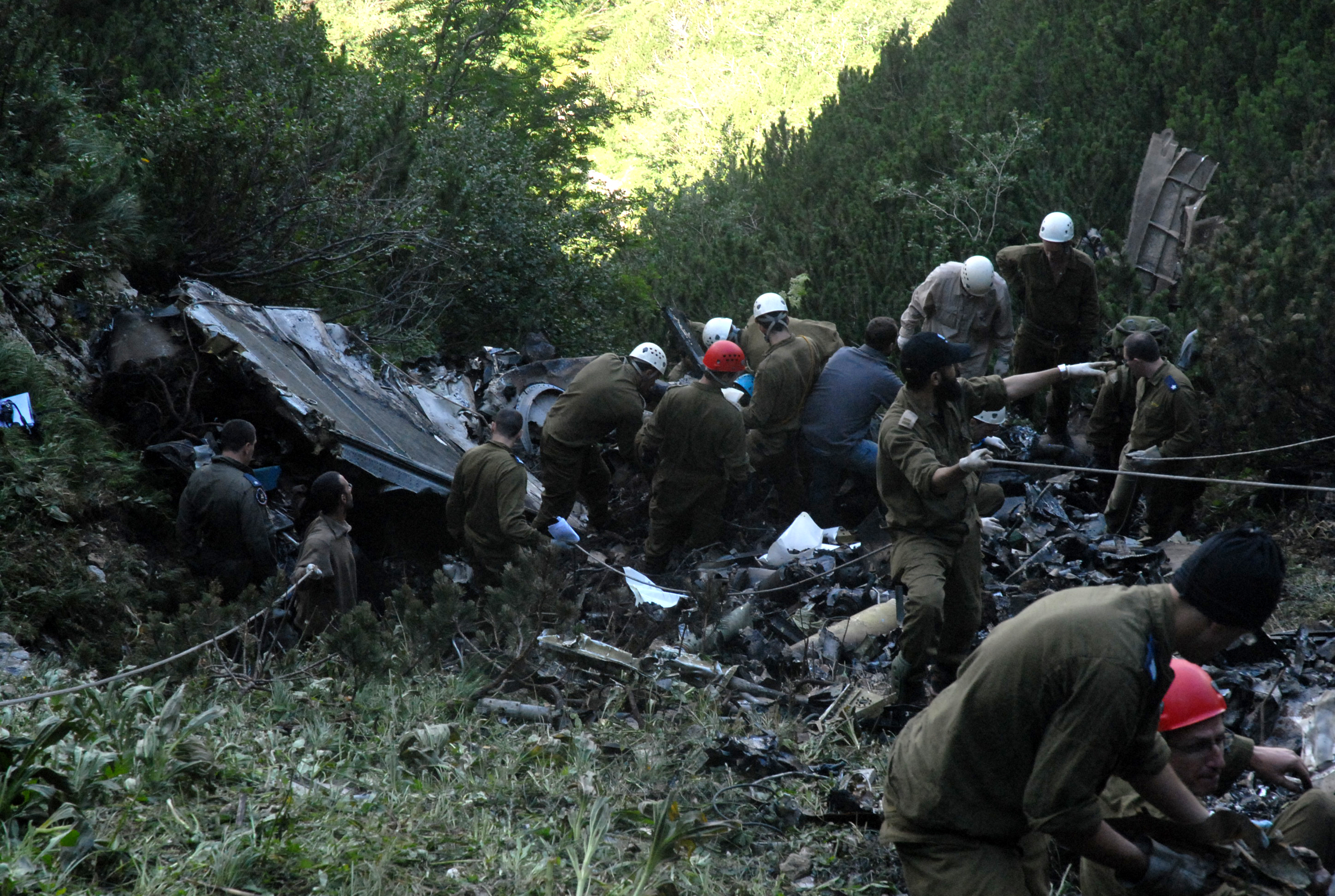
The crash site in Romania

- On 26 July 2010, a CH-53 helicopter of 118 Squadron from Tel Nof crashed near the town of Brașov in Romania during a Romanian-Israeli military exercise in the Carpathian Mountains. All seven passengers died: four Israeli pilots, two Israeli mechanics and a Romanian liaison officer. An investigation determined that the crash was most likely due to human error.

== See also ==
- Israeli Air Force
- List of former Royal Air Force stations
- Nuclear weapons of Israel
