= 118 Squadron (Israel) =

Israeli military unit

- טייסת דורסי הלילה
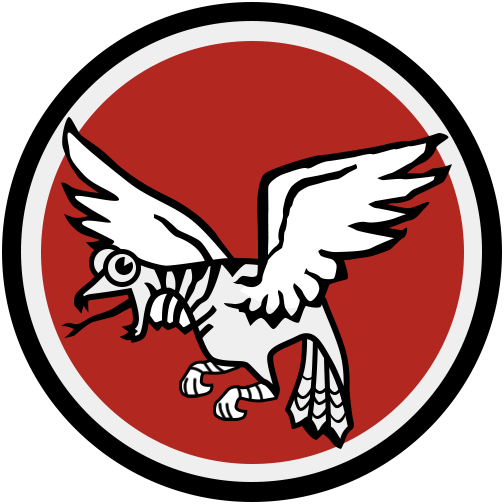
- Active: October 6, 1970 – present
- Country: Israel
- Branch: Israeli Air Force
- Type: Heavy Transport
- Role: Heavy-lift, assault transport, search and rescue
- Size: Squadron
- Part of: Participation & Helicopter Group
- Garrison/HQ: Tel Nof Airbase
- Nicknames: "Night Raptors" "Night Birds" "Nocturnal Birds of Pray" (Hebrew: דורסי הלילה, Dorsei HaLyla)
- Mascot: Petrel
- Equipment: CH-53-2025 Yas'ur
- Engagements: Yom Kippur War; Third Battle of Mount Hermon; Israeli–Lebanese conflict; 1982 Lebanon War; South Lebanon conflict; 2006 Lebanon War; Operation Sharp and Smooth; Gaza–Israel conflict; Operation Cast Lead; Operation Pillar of Defense; 2014 Gaza War; Gaza war

Commanders
- Current commander: Lieutenant Colonel Igal
- Notable commanders: Nechamya Dagan; Yuval Efrat; Shaul Shefi; Menachem Arad; Moti Regev; Dani Manor; Shmuel Araz; Shmuel Eldar; Ofer Ziv; Shlomo Maciach; Amiram Levi; Gabriel Shor; Tzvi Tesler; David Berki; Avo Rot; Shay Katav; Yoav Amiram; Ofer Balin; Lt Col Gadi; Lt Col Ariel Dayan

Insignia
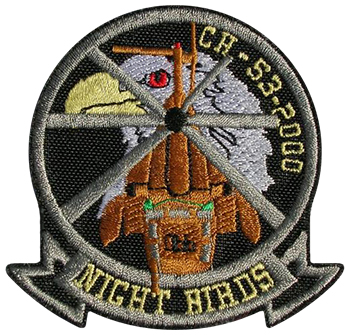
- Formation Symbol

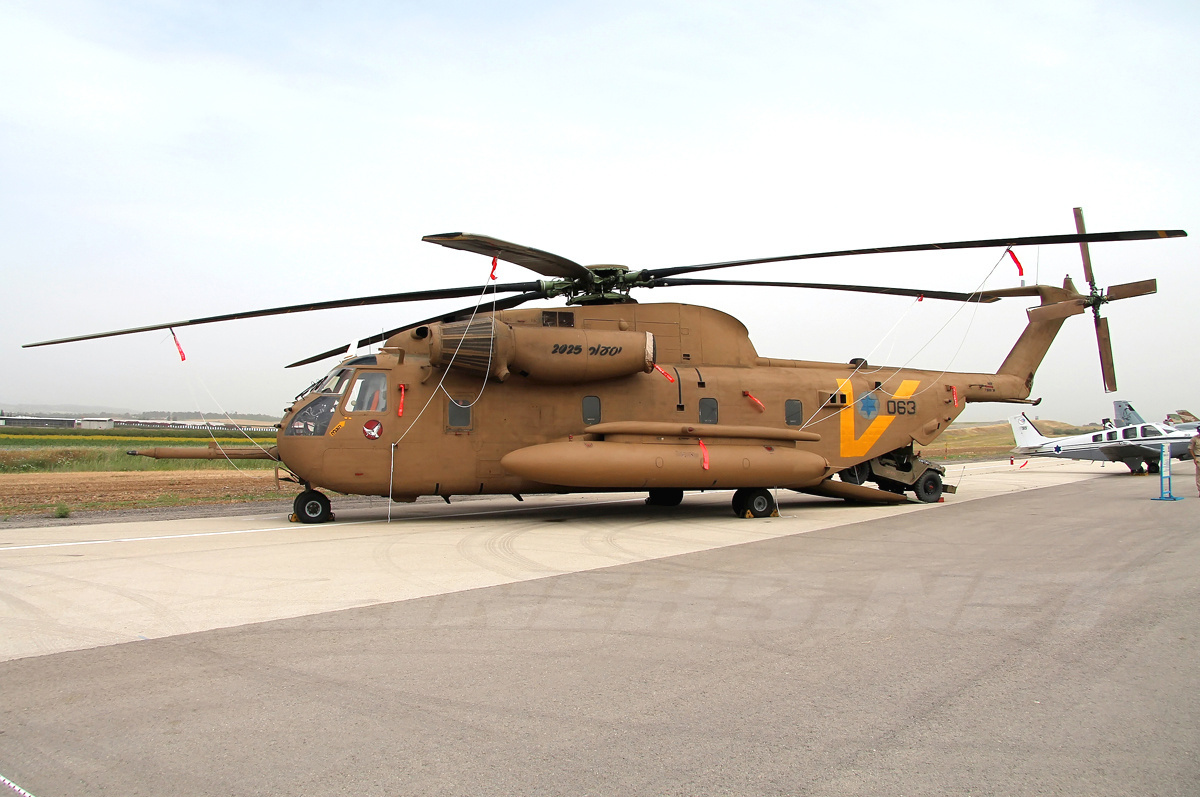
CH-53-2025 Yas'ur of the 118 Squadron at Tel Nof AFB

The 118 Squadron is an active helicopter squadron of the Israeli Air Force and is part of the Participation & Helicopter Group, based at Tel Nof Airbase. Established in October 1970 and nicknamed the "Night Birds", also known as the "Night Raptors" and the "Nocturnal Birds of Pray", the squadron is operating the Sikorsky CH-53-2025 Yas'ur.

In 1969, the IAF acquired new and used CH-53s to supplement the already existing heavy-lift fleet of the French Aérospatiale SA 321 Super Frelon within 114 Squadron. In the following year, as more CH-53s arrived in Israel, it was deemed necessary to separate both the CH-53 and Super Frelon departments from 114 Squadron. Thus, the IAF established 118 Squadron which, at the time, was the first independent CH-53 squadron and 114 Squadron kept operating both fleets until the retirement of the Super Frelons in 1991.

Since its establishment, the squadron has seen extensive action since the Yom Kippur War, and in between engagements it also conducts countless search and rescue missions for both military personnel and civilians in need of evacuating to hospitals, while working closely with Unit 669.

As of July 2023, 118 Squadron is the sole heavy-lift helicopter squadron of the IAF, after 114 Squadron was merged into the former and temporarily deactivated to make preparations for the newer Sikorsky CH-53K King Stallion helicopters, which are planned to arrive in Israel sometime in 2026.

== History ==
=== Early years ===
The 118 Squadron was established after the War of Attrition on October 6, 1970 at Tel Nof Airbase and acquired its first CH-53 Yas'ur helicopters from the Yas'ur department of 114 Squadron. Since then, the squadron has been engaged in all Israeli wars and conflicts, as well as in countless search and rescue operations.

=== Yom Kippur War ===
The 118 Squadron's baptism of fire occurred during the 1973 Yom Kippur War, more specifically in the Third Battle of Mount Hermon (codenamed Operation Dessert) when the entire squadron (15 helicopters) was transporting two reserve airborne battalions (626 paratroopers) of the 317th Regiment (226th Regiment today) in an attempt to recapture Mount Hermon from Syrian control. The squadron lost two Yasu'rs during the war; one was shot down and the other broke mid-air due to mechanical problems, with a total of seven aircrew killed.

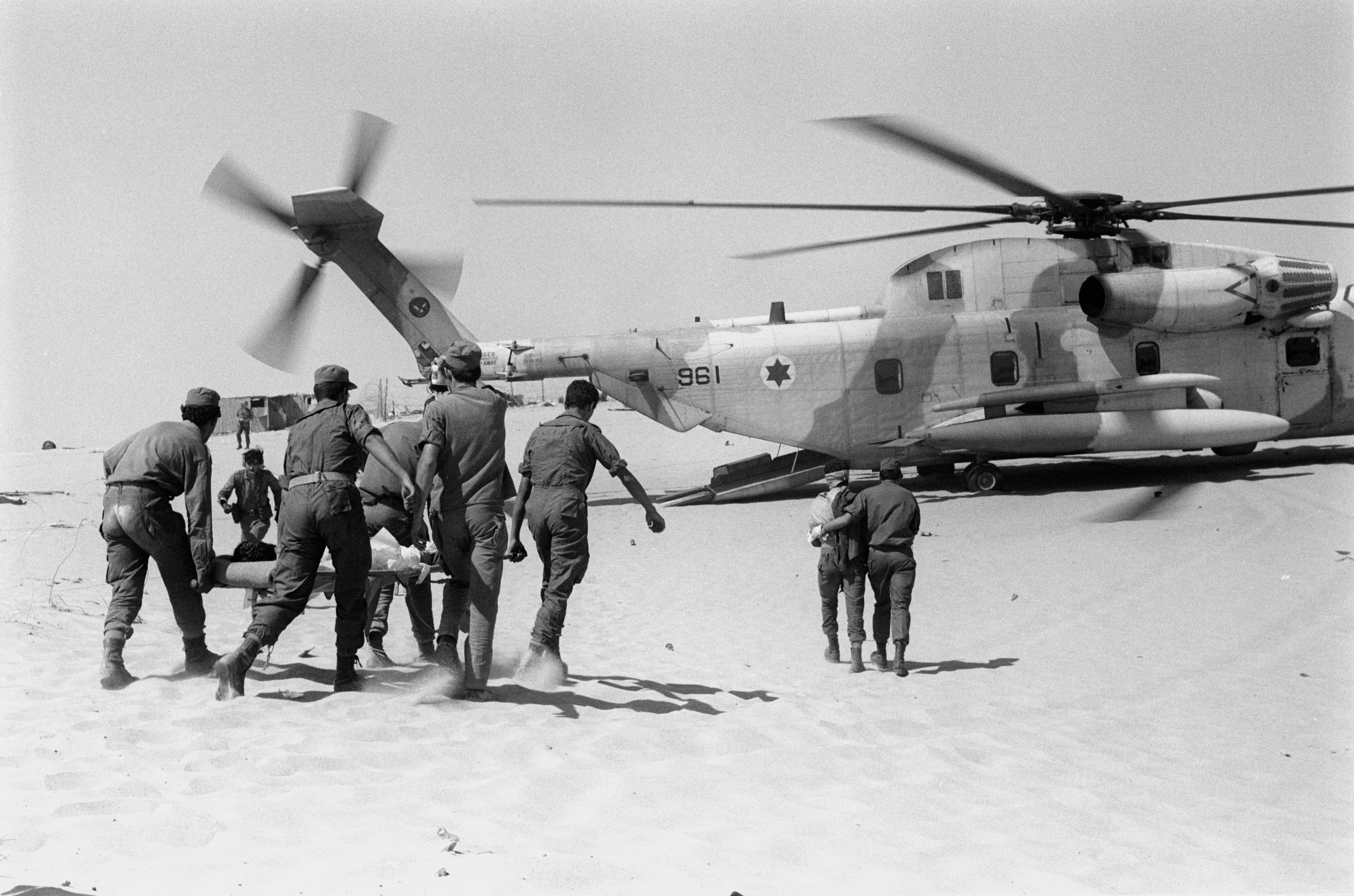
118 Squadron S-63C-3 (CH-53D) Yas'ur evacuating wounded soldiers during the Yom Kippur war, 1973.

=== Post Yom Kippur ===
The 118 Squadron was the first of the two Yas'ur squadrons to undergo a major upgrade program, referred to as "Yas'ur 2000", with the means to improve the CH-53s' avionics and increase their robustness, as well as extend the fleet's operating life by at least two decades. The first helicopter arrived at the workshops of the 22nd Aerial Maintenance Unit (AMU) in 1992, and the program was completed in 1997, converting the fleet to CH-53-2000 standards.

In September 1989, several Yas'urs from the 118 Squadron were used to perform firefighting operations on and around the Mount Carmel forest fire. It was the first time the Yas'urs were used for firefighting operations, which was being experimented using an improvised device to carry large water buckets called "Yearit". The Yas'urs performed dozens of low flyovers into the smoke and flames, dumped 700 tons of water on the fire, and doused it. Firefighting operations for the Yas'urs ceased in the early 2000s, after it was determined that the prolonged carriage of the water buckets over the years caused structural damage to the helicopters.

On 10 August 1992, a 118 Squadron Yas'ur was conducting a nighttime training mission with soldiers from Unit 669. While performing a rescue exercise using the helicopter's rescue hoist, the cable snapped and the two soldiers hanging on the cable fell 15 meters to their deaths. This event is known as the "Cable Disaster". In the aftermath of the investigation five years later, in 1997, it was determined that the accident occurred due to inadequate operation of the rescue hoist by the flight mechanic and neglecting several safety procedures, which resulted with the court-martial of the 118 Squadron and Unit 669 commanders, as well as the flight mechanic. In a different training mission that occurred in 1996 in the Judaean Desert, the helicopter involved in the "Cable Disaster", reg 066 (#65-224), crashed moments after taking off, with 7 of the occupants killed and 2 others injured.

On 4 February 1997, two Yas'urs; reg 357 (#65-350) and 903 (#65-123), ferrying Israeli soldiers into Israel's security zone in southern Lebanon collided in mid-air, killing all 73 military personnel on board. The crash brought about widespread national mourning and is considered a leading factor in Israel's decision to withdraw from southern Lebanon in 2000.

=== Second Lebanon War and the 2000s ===
The Night Raptors next major engagement occurred during the 2006 Lebanon War, in which the squadron conducted over 200 combat sorties, as well as participating in Operation Sharp and Smooth, where Yas'urs of the squadron transported special forces deep into Lebanon. There was only one combat loss of a CH-53 during the war, reg 053 (#65-347), in which all occupants were killed after the helicopter was hit by a Hezbollah guided anti-tank missile. Among the casualties was Sergeant First Class Keren Tendler, the first female flight mechanic of the IAF's CH-53 fleet.

In October 2006, the CH-53 underwent a second major upgrade program, referred to as "Yas'ur 2025", after the IAF failed to find a reliable replacement for the aging CH-53 fleet, which could also match the IAF's standards for the heavy transport role. The program was completed in 2015 and converted all helicopters to CH-53-2025 standards with new and improved flight control systems and gearboxes, airborne laser scanning, digital flight computers, navigational systems, and a hovering system.

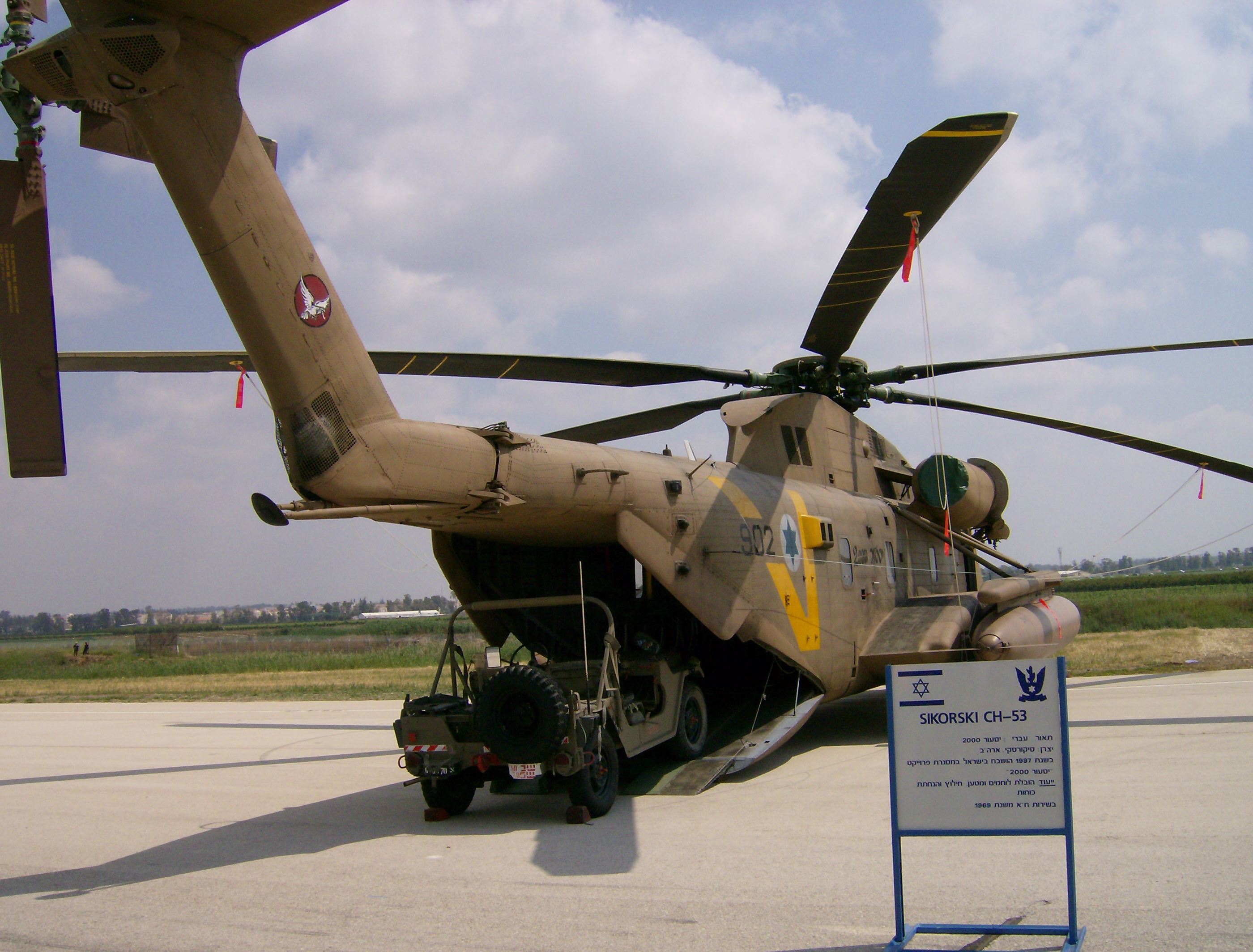
118 Squadron CH-53-2000 Yas'ur in an exhibition at Tel Nof AFB, with a military Jeep at the back.

=== 2010s ===
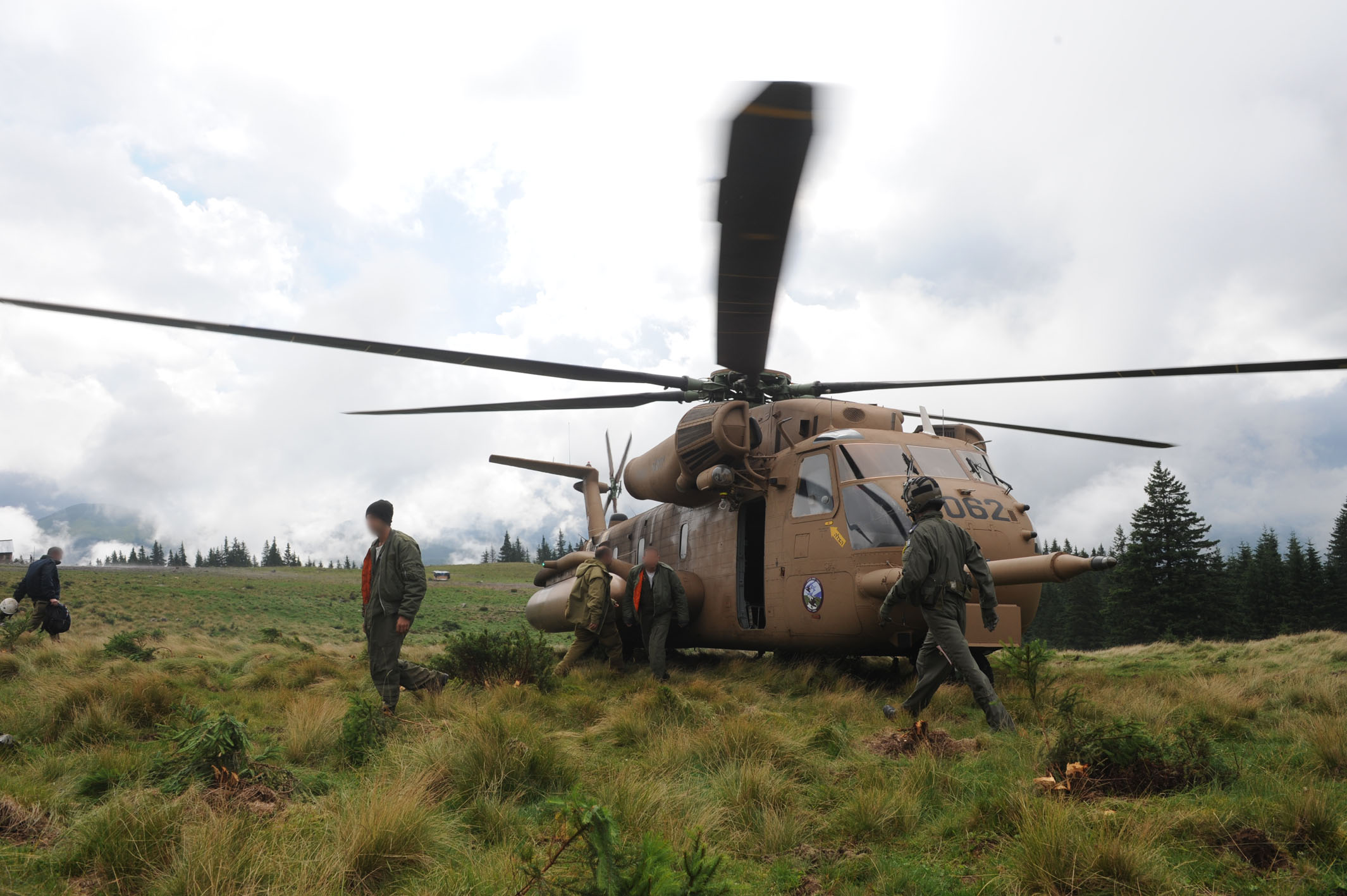
IDF delegation with 118 Squadron in Romania, while on the search for the bodies of the victims from the helicopter crash, 2010.

In July 2010, 118 Squadron participated in the military aviation exercise code-named "Blue Sky 2010", an 11-day joint Israeli-Romanian low-altitude, search and rescue training, which took place in the Carpathian Mountains, near the city of Brașov in Romania. On July 26, a pair of Yas'urs took off from the Romanian Air Force Base in Boboc for training. During the flight, Yas'ur 046 (#65-401) lost radio and visual contact with its counterpart due to heavy fog, and the former eventually crashed into the mountains, killing all seven military personnel on board: four Israeli pilots, two Israeli flight mechanics, and one Romanian Air Force liaison officer. The investigation determined that the cause of the crash was due to human error.

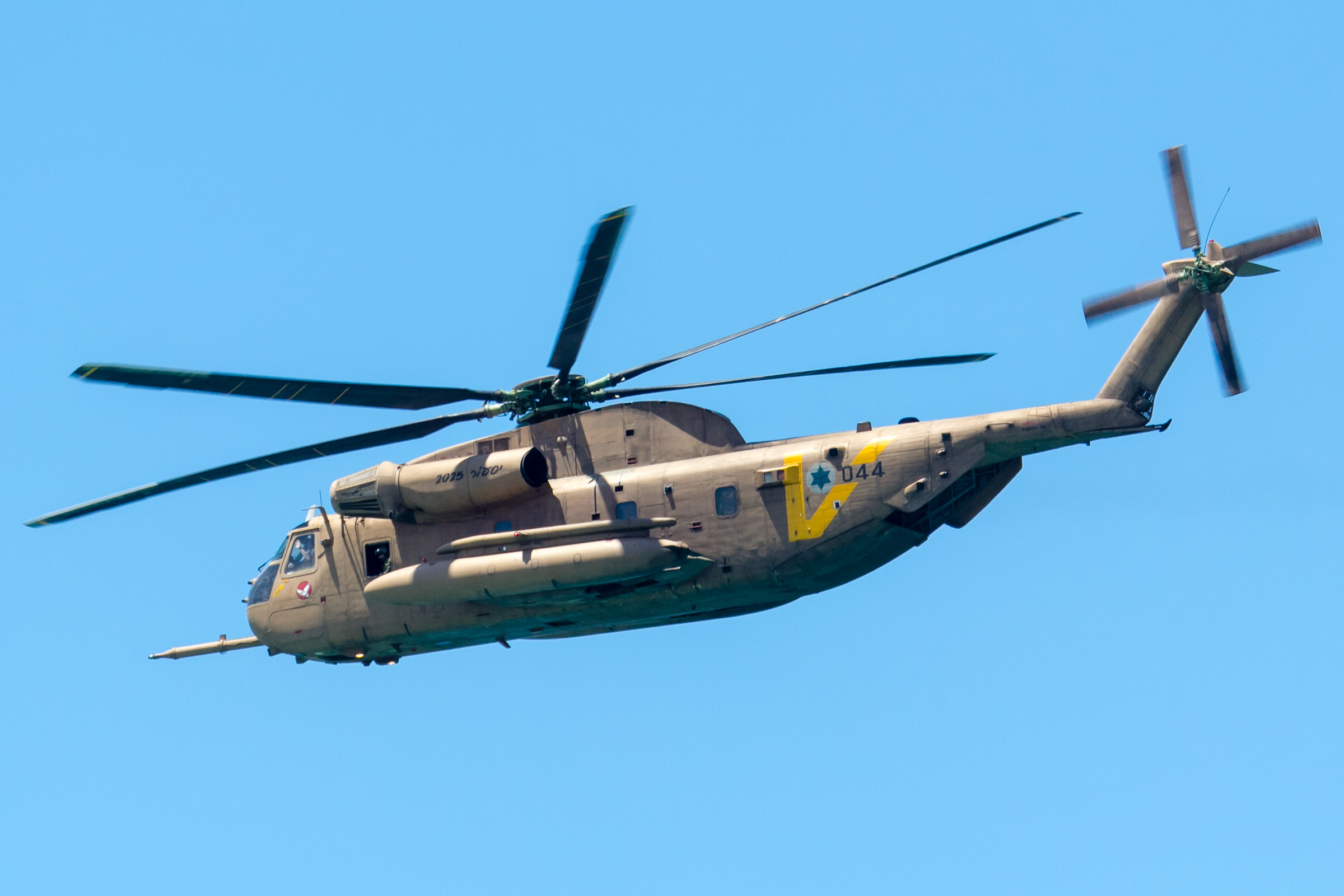
118 Squadron CH-53-2025 Yas'ur during Israel's 68th Independence Day flypast, 2016.

In 2011, the IAF needed a replacement aircraft after the 2010 accident. Since Sikorsky ceased producing the S-65 line back in 1978, procuring a new helicopter was impossible. Instead, the IAF recommissioned Yas'ur 985 (#65-149), which originally was decommissioned in the early 2000s due to reduction of the CH-53 fleet and used to be stripped for replacement parts. The helicopter was renovated at the 22nd Aerial Maintenance Unit, upgraded to the "Yas'ur 2025" standards, and finally arrived at 118 Squadron in February 2012. Coincidentally, the same aircraft was destroyed 11 years later during the Gaza war.

=== Squadrons Merge and the 2020s ===
On 4 July 2023, as part of the IAF's acquisition of the new Sikorsky CH-53K King Stallion, 114 Squadron was merged into 118 Squadron, making the latter the sole heavy transport unit in the IAF, until 114 Squadron would be recommissioned with the arrival of the new helicopters in 2026.

On 7 October 2023, a flight of two Yas'urs was deployed to combat duty in the wake of the Gaza war. The flight was ordered to pick up a platoon of around 50 paratroopers, but due to time constraints, only one Yas'ur landed to carry all the 50 paratroopers; a condition which was very unusual and against the IAF's standard procedure of carrying up to 33 troops only. While approaching its landing zone, the Yas'ur was hit by a Hamas anti-tank rocket in its left engine. The pilot managed to land safely in an open field, offloading both the aircrew and the paratroopers. The Yas'ur was then hit by a second anti-tank rocket, completely destroying the helicopter. The occupants survived the attack with minor to medium injuries.

== Additional insignias ==
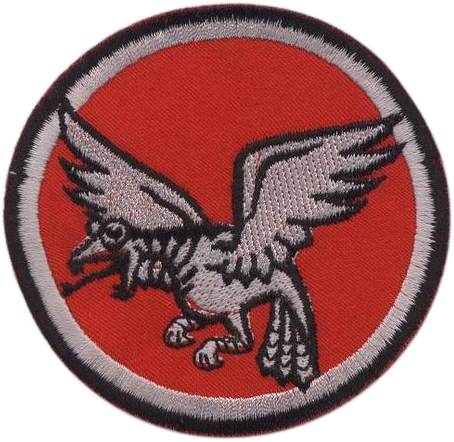
118 Squadron shoulder patch

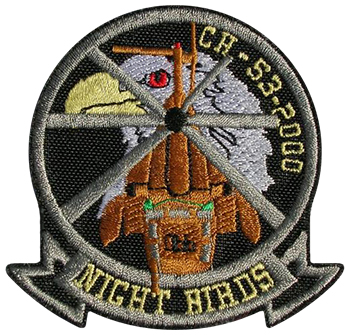
CH-53-2000 shoulder patch

=== See also ===
- Third Battle of Mount Hermon
- 1997 Israeli helicopter disaster
- Operation Sharp and Smooth
- 2010 IAF Sikorsky CH-53 crash
- Be'eri massacre
