= Operation Rhodes =

Israeli raid on Shadwan Island as part of War of Attrition

Coordinates: 27°27′14″N 34°01′53″E

- Part of War of Attrition
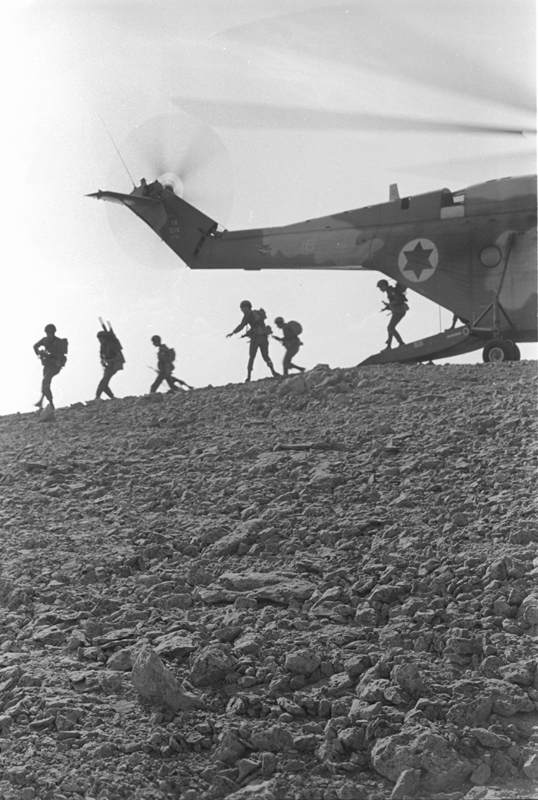
- Israeli paratroopers landing on Shadwan Island from a Super Frelon helicopter
Date	January 22, 1970
Location	Shadwan Island, Gulf of Suez
Result	Israeli victory

Belligerents
Israel	Egypt

Commanders and leaders
Haim Bar Lev; Haim Nadal	Saad El Shazly

Units involved
35th Paratroopers Brigade: Sayeret Tzanhanim; 202nd Battalion; Israeli Navy: Shayetet 13; Israeli Air Force: 114 Squadron	Egyptian Navy

Casualties and losses
3 killed, 7 injured	70 killed, 62 POWs

Operation Rhodes (Hebrew: מבצע רודוס) was an Israeli heliborne raid against the Egyptian island of Shadwan on 22 January 1970, during the War of Attrition. It was carried out by Israeli paratroopers and Shayetet 13 naval commandos, who took control of the island for over a day before leaving with 62 captured Egyptian soldiers and radar equipment.

== Background ==
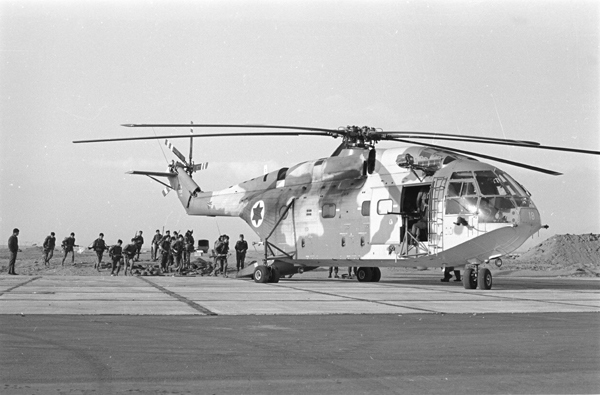
Israeli paratroopers boarding a helicopter for the incursion on Shadwan

Egypt had launched the War of Attrition in order to weaken Israel's hold on the territories in the Sinai it had captured during the 1967 Six-Day War. While the war raged mainly along the Suez Canal, Israel hoped to secure a ceasefire by showing Cairo that it could strike anywhere in Egypt and by presenting the Egyptian leadership with the prospect of an all out conflict for which Egypt was likely ill-prepared. Refusing to limit the war to the canal front, in January 1970 Israel launched Operation Priha, a series of Israeli Air Force strikes against targets in the Egyptian heartland, while its ground forces were tasked with a strike at the isolated and lightly garrisoned Shadwan. The aim of the raid was to capture Egyptian POWs to be exchanged for Israeli prisoners in Egypt, and to sabotage a local radar post which was deemed a threat to Israeli shipping in the Gulf of Suez.

The task of taking Shadwan was assigned to the Israel Defense Forces' Paratroopers Brigade under the command of Haim Nadal. Its 202nd Battalion, commanded by Lt. Colonel Ya'acov Hasdai, and the brigade's elite reconnaissance company (Sayeret Tzanhanim), commanded by Captain Motti Paz, were to land on the island. These were to be assisted Shayetet-13 operators, while additional paratroops were to be at hand at Sharm el-Sheikh and on nearby Israeli Navy vessels.

The Egyptian garrison on Shadwan was headquartered in the island's lighthouse, at its southern tip. The lighthouse was defended by a fortified perimeter consisting of 9 outlying outposts and manned by a company of Egyptian Sa'ka Forces commandos. In all, 100 Egyptian soldiers were present on Shadwan, of which 60 were commandos and the rest Egyptian Navy and technical personnel.

== Battle ==
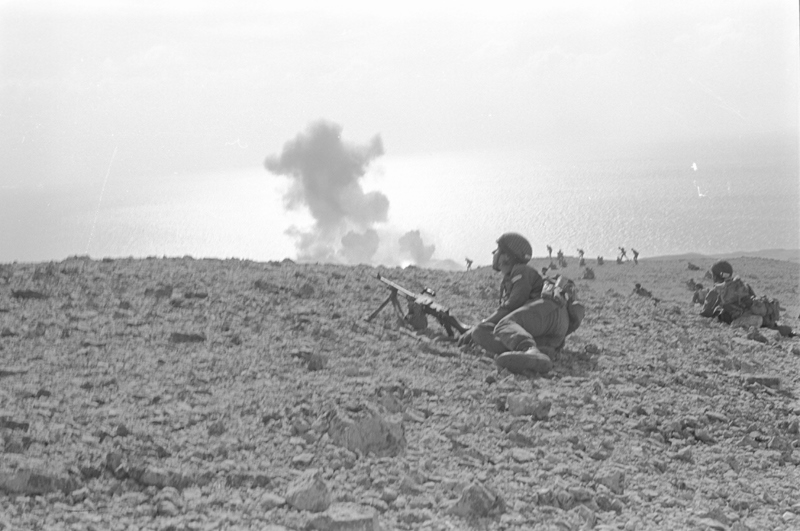
Israeli paratroopers in action during the operation

Operation Rhodes commenced on the morning of January 22, 1970, with a strike by twelve 109 and 115 Squadrons A-4 Skyhawks which killed a number of Egyptian soldiers, including the officer commanding of the local garrison. With the defenders thus engaged, Israeli ground forces started landing on Shadwan, ferried to the island by a pair of Bell 205s and 114 Squadron's fleet of Aerospatiale Super Frelons. Landing at 09:15, the forces disembarked a mile north of the lighthouse and broke up into various elements. Hasdai's battalion moved to capture the outposts on the island's eastern side and those leading to the lighthouse, fighting Egyptian soldiers who refused Israeli calls to surrender. Within an hour after landing, all but three outposts had fallen to the paratroops. One Israeli soldier, corporal Haim Isrovich, was killed by sniper fire.

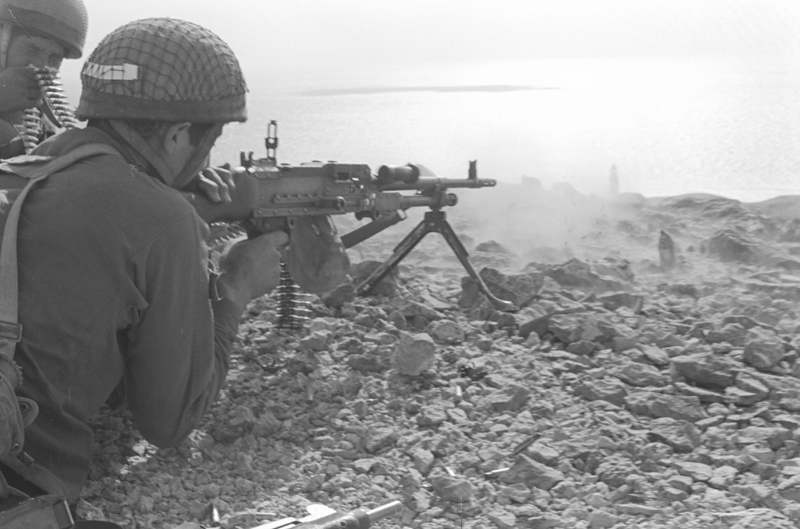
An Israeli FN MAG machine gun crew engaging the enemy during the operation

Paz's troops, attempting to flank the Egyptian forces from the west, met with resistance on the defensive perimeter's western side, only to enter a minefield. One officer, Lt. Israel Bar-Lev, was killed and several injured, and the force withdrew, leaving the posts codenamed "Dafna" and "Dvora" in Egyptian hands. At 10:30 the reserve force at Sharm el-Sheikh, led by Lt. Colonel Amos Yaron was therefore dispatched to the island.

A force led by Lt. Yitzhak Kotler, meanwhile, arrived at the lighthouse. Despite expecting significant resistance, little movement was spotted at the site, and at 12:00 the Israeli troops stormed the building. A few rooms were initially found to be empty, but fire soon erupted from a building on the western side of the compound, hitting Kotler and leaving the force leaderless. Hasdai instructed one of Kotler's squad's to flank the structure and clear it out using grenades. By 12:57 they managed to secure the building, which was found to be defended by only a pair of Egyptian soldiers, one of whom was killed and the other injured. An Israeli helicopter soon arrived to ferry both the Egyptian officer and Kotler to hospital, though the latter died of his wounds.

Landing on the island at 11:30, Amos Yaron was dispatched by Nadal to overcome remaining resistance at the western edge of the island's defensive perimeter. Leading a three-pronged assault, Yaron, aided by a pair of Israeli Air Force strike aircraft, secured the post codenamed "Dafna" by 14:15. Nearby "Dvora" was soon secured as well and by 15:30 fighting had ceased. 14 Egyptians had been captured and 17 killed. Several dozen more POWs were found in subsequent scouring of the island.

=== Air Force participation ===
After their initial support of the landings, Israeli Air Force aircraft provided continuous close air support to the forces on the ground, while Israeli Air Force fighters patrolled the airspace around the island to prevent Egyptian reinforcement. The operation also saw Israeli A-4s debut as aerial tankers, with 109 squadron providing inflight refueling for other Israeli aircraft on station.

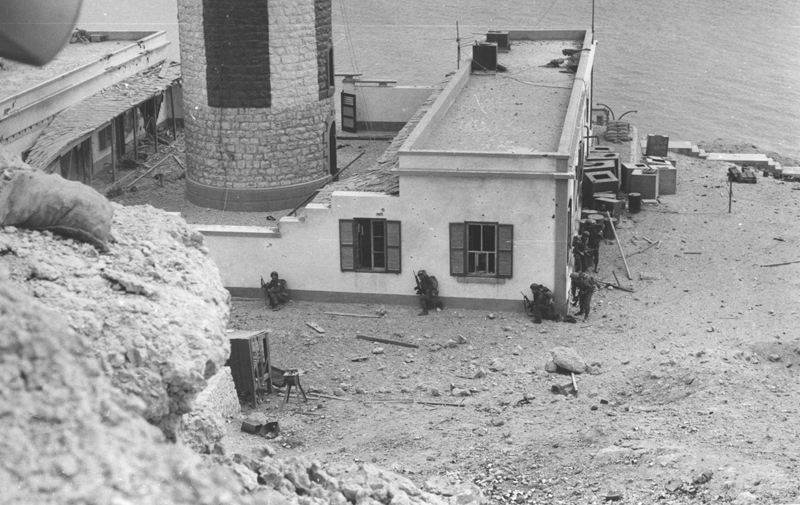
Israeli troops raid the lighthouse

As the battle was underway, a mixed formation of two 109 Squadron and two 115 squadron Skyhawks spotted a pair of Egyptian torpedo boats heading for the island from Hurghada. The aircraft attacked the boats with air-to-ground rockets, sinking both. A slightly more successful attempt at intervention took place shortly after midnight on January 23, when a single Egyptian Air Force Ilyushin Il-28 bomber managed to evade Israeli aircraft on patrol. The aircraft made a single bombing pass but failed to cause any damage.

=== Evacuation ===
Holding the island throughout the night, Israeli forces received the order to evacuate at 11:50 on the morning of January 23. All structures save for the lighthouse were demolished and the forces withdrew with 62 Egyptian POWs and a captured British Decca radar set. The last helicopter, bearing Haim Nadal, departed the island at 17:40. 3 Israelis had been killed and 7 injured, while Israeli spokesmen put the number of Egyptian fatalities at 70, including both soldiers on Shadwan and on the sunk torpedo boats.

== Aftermath ==
Despite the operation's successful outcome, its aftermath was not as laudable. On January 24, two days after the operation, a truck carrying ammunition captured on Shadwan exploded after was brought ashore at Eilat, killing 24 people. Palestinian militants attempted to claim responsibility for the explosion.

Egypt admitted to 80 soldiers killed, wounded or missing, but attempted to paint the Israeli raid in the best possible light. It initially reported that Israelis "attempted to land" on the island and had suffered 30 casualties and lost 2 aircraft, and later claimed Israeli forces failed to remain on the island "due to stiff resistance on land and massive air strikes". The Egyptian press focused on the actions of Captain Hosni Hamad, who had lost his life leading the torpedo boats to the island under his own initiative.

Operation Rhodes had taken place a few days after the launch of Operation Priha, which had underscored Egypt's inability to counter Israeli aerial supremacy. Egyptian President Gamal Abdel Nasser, rather than opting for a ceasefire, turned to the Soviet Union for military assistance. On the same day as Operation Rhodes, Nasser secretly left Cairo for Moscow for a series of clandestine talks. Within weeks, Soviet hardware and personnel began arriving in Egypt, signalling a new phase in the War of Attrition.
