= Shadwan Island =

Egyptian island in the Red Sea

Shadwan Island جزيرة شدوان
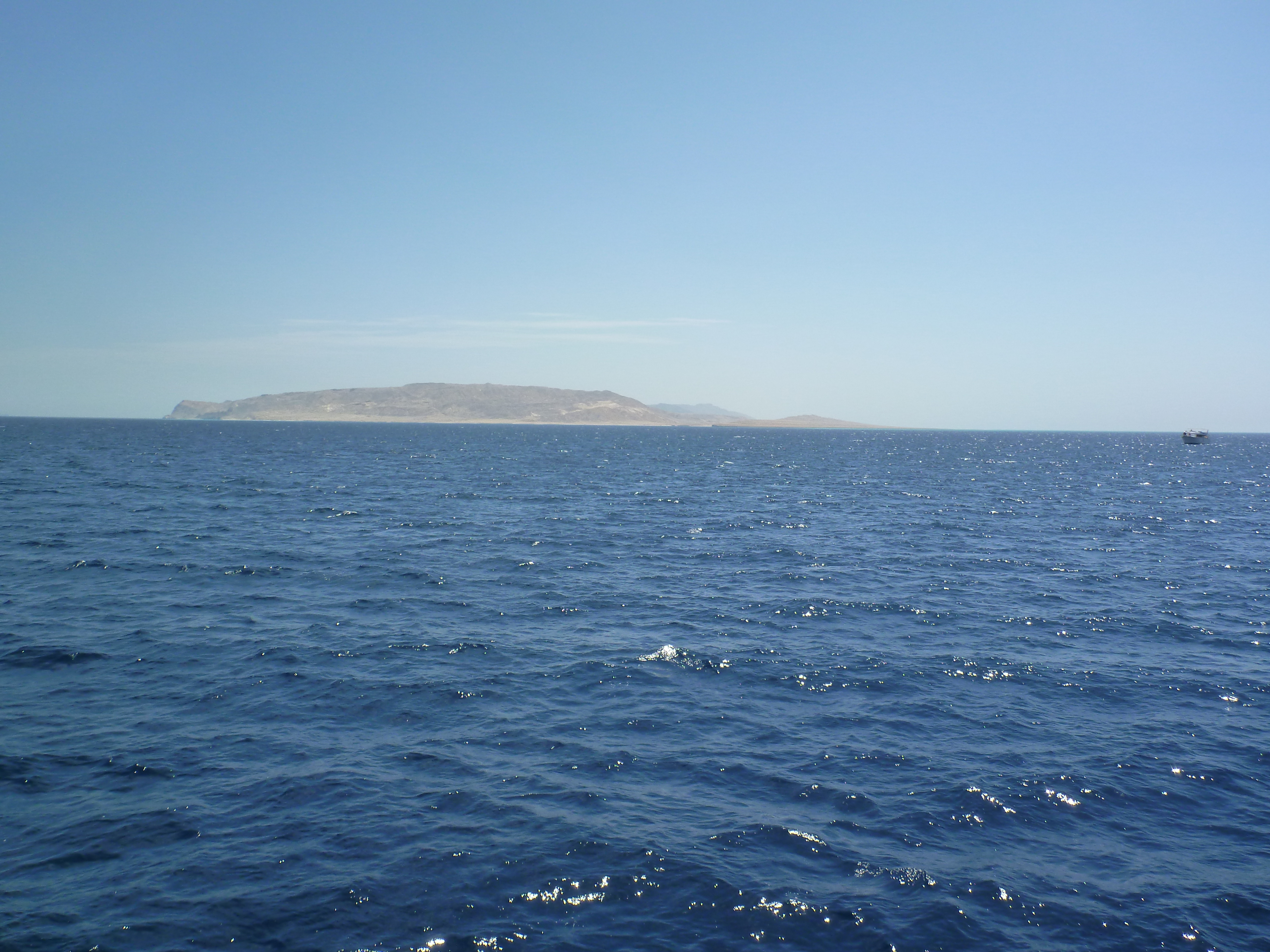
- Shadwan from a boat

- Location in Egypt Shadwan Island (Egypt)
- Coordinates: 27°34′10.8006″N 34°09′28.3212″E
- Country: Egypt
- Governorate: Red Sea Governorate
- Markaz: Hurghada

Area
  - Total: 42.49 km^{2} (16.41 sq mi)
  - Land: 42.49 km^{2} (16.41 sq mi)
- Time zone: UTC+2 (EST)

Shadwan (Egyptian Arabic: جزيرة شدوان) is a barren rocky island 30 miles southwest of the Egyptian city of Sharm el-Sheikh on the Sinai Peninsula and 20 miles northeast of El Gouna. It is the largest of a group of islands in the mouth of the Gulf of Suez in the northern Red Sea and measures 16 kilometres (9.9 mi) in length, and between 3 and 5 kilometres (1.9 and 3.1 mi) wide. It was formerly also called Shaker Island and features a lighthouse. The island is famous as a touristic site for underwater diving and fishing.

== Earthquake ==
On 31 March 1969 the island was the site of an earthquake measuring 6.6 on the surface-wave magnitude scale. The earthquake caused some damage including numerous rock falls. On 9 April 1996 a station of the Hurghada Seismological Network began operating on the island with the aim of gaining information on the seismotectonics of the southern Gulf of Suez region. The station is operated by solar batteries and the seismic data is transmitted by telemetry to the Hurghada Seismological Center in Hurghada.

== History ==
During the War of Attrition between Israel and Egypt, the island was fortified and held by Egyptian troops. On 22 January 1970, it was the site of Operation Rhodes, a heliborne assault by Israeli troops which occupied the island for 36 hours. 70 Egyptian and 3 Israeli soldiers died during the battle.
