= 114 Squadron (Israel) =

Israeli military unit

114th Squadron IAF
- טייסת 114
- Logo of the Squadron
- Country: Israel
- Allegiance: Israel Defense Forces
- Branch: Israeli Air Force
- Type: Helicopter Squadron
- Role: Transport
- Garrison/HQ: Tel Nof Airbase
- Nickname: Night Carriers Squadron

Aircraft flown
- Helicopter: CH-53-2000 Sea Stallions

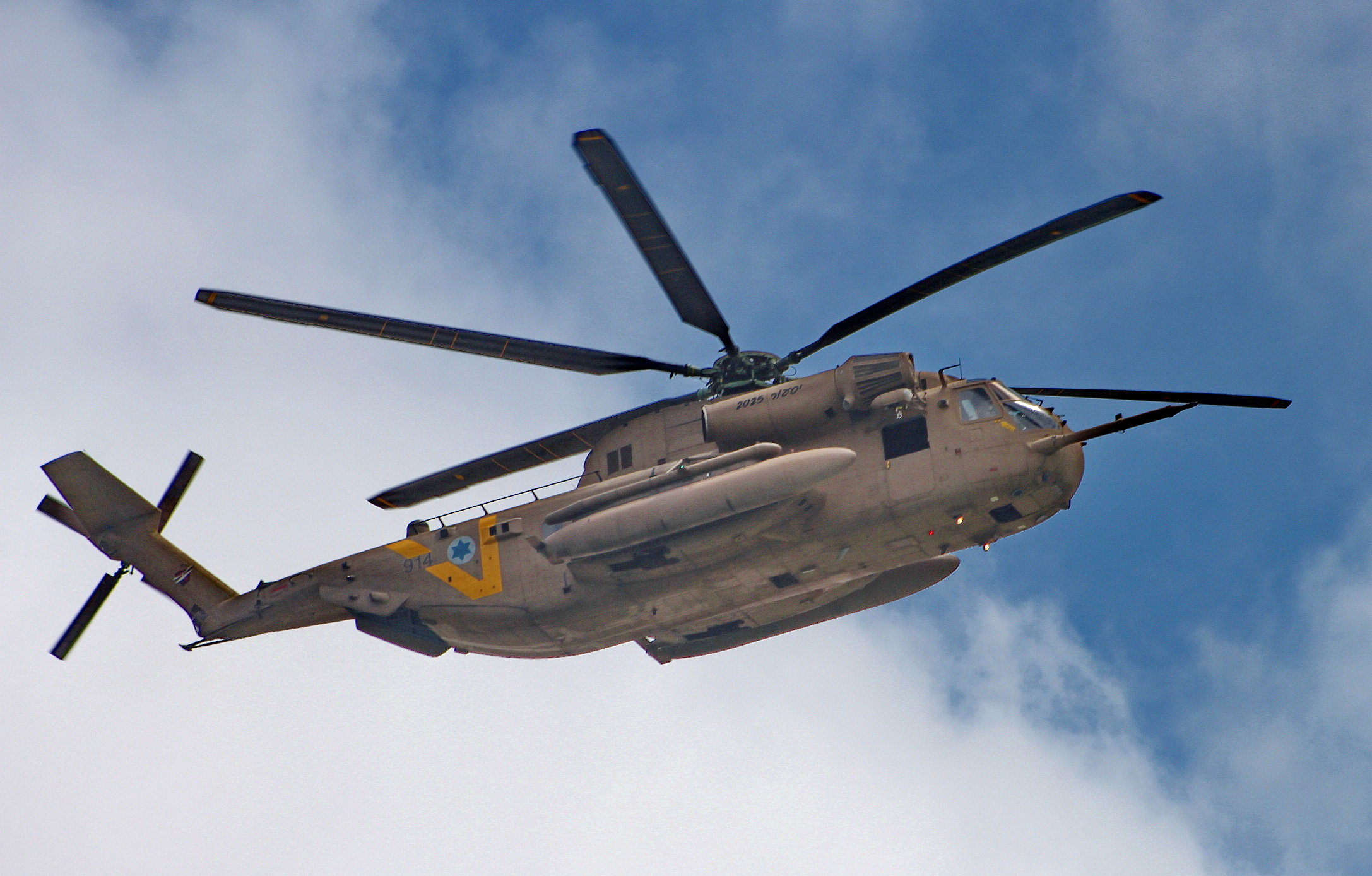
Israeli Air Force 114 Squadron CH-53 at the 2012 Independence Day Flypast. Tel Aviv shore, April 2012.

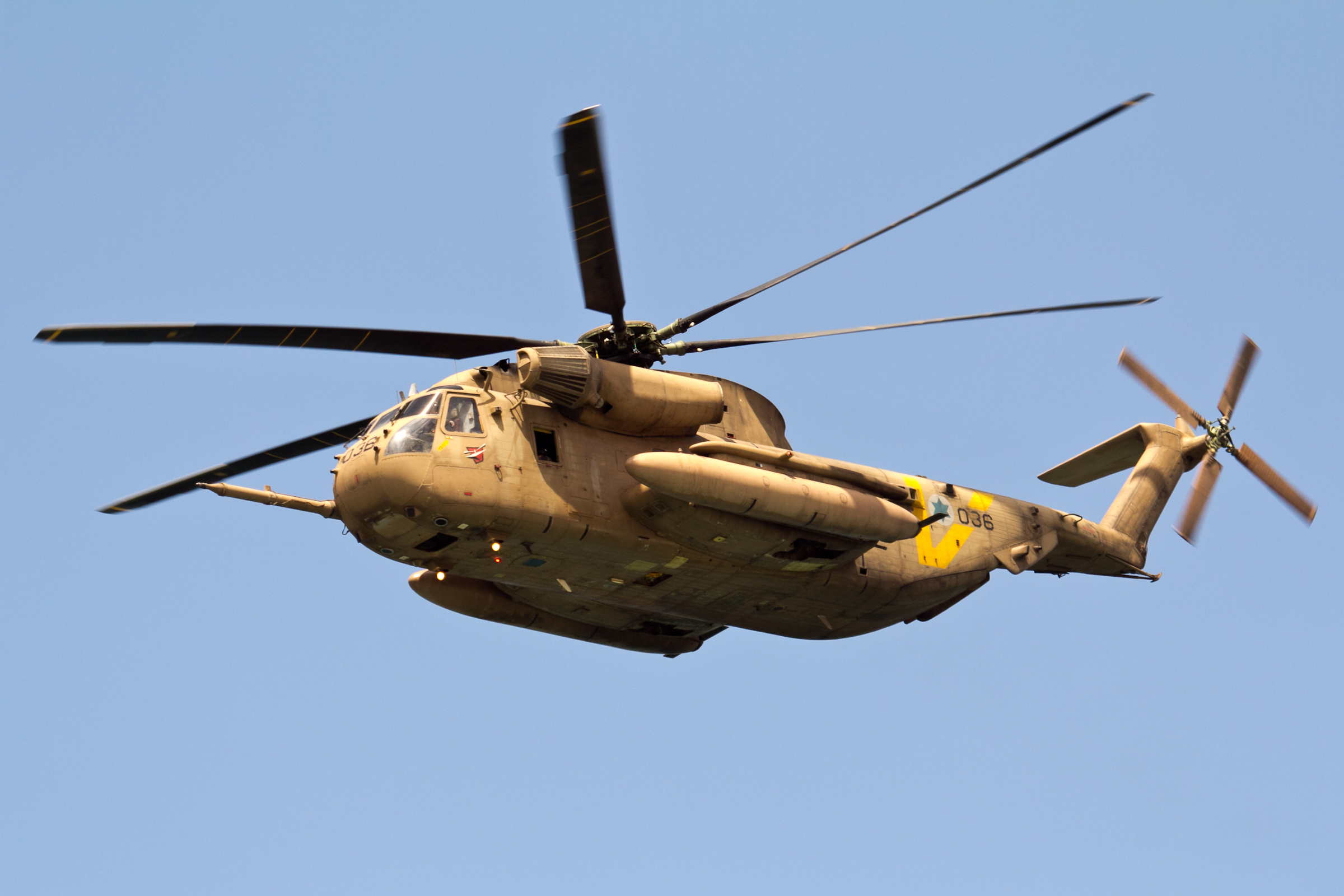
Flypast of Yassur Helicopter of the squadron

The 114 Squadron of the Israeli Air Force, also known as the Night Carriers Squadron, is a helicopter squadron of CH-53-2000 Sea Stallions based at Tel Nof Airbase.

In July 2023 its helicopters and crews merged with the 118 Squadron. The 114 has been temporarily made inactive until new CH-53K King Stallions come from the US.

== History ==
The squadron was established in January 1966, against the background of the growing need for transport helicopters. It was the second helicopter squadron in the Air Force and the first heavy helicopter squadron. Haim Noveh and operations officer Nehemia Dagan, who returned from training in France on the Super Ferlon helicopters, were appointed to the headquarters. In April of that year, the first Super Farlon helicopters were received in the squadron. In February 1967, Neve and Dagan Khokht flew a military patrol deep into Egypt as part of an intelligence-gathering mission called "Operation Yirgazi". Both of them, as well as the airborne mechanic Asher Atrog, were awarded the exemplary decoration.

In the Six Day War, the squadron operated four helicopters that carried out 41 sorties of landing troops, equipment and rescuing casualties. After the war, the squadron's helicopters rescued 24 drowning victims of the destroyer Eilat.

In December 1968, three squadron helicopters landed forces from a patrol of the Joint Chiefs of Staff and the paratrooper brigade that raided Beirut International Airport as part of Operation Tishura. During the War of Attrition, under the command of Neve and Perry, the squadron participated in many operations, including on the Egyptian front: Operation Shock, in which they raided three Targets deep in Egypt, one helicopter landed a force of paratroopers that hit a power plant and two helicopters landed bombs on a bridge and a dam in the Nile River in operations "Bustan 22" and "Bustan 37" they landed forces that sabotaged high voltage lines and in Operation Rhodes they led forces that raided the island of Shadoan. On the Syrian front: "Operation Marilyn" and Operation "Sheft 47" in which IDF forces led the way in blowing up bridges in Syria, Operation "Malka 30" and "Sheft 37" in which they led paratroopers who shelled military camps with mortars. On the Jordanian front, the squadron's helicopters participated in operations against terrorist bases, including Operation Karama, "Operation Assuta" and "Operation Iron".

In October 1969, the squadron received the first attack helicopters purchased by Israel, and two months later the helicopters, together with the veteran Super Ferlon helicopters, participated in Operation Rooster 53, in which paratroopers raided an Egyptian radar station and allowed the squadron's helicopters to bring it to Israel intact. After the war of attrition, on August 6, 1970, assault helicopters were transferred to a newly established squadron, Squadron 118. During the Yom Kippur War, the squadron operated Super Farlon helicopters, which carried out 331 sorties, at the end of the war they participated in the landing of troops for the recapture of Mount Hermon in Operation Dessert.

During the campaign on Mount Hermon, a helicopter of the squadron was launched on April 27, 1974, to the area of the 'Havitholim' outpost, to rescue seven paratroopers from the 202nd Battalion who were hit by a Syrian shell on the way to Mount Hermon. While attempting to land near the 'Havitholim' outpost, the helicopter crashed and caught fire. His six crew members, two pilots, two airborne mechanics, a doctor and a medic from the Hits 386 evacuation unit (later unit 669), perished.

After the Yom Kippur War, the Air Force received a large number of Yassur helicopters. On January 13, 1975, Gef Yas'or was established in the squadron and it continued to operate both types of helicopters until 1991, when the Super Farlon helicopters went out of service. In May 1977, a Yasir helicopter belonging to the squadron crashed with 10 crew members and another 44 paratrooper brigade fighters, in a disaster known as the aforementioned disaster.

In the mid-2000s, the squadron received its current name, "The Night Carrier Squadron".

In the Second Lebanon War, one of the squadron's helicopters was shot down and its five crew members were killed, after it was hit by anti-tank fire immediately after the landing of troops from the paratrooper brigade in Lebanon. One of the crew members was airborne mechanic Keren Tendler, the only IDF soldier killed in this war.

In total, the squadron has lost 32 fighters since its establishment, including two former squadron commanders (Hagai Kusht and Daniel Shippenbaur) who perished in Yassur accidents. The dead are commemorated at the squadron's memorial site on Mount Haruch near Jerusalem.

On July 7, 2022, it was revealed that 114 Squadron would be the first unit to receive the Sikorsky CH-53K King Stallion ("Wild") helicopters.

On July 4, 2023, the squadron was closed and merged with Squadron 118, until its re-opening as the "Pra" helicopter squadron.

== Sources ==
- "Night Carrier Square". Israeli Air Force.
- Tali Ben-Yosef (26 April 2006). "40 years old in excellent shape". Israeli Air Force.
- Moshe Givati, Survival in September - Operational Lessons from Israel's Wars, Holon: Reot Publishing House, 2013-2013

== See also ==
- Operation Rhodes
