= 2010 Israeli Air Force CH-53 crash =

Aircraft crash

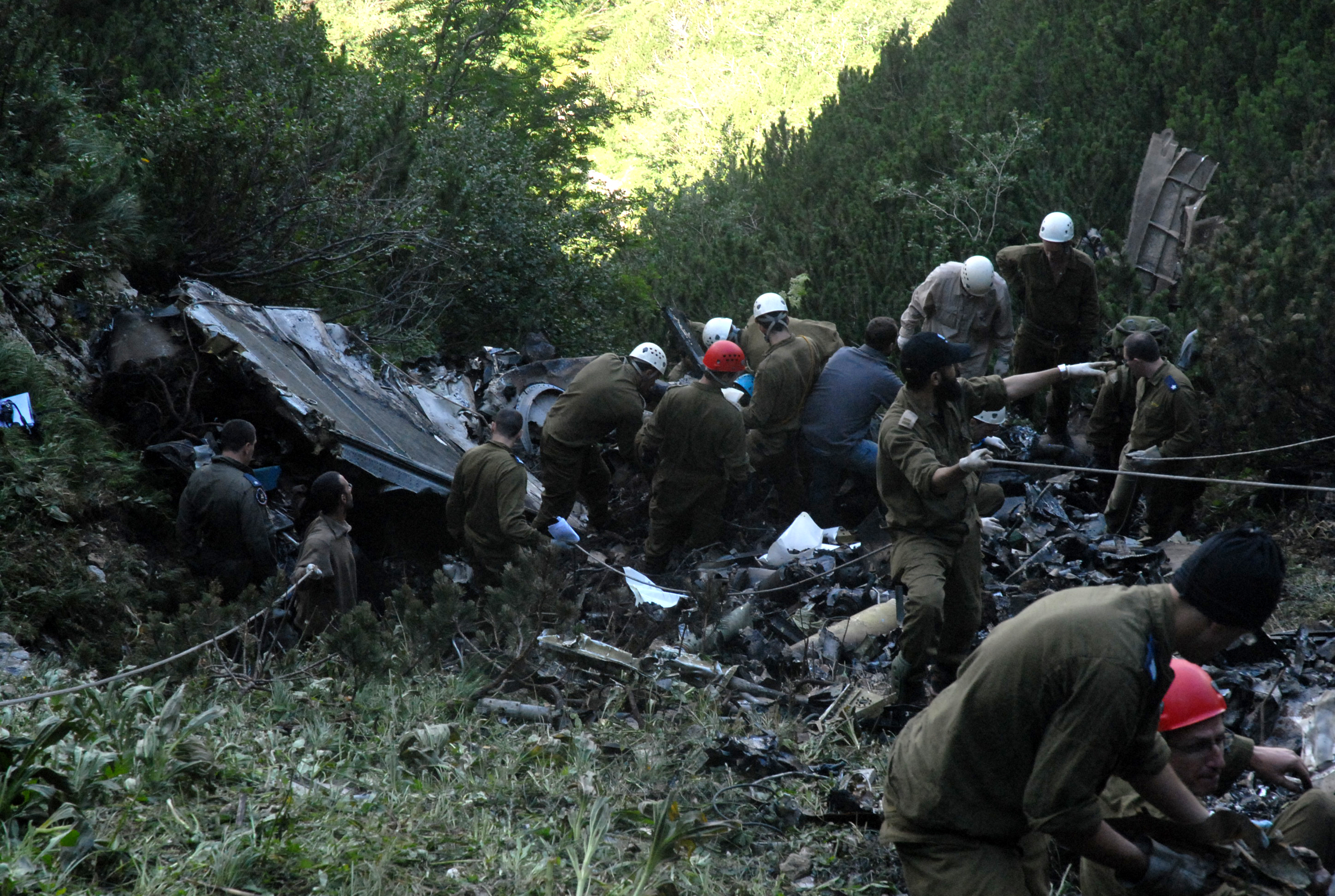
- Rescuers at the crash site

Accident
- Date: 26 July 2010
- Summary: Crashed during training flight
- Site: Bucegi Mountains, 40 km from Brașov; 45°34′0″N 25°20′0″E

Aircraft
- Aircraft type: Sikorsky CH-53 Sea Stallion
- Operator: Israeli Air Force
- Registration: 046
- Occupants: 7
- Fatalities: 7
- Survivors: 0

On 26 July 2010, an Israeli Air Force Sikorsky CH-53 Yas'ur helicopter crashed during a training flight in the Carpathian Mountains, near the city of Brașov in Romania. The accident took place during a joint Romanian-Israeli aviation military exercise code-named "Blue Sky 2010".

All on board the aircraft died: four Israeli pilots, two Israeli mechanics, and one Romanian liaison officer. An investigation into the incident concluded that the crash was most likely due to human error.

== Background ==
In September 2003, an agreement was signed between the Romanian and Israeli Air Forces on cooperation and training, with the first training session being held in August 2004. This cooperation was important to the IAF, as Romania's geography includes high-altitude terrain and climate conditions that are different than those in Israel, and allows the IAF to practice special techniques and train in a different terrain. Another military exercise and cooperation agreement between Israel and Romania was signed in 2006, and was extended in 2009.

On 18 July 2010, a joint exercise of the Israeli Air Force and Romanian Air Force began, in which Yasur helicopters from the 118 Squadron took part. This squadron, based at the Tel Nof air base, has participated in all of Israel's recent major operations and wars, mainly for transporting special forces into enemy territory. The exercise was known as Blue Sky 2010, which was supposed to last for 11 days, and in which the Romanian and Israeli troops practiced flying at low altitudes in difficult terrain for search-and-rescue missions and medical evacuations.

The Yasour transport helicopter, (Sikorsky CH-53), is considered by Israel to be the most reliable aircraft of its kind in the IDF, and has been used for over 40 years. The aircraft was bought from the United States and integrated into the Israeli Air Force service in 1969. The aircraft is used by the IAF's 669 Search and Rescue team, and is also the IAF's main aircraft for transporting soldiers, as it can carry 35 soldiers with all of their equipment. In 2007, under a program called "Yasour 2025," intended to extend the Yasour's life until 2025, the IAF installed over 20 new electronic systems, including, for the first time on helicopters, one for missile defense,

== Accident ==
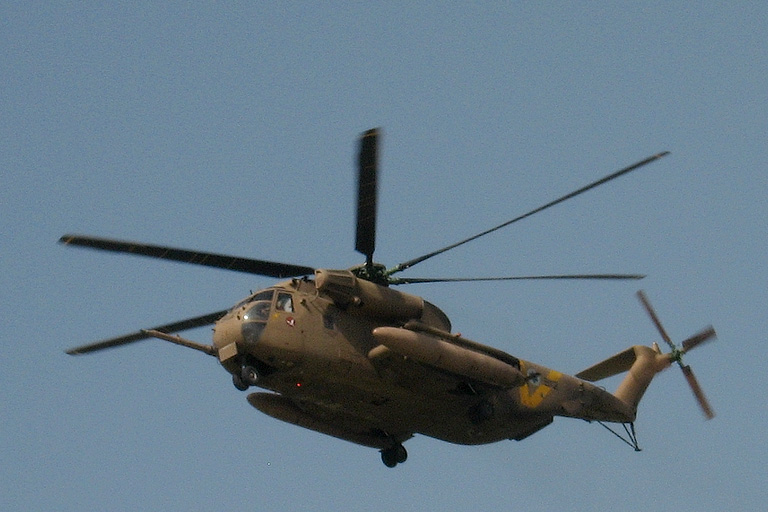
An IAF Sikorsky CH-53 Yas'ur similar to the aircraft involved in the accident

On 26 July 2010 at 1:15 p.m., two Yasur helicopters took off from the Romanian Air Force Base in Boboc and headed north toward the Carpathian Mountains. The fog which prevailed at the flight altitude made it difficult to navigate.

The two helicopters were flying in formation at a low altitude as part of the exercise. While over the Carpathian Mountains in Romania, one of the helicopters radioed that it had lost visual and radio contact with its counterpart. The Israeli Air Force confirmed that it lost contact with one of the helicopters. The helicopter had crashed at approximately 4:00 p.m. at an altitude of 2,246 m (7,369 ft).

== Response ==
Initial reports over the loss of contact with the CH-53 helicopter were received in the Israeli Air Force headquarters at around 5:00 p.m. (Israeli time), and as a result, a gag order was issued in Israel over releasing information concerning the incident. The purpose of this gag order was so the IDF could personally contact and inform the families of the deceased, rather than having them hear about it through the media. Although initially the Israeli media did not report about accident, the Internet was quickly flooded with information about the accident.

The Israeli media noted that despite the seniority of the IAF Sikorsky CH-53 Sea Stallion Yas'ur helicopters, the helicopters were recently upgraded, both in terms of systems and in terms of technical care, as part of the "Yas'ur 2025" program aimed at having the Sikorsky CH-53 helicopters remain in service up until 2025.

=== Search and rescue ===
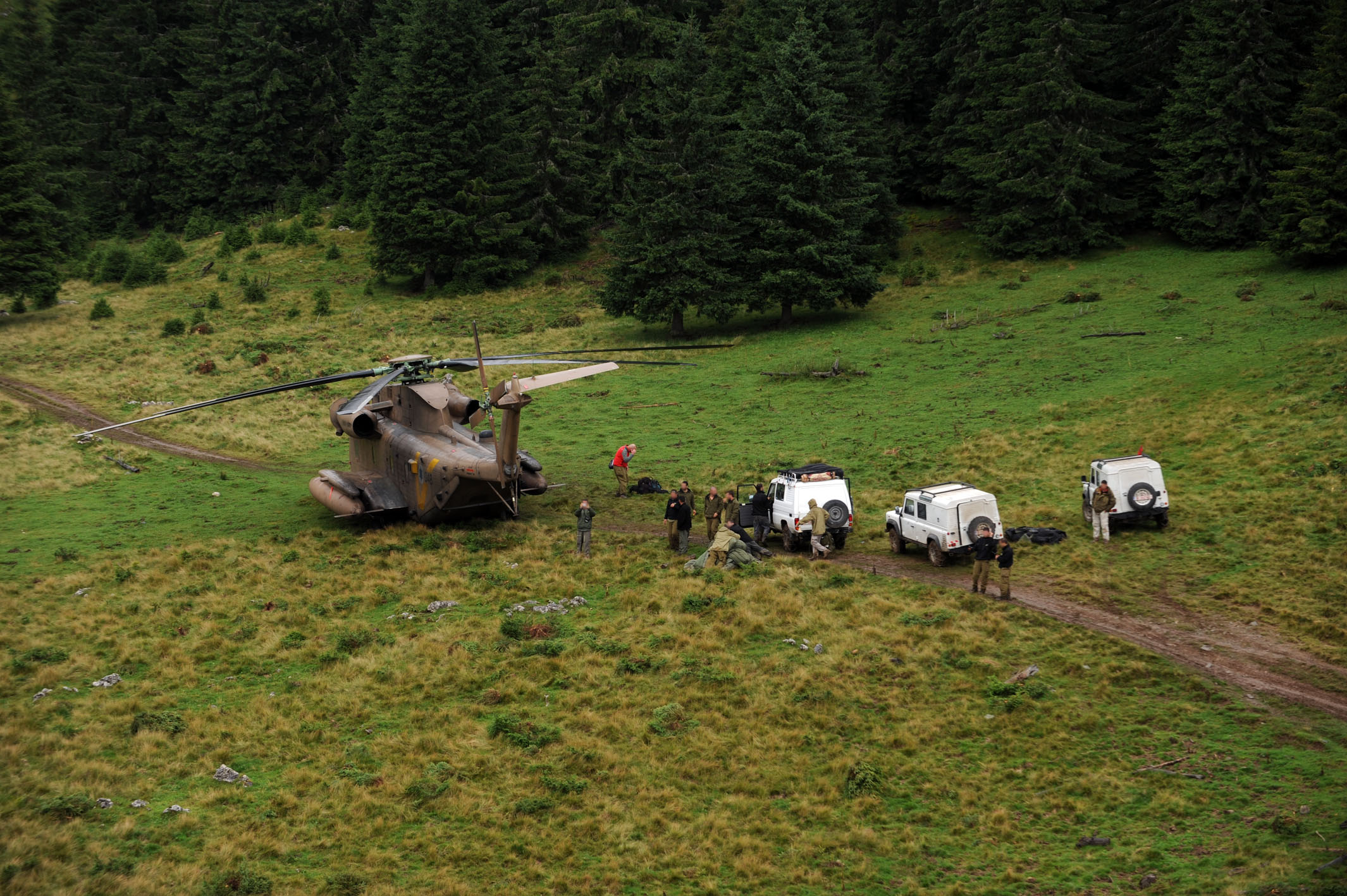
Search operation by the IDF contingent

A search-and-rescue unit was sent by Israel to Romania to assist in the rescue, and included approximately 80 personnel from the IDF Medical Corps, the IAF, the Oketz K-9 Unit, the 669 Airborne Rescue and Evacuation Unit, the Chief Military Rabbinate, search and rescue teams, the IDF Spokesperson's Unit, and an investigatory team to the crash site.

Rescuers could not land near the crash site due to the rugged terrain, and had to either walk to the crash site on a difficult path or be lowered to the site by rope. In addition, the bad weather also made it tougher for search-and-rescue teams to identify and reach the crash site.

The Romanian authorities declared the area around the crash site a closed military zone and sent police and security forces into the mountain the morning after the accident.

On 27 July 2010, the Romanian Defense Ministry officially announced that 7 bodies were found, and that there were no survivors in the accident.

Around midnight on 27 July 2010, the Romanian Army discovered the helicopter's black box. The Romanian troops sent a photo of the black box to the IDF, which confirmed that it was the actual black box of the helicopter. Israeli Air Force officials confirmed that Israel would investigate the black box.

On 30 July, the IDF Chief Rabbi Brigadier-General Raphael Peretz confirmed that all the bodies were identified and that an IAF plane would take off to Israel with the six Israeli bodies during the morning hours of July 30.

== Official reactions ==
=== Israel ===
- On 27 July, Israeli Prime Minister Benjamin Netanyahu said that "the tragedy is immense and that this is a difficult day for every Israeli" and that "today in pain, with a tight throat, we ask how could heroes fall from so high?" Prime Minister Netanyahu explained, "The IDF, its soldiers and commanders guarantee our existence. They stand between our tragic fate in exile, when we were defenseless against the most murderous impulses in history, and where we are today, with the power to defend ourselves from these evils... We fight while searching for those who seek peace." Netanyahu also offered his support to the families of the victims and sent them a "hug" from the entire nation.
- On 29 July, Israeli President Shimon Peres thanked Romanian President Traian Basescu for Romania's close cooperation regarding the crash. President Peres said that he "thanks him from the bottom of his heart, both personally and on behalf of the entire State of Israel, for his personal involvement, warmth he granted Israel and the positive attitude shown in everything related to the treatment of IDF soldiers who perished in the helicopter crash". Peres also conveyed his condolences for the death of the Romanian pilot killed in the crash.

=== Romania ===
- Romania's Defense Ministry announced that military bases across Romania would hold a memorial service in honor of the victims. Defense Minister Gabriel Oprea also conveyed his sorrow over the deaths, as well as his condolences to the families of the soldiers.
- Romanian President Traian Basescu wrote a letter to Israeli President Shimon Peres, which conveyed his condolences to the families of the soldiers. Basescu said, "It is my wish to assure you that the Romanians fully identify with the people of Israel during these difficult times."

== Investigation ==
Immediately after learning of the accident the Air Force Commander Maj. Gen. Ido Nehoshtan appointed an investigative team to look into the causes of the crash, headed by Brigadier-General Shlomo Mashiach.

A short time after, Israeli Air Force officials requested that the Romanian Air Force would bring the remains of the helicopter back to Israel in order that the IDF would carry out a full investigation of the event.

The investigation determined that the accident was most likely due to human error.

== Aftermath ==
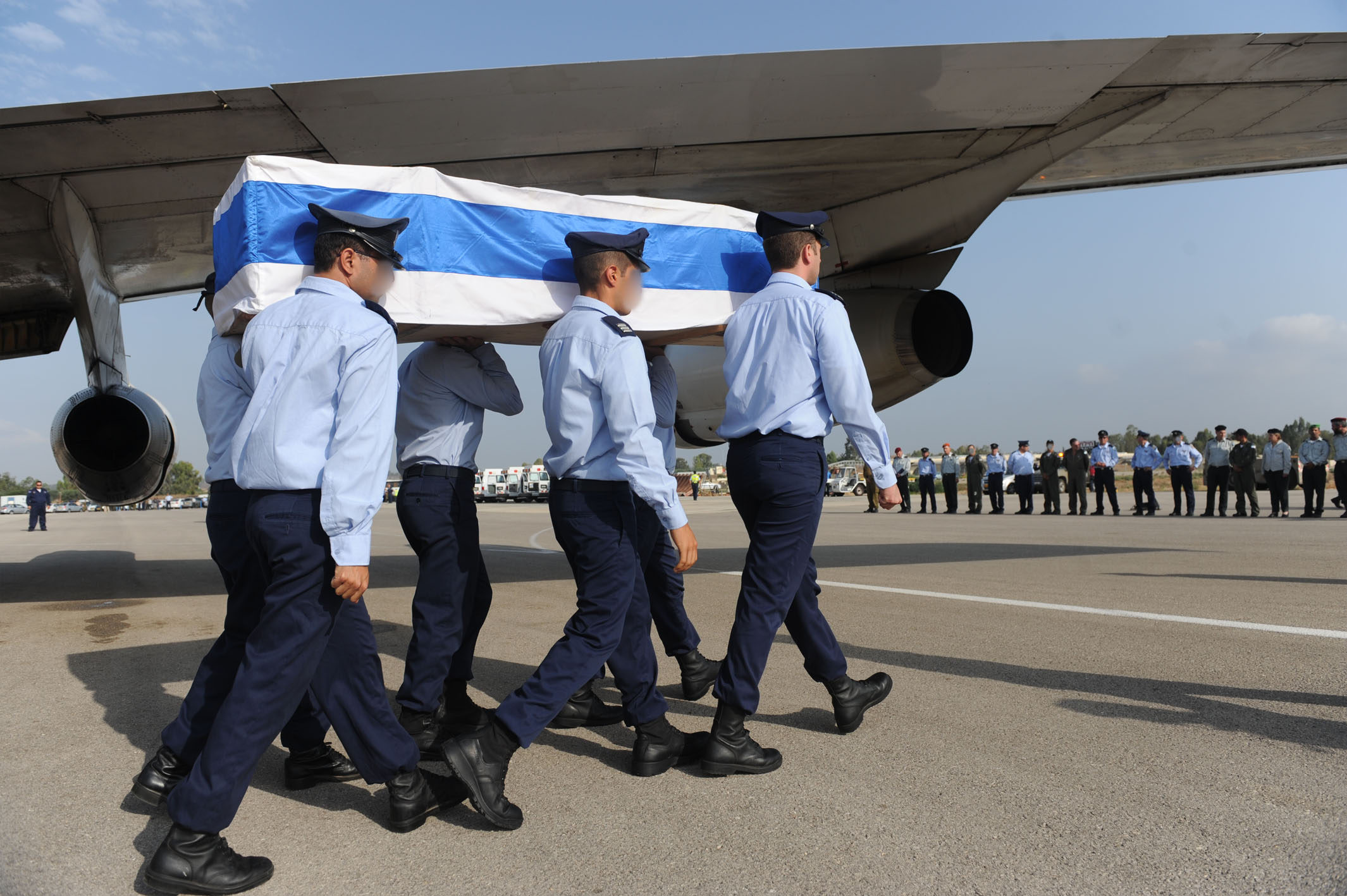
A memorial ceremony for the fallen soldiers of the Yasur helicopter crash was held in Tel Nof Airbase, upon the victims' return to Israel.

=== Funeral ===
Hundreds of Israelis attended the funeral services of the Israeli soldiers who were killed during the crash. The bodies were returned to Israel on an IAF plane which arrived at the Tel Nof airbase. At the funeral services, friends, families, and fellow soldiers eulogized the 6 soldiers who were killed in the crash.

=== Impact ===
All flight exercises were halted by IAF commander Maj. Gen. Ido Nechushtan for a day, in order to conduct safety inspections.

The Romanian and Israeli military aviation commanders decided to collaborate in raising a memorial at the site of the crash.

Seven months after the accident, Israel decided that the widow of the Romanian captain who was killed in an accident would be given the status of a "widow of the Israeli army", and as such she would be granted a monthly pension from the Israeli Defense Ministry. In addition, it was decided that a special fund would be opened for her baby which would include an initial fund of 20,000 dollars.

In 2011, the IAF announced that the Sikorsky CH-53 transport helicopters would return to Romania for training the following summer. In August 2011, the Israeli Air Force sent a Hercules squadron for joint-exercises in Romania, which marked the first time since the Sikorsky CH-53 crash that the IAF sent a squadron for training in Romania. However, Sikorsky squadrons did not take part in the joint-exercises. The joint-training lasted for two weeks.

Cooperation between Israel and Romania increased following the crash, and Romanian Air Force Deputy Commander General Alexander Glushka said that "In the past year, the friendship between us has become a brotherhood. This cooperation is extremely important to us."

In February 2012, the Israel Air Force finished upgrading and rebuilding old Sikorsky 985 helicopters, and turned them into new Sikorsky 2025s. Much time was spent on the project after the Sikorsky CH-53 crash occurred. Israeli Warrant Officer Ziv, Officer of the Cargo Department in the Equipment Squadron, explained that this upgrade was made apparent following the Sikorsky CH-53 crash in Romania, and that "after many examinations it was concluded that the Sikorsky 985 is the most efficient aircraft for our unique project."

=== Memorials ===
On 12 August 2010, a memorial ceremony was held in the central synagogue of Bucharest in Romania, and was attended by representatives of the Romanian Jewish community, Romanian public figures, Israeli President Shimon Peres, and IAF Commander Maj. Gen. Ido Nechushtan. Hermina Darganah, the widow of Romanian Air Force Captain Stephen Claudius Darganah who was killed in the crash, also attended the memorial service, where Peres addressed her personally, saying, "We share the same feelings. You are just as dear to us as any Israeli friend who lost her loved one." Peres' official visit was the first to Romania by an Israeli president.

Nechushtan said:

Israel's airway routes are limited, and we are happy that other nations are opening their skies to us. Romania opened her skies to us, we are happy to train here. Over the years our partnership with Romania has developed into a friendship. I want to thank he Romanian air force and army for their assistance after the tragedy that occurred, and to assure them that our cooperation and partnership will continue.

In September 2011, IAF chief Major General Ido Nehushtan led a service with his Romanian counterpart in memory of those killed during the crash. In addition, Israeli Air Force officers, representatives from the Israeli Defense Ministry, and IDF rabbinate officials attended the memorial, which took place in Romania.

In November 2011, the Tel Nof base of the Israeli Air Force received an ancient 200-year-old Torah, one which had survived the Holocaust, as a donation from Romania's Jewish community in commemoration of the victims of the Sikorsky CH-53 crash. A special ceremony marked the occasion for the receiving of the scroll, which was found in Romania in the cellars of the previous Romanian leader Nicolae Ceaușescu.

A commentation ceremony was held on 10 June 2021 at the memorial site, attended by Romanian dignitaries, former Israeli president Reuven Rivlin and the commander of the Israeli air force Amikam Norkin

== See also ==
- List of accidents and incidents involving military aircraft (2010–2019)
