= AVIC Advanced Heavy Lifter =

Chinese large helicopter project

General information
- Type: Large transport helicopter
- National origin: China
- Manufacturer: Aviation Industry Corporation of China

The Advanced Heavy Lifter is a large helicopter project developed by Aviation Industry Corporation of China.

== Development ==
In 2009, Avic projected a 30 t (66,000 lb) civil Advanced Heavy Lifter (AHL), likely also useful to the Chinese military. In 2014, the 6,000 kW (8,000 hp) Chinese WZ-20 was reportedly selected. In 2015, the joint project with Russian Helicopters grew to 38.2 t (84,000 lb), with a seven blade main rotor and a 5,700 m (18,700 ft) ceiling. In 2016, Avic took control, leaving Russian Helicopters as a supplier, presumably of the transmission. In 2018, maximum weight grew again to 42 t (93,000 lb).

To power it, China will choose between the Ivchenko Progress D-136T manufactured by Ukraine's Motor-Sich, powering the current Mi-26, and the Russian 12,000 hp (8,900 kW) PD-12V turboshaft developed from the Aviadvigatel PD-14 core for an updated Mi-26. After a $2 billion investment, AVIC hopes to produce 200.

== Design ==
The 38.7 t (85,000 lb) takeoff weight and a 42 t (93,000 lb) MTOW allow for a 10 t (22,000 lb) internal payload or a 15 t (33,000 lb) external one. AVIC targets a range of 800 km (432 nmi), a cruise of 270 km/h (146 kn) and a 6,000 m (20,000 ft) ceiling. Design targets are closer to the Sikorsky CH-53K than the 56 t (123,000 lb) MTOW Russian Mil Mi-26. The 39.9 t (88,000 lb) CH-53K is the largest US helicopter.

== Specifications ==
Data from AIN online, 2018

General characteristics

- Capacity: 10 or 15 t (22,000 or 33,000 lb) internal or external payload
- Gross weight: 38,700 kg (85,319 lb)
- Max takeoff weight: 42,000 kg (92,594 lb)
- Powerplant: 2 × Motor-Sich D-136T or Aviadvigatel PD-12V turboshaft

Performance

- Cruise speed: 270 km/h (170 mph, 150 kn)
- Range: 800 km (500 mi, 430 nmi)
- Service ceiling: 6,000 m (20,000 ft)

== See also ==
Aircraft of comparable role, configuration, and era

- Mil Mi-26
- Sikorsky CH-53K
