= Bim (disambiguation) =

Bim is a 1975 film from Trinidad and Tobago.

Bim or BIM also may refer to:

== Places ==
- A nickname for the island of Barbados
- Bim, West Virginia, an unincorporated community in Boone County, West Virginia
- IATA code BIM for South Bimini Airport

== People and groups ==
- Bim (name)
- Bim (band), an early 1980s new wave band in which Cameron McVey and Stephen Street were members
- Bim (pop duo), London-based pop duo from Somerset
- Bim Bom, a Soviet circus clown duo consisting of Ivan Radunsky as Bim and various artists as Bom
- Roy Forbes (born 1953), Canadian musician who used to go by the stage name Bim
- Bim, a fictional character played by Frank Faylen in the 1945 film The Lost Weekend
- James May is addressed as Bim by RoBoHon, a robotic travel assistant, in the travel series James May: Our Man in Japan.

== Organizations ==
- Banca Intermobiliare, an Italian bank
- Bim (company), a Turkish retail store chain
- Bharathidasan Institute of Management, Tamil Nadu, India, a business school affiliated to Bharathidasan University
- Bord Iascaigh Mhara, the Irish Sea Fisheries Board
- British Institute of Management, London

== Science and technology ==
- BCL2L11, protein from Bcl-2 protein family produced by bim gene
- BiM, abbreviation for bimetal
- BiM, Binary MPEG format for XML
- Binary Independence Model, a probabilistic information retrieval technique
- Blade Inspection Method for helicopters
- Building Information Modeling, within construction, a process involving the generation and management of digital representations of physical and functional characteristics of buildings
  - Building Information Model, the resulting file from Building Information Modeling
  - CM-BIM, Certificate of Management - Building Information Modeling, a certification from the Associated General Contractors of America (AGC)

== Other uses ==
- Bahasa Isyarat Malaysia, or Malaysian Sign Language
- Bim, a colloquial name for trams in Vienna
- Bim (1950 film), a short film directed by Albert Lamorisse
- BIM (magazine), a Caribbean literary magazine founded in 1942 by Frank Collymore

== See also ==
- Brighton Institute of Modern Music, abbreviated BIMM
- "Hey Bim!", an episode of the travel documentary James May: Our Man in Japan
