= Sikorsky CH-53 Sea Stallion =

1964 transport helicopter family by Sikorsky

CH-53 Sea Stallion
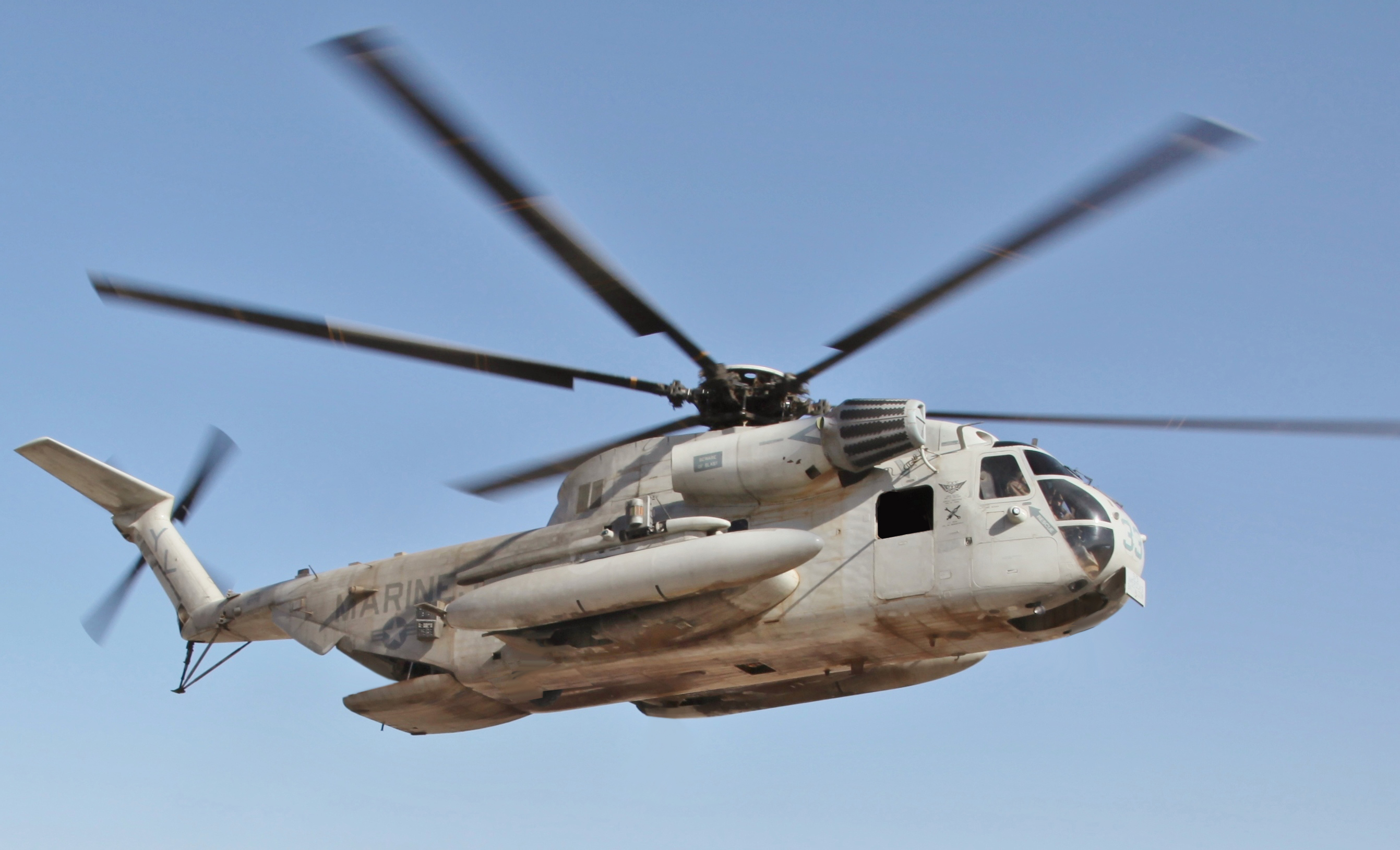
- A CH-53D Sea Stallion with HMH-362 lands on FOB Edinburgh, Helmand Province, Afghanistan

General information
- Type: Heavy-lift cargo helicopter
- National origin: United States
- Manufacturer: Sikorsky Aircraft
- Status: In service
- Primary users: United States Marine Corps (historical) German Air Force; Israeli Air Force; Mexican Air Force (historical)

History
- Manufactured: 1964–1978
- Introduction date: 1966
- First flight: YCH-53: 14 October 1964
- Retired: 2012 (USMC)
- Variant: HH-53 "Super Jolly Green Giant"/MH-53 Pave Low
- Developed into: Sikorsky CH-53E Super Stallion; Sikorsky CH-53K King Stallion

The CH-53 Sea Stallion (Sikorsky S-65) is a family of American heavy-lift transport helicopters designed and built by the American manufacturer Sikorsky Aircraft. The Sea Stallion was developed in response to a March 1962 request from the United States Navy's Bureau of Naval Weapons for a replacement for the Sikorsky CH-37 Mojave helicopters flown by the United States Marine Corps (USMC).

In July 1962, Sikorsky's proposal, which was essentially a scaled-up S-61R fitted with twin General Electric T64 turboshaft engines and the dynamic systems of the S-64/CH-54, was selected. On 14 October 1964, the YCH-53A performed its maiden flight; the first deliveries of production CH-53s to operational units commenced on 12 September 1966. In 1967, it first saw combat when it was deployed to the Vietnamese theater. The CH-53 quickly proved its value for moving heavy payloads, particularly in the recovery of damaged aircraft.

Several variants of the type were promptly introduced. The United States Air Force introduced the HH-53 "Super Jolly Green Giant", configured for special operations and combat search and rescue (CSAR) missions, during the latter part of the Vietnam War. The majority of these were rebuilt into the MH-53 Pave Low. The visually similar CH-53E Super Stallion is a heavier-lifting improved version of the rotorcraft, designated S-80E by Sikorsky. Its third engine makes it more powerful than the Sea Stallion and thus displaced it for the heavy-lift mission. Many early-build CH-53s were refitted with more powerful engines, while others were reconfigured for different mission roles, such as US presidential flights, training, and airborne mine countermeasures (AMCM) operations.

Several export deals for the CH-53 were made, leading to several international operators, including Germany, Iran, and Israel. Several unusual or high-profile operations have been undertaken, such as the capture and transportation of a Soviet advanced radar system to Israel under Operation Rooster 53 in 1969, and Iran's capture of five American CH-53s as a result of Operation Eagle Claw in 1980. Various operators deployed their CH-53s during international missions, often under the auspices of NATO or the United Nations, such as for UNSCOM in Iraq, in Kosovo with Kosovo Force (KFOR), Implementation Force (IFOR) in Bosnia and Herzegovina, and the International Security Assistance Force (ISAF) in Afghanistan. While several operators have opted to retain the type into the twenty-first century, many others have opted to supplement or withdraw their Sea Stallions in favor of other platforms, sometimes with the more powerful CH-53E. The CH-53 remains in service with German and Israeli forces, and is one of the largest military helicopters in service. Germany is planning to replace its fleet, as of the 2020s, with the latest version of the twin-rotor CH-47 Chinook. In US service, the CH-53 was replaced in some roles by the V-22 Osprey tilt rotor.

== Development ==
=== Origins ===
In 1960, the United States Marine Corps (USMC) began to seek a replacement for their HR2S piston-powered helicopters. In January 1961, the USMC began working with the U.S. Army, Navy, and Air Force on the "Tri-Service VTOL transport", which would eventually emerge as the LTV XC-142 tiltwing. The design became more elaborate and the program stretched out, causing the USMC to drop out when they decided they would not receive a working machine in a satisfactory timeframe. In particular, there were concerns that the high levels of downwash produced by the XC-142A would render shipborne operations impractical. In the end, the XC-142A, although a very innovative and capable machine, never entered production.

In March 1962, the United States Navy's Bureau of Naval Weapons, acting on behalf of the USMC, issued a request for a "Heavy Helicopter Experimental / HH(X)". The specifications dictated a load capability of 8,000 pounds (3,600 kg) with an operational radius of 100 nautical miles (190 km; 120 mi) at a speed of 150 knots (280 km/h; 170 mph). It was also specified to possess a higher top speed and greater lifting capacity than existing helicopters, while having a lower empty weight than preceding designs. The HH(X) was to be used in the assault transport, aircraft recovery, personnel transport, and medical evacuation roles. In the assault transport role, it was to be mostly used to haul heavy equipment instead of troops.

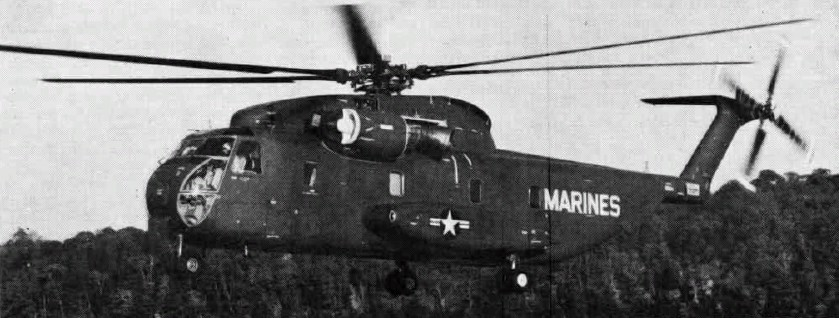
The YCH-53A prototype, 1964

In response, Boeing Vertol offered a modified version of the CH-47 Chinook. Kaman Aircraft offered a development of the British Fairey Rotodyne compound helicopter, and Sikorsky offered what amounted to a scaled-up version of the S-61R, with twin General Electric T64 turboshaft engines and the dynamic system of the S-64/CH-54, to be designated the S-65. Kaman's proposal quickly died when the British government dropped its backing of the Rotodyne program.

Competition between Boeing Vertol and Sikorsky was intense, with the Chinook having an advantage because it was being acquired by the United States Army. In July 1962, Sikorsky's bid was selected as the winner on account of various considerations, including cost, technical factors, and production capability. A contract was not immediately forthcoming due to budgetary limitations.

The USMC had originally sought to procure four prototypes. In light of funding shortfalls, Sikorsky, determined to keep the deal, reduced their estimate for the program's development costs by proposing that development could be performed with only two prototypes. Military officials favorably received the company's proposed reduction. In September 1962, Sikorsky was awarded a $9,965,635 (~$81.1 million in 2025) contract for the production of a pair of YCH-53A prototypes, as well as a mockup and a ground-test airframe.

The development program did not go entirely smoothly, due to a shortage of engineering resources plus various failures of subcontractors and the government, but these problems were gradually overcome. There was also pressure against the program from U.S. Secretary of Defense Robert S. McNamara, who promoted the concept of "commonality" between the armed services by adopting the Chinook instead. The USMC managed to convince McNamara's staff that the Chinook could not meet their requirements without numerous expensive changes.

The first YCH-53A performed its initial flight at the Sikorsky plant in Stratford, Connecticut, on 14 October 1964, about four months behind schedule. In September, the USMC had already placed an initial production contract for 16 helicopters. Flight trials went more smoothly than expected, helping make up for the time lost in development. In November 1964, the type was formally introduced to the general public. Around this time, it received the military designation and name CH-53A Sea Stallion. In September 1966, the first deliveries of the CH-53 to an operational unit occurred.

=== Further development ===
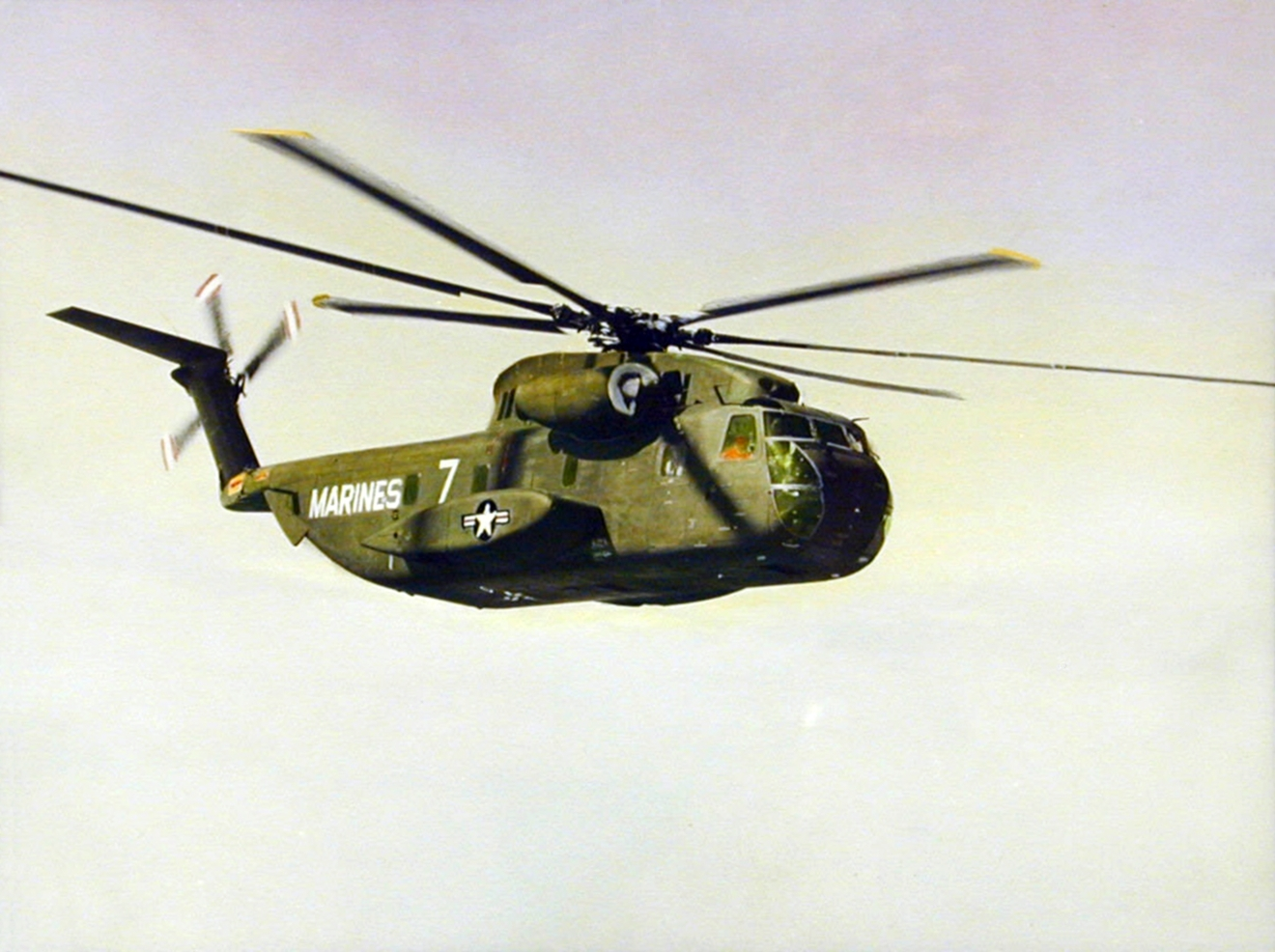
A USMC CH-53A

In January 1967, the CH-53A arrived in Vietnam and proved useful, eventually recovering more downed aircraft than the CH-54. 141 CH-53As were built, including the two prototypes. The U.S. Navy acquired 15 CH-53As from the USMC in 1971 for airborne mine countermeasures (AMCM) activities. The helicopters had more powerful T64-GE-413 turboshafts installed and received the designation RH-53A.

The United States Air Force ordered the HH-53B in September 1966 and it first flew in March 1967. It added a refueling probe, drop fuel tanks, a rescue hoist, and featured upgraded T64-GE-3 engines. The Air Force used the HH-53B for combat search and rescue (CSAR). HH-53C was an improved CSAR variant with a smaller 450 US gallons (1,700 L) fuel tank in exchange for more armor and better communication systems. The CH-53C was similar except it lacked a refueling probe. It was used by the USAF for more general transport work.

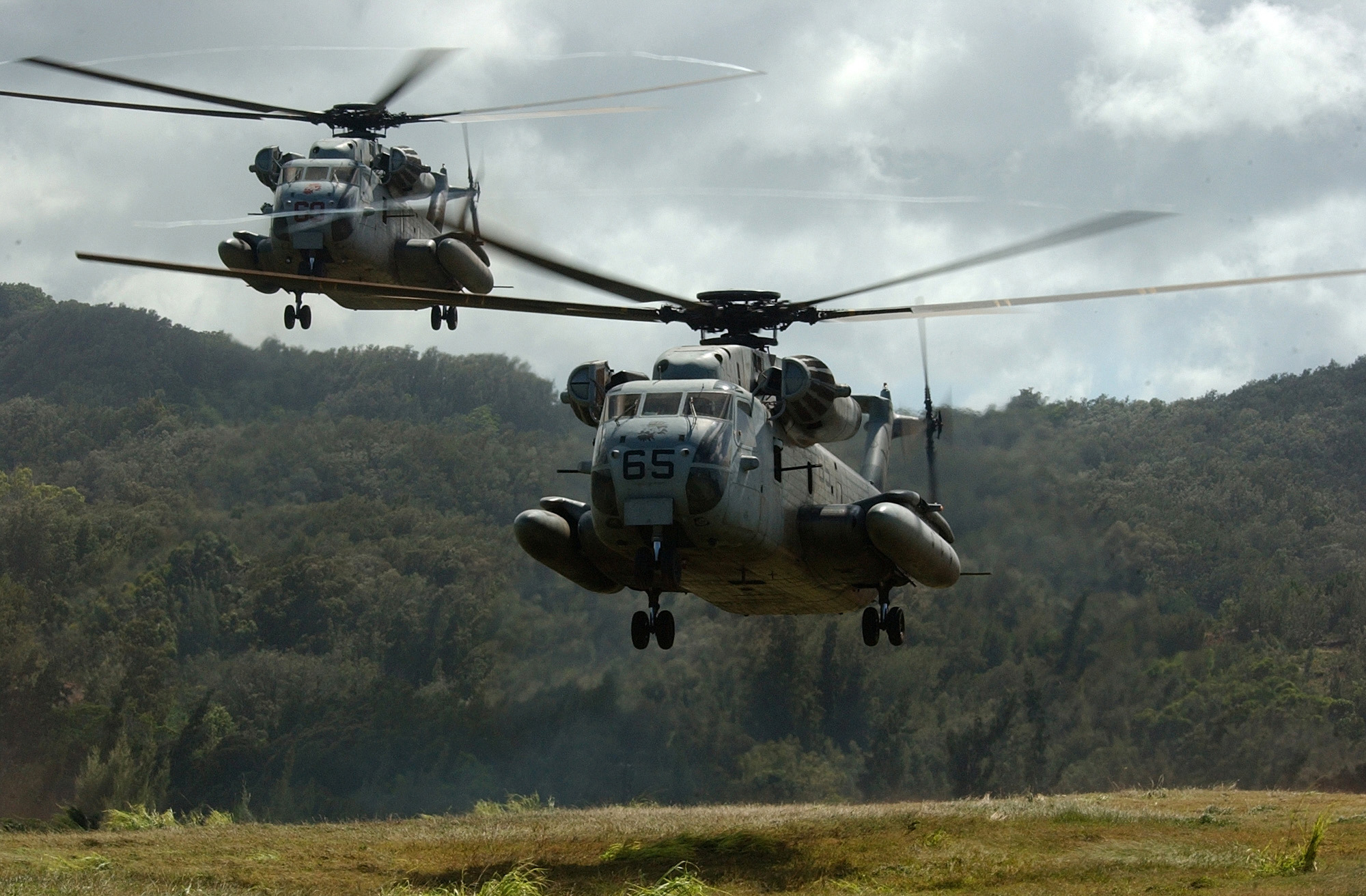
HMH-362 CH-53Ds landing

Heavy lifting in tropical climates demanded more power, so the USMC decided to acquire an improved variant, the CH-53D, with uprated engines, originally the T64-GE-412, then later the T64-GE-413. The CH-53D included an uprated transmission to go with the more powerful engines, and a revised interior to permit a load of 55 troops.

The initial flight of the CH-53D was in January 1969. The CH-53D served alongside the CH-53A through the rest of the Vietnam War. A VIP transport version designated VH-53D with plush accommodations was used by the USMC for US presidential flights. The US Navy also acquired CH-53D-based helicopters for minesweeping. These were designated RH-53D and included mine sweeping gear such as a pair of 0.50 BMG (12.7 mm) Browning machine guns for detonating mines. The Navy received 30 RH-53Ds, beginning in 1973. After the RH-53Ds were in service, the RH-53As were handed back to the USMC and restored to CH-53A configuration.

In the 1980s, Israeli Air Force's CH-53 Yas'ur fleet was upgraded by Israel Aircraft Industries and Elbit Systems. The project – which ended in 1997 – improved the CH-53 avionics, robustness and extended its life span by at least two decades.

In 1989, some of the CH-53As being retired by the USMC were passed on to the U.S. Air Force for training, with these helicopters redesignated TH-53As. The TH-53As were stripped of most operational equipment and painted in USAF camouflage colors.

== Design ==
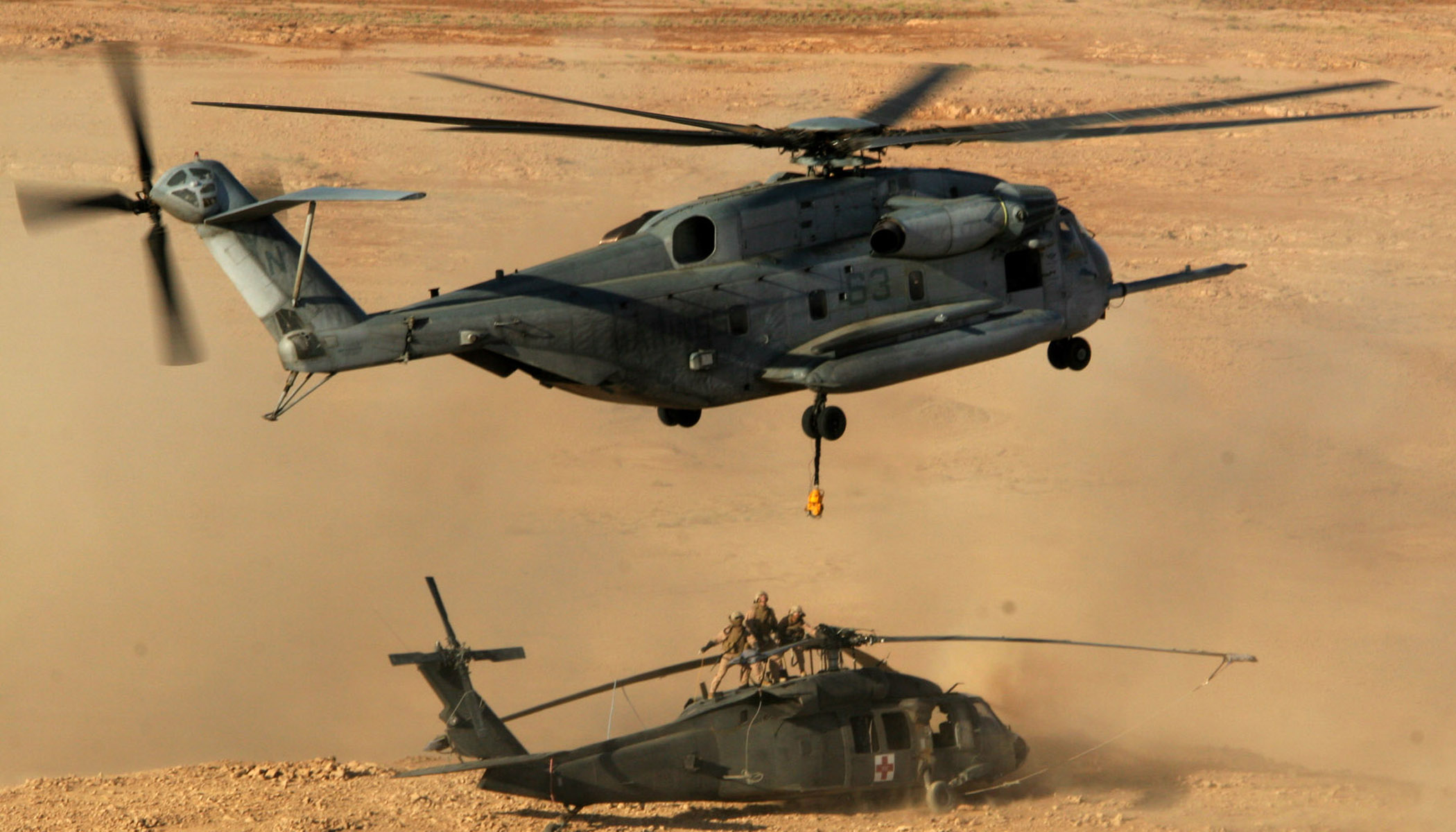
A CH-53E Super Stallion recovers a disabled UH-60 in Iraq

The Sikorsky CH-53 Sea Stallion is a heavy lift military transport helicopter. The CH-53A carries a crew of four; pilot, copilot, crew chief, and an aerial observer. It can carry various payloads, including up to 38 fully-equipped troops, 24 litters with medical attendants, an internal cargo load of 8,000 pounds (3,600 kg), or an external load of 13,000 pounds (5,900 kg) on the single-point sling hook. Access to the main cabin is via the large passenger door on the right side of the fuselage behind the cockpit, as well as by a power-operated loading ramp to the rear. This loading ramp was capable of facilitating drive-on loading operations, enabling quicker cargo movements. The CH-53A was designed to have a useful payload capacity, in terms of weight, of almost half of the rotorcraft's empty weight.

It is provisioned with mechanical flight controls, which are backed by three independent hydraulic systems. As noted by Sikorsky engineer Edward S Carter Junior, the rotorcraft could be equipped to facilitate all-weather operations. It shares a somewhat similar fuselage design, albeit on a substantially larger scale, with the Sikorsky S-61R series. While the Sea Stallion's fuselage is watertight, the helicopter is not intended for amphibious use and its ability to land on water is meant to only be used in emergency situations.

To save space, which is normally at a premium on board most naval vessels, both the tail boom and the rotors can be folded while the helicopter is stowed; to reduce the workload involved in this process, an automated folding system was developed by Sikorsky. Both the crew and vital systems are protected by armoring across key areas. All of the fuel was housed within sponsons on either side of the fuselage. The CH-53A was typically equipped with a pair of 7.62×51mm NATO M60 machine guns that point out to each side of the fuselage.

The CH-53A features a fully-articulated six-bladed main rotor and four-bladed tail rotor. According to Carter, the relatively high speed requirement stipulated by the USMC was the primary factor shaping the dynamic design. While the Sea Stallion's dynamic systems were largely derived from those used on the earlier Sikorsky S-64 Skycrane, substantial reengineering were also involved due to the vastly different operating requirements. Extensive use of titanium was made across its dynamic components, particularly for elements that may have been susceptible to degradation over time due to metal fatigue. Initially, the CH-53 was powered by a pair of General Electric T64-6 turboshaft engines, each of which provided up to 2,850 shaft horsepower (2,130 kW). These engines were located on the upper fuselage. Later engines included the T64-1, capable of generating up to 3,080 shp (2,300 kW), and the T64-16, which was rated for up to 3,485 shp (2,599 kW). The HH-53B model featured T64-3 engines, which produced up to 3,080 shp (2,300 kW).

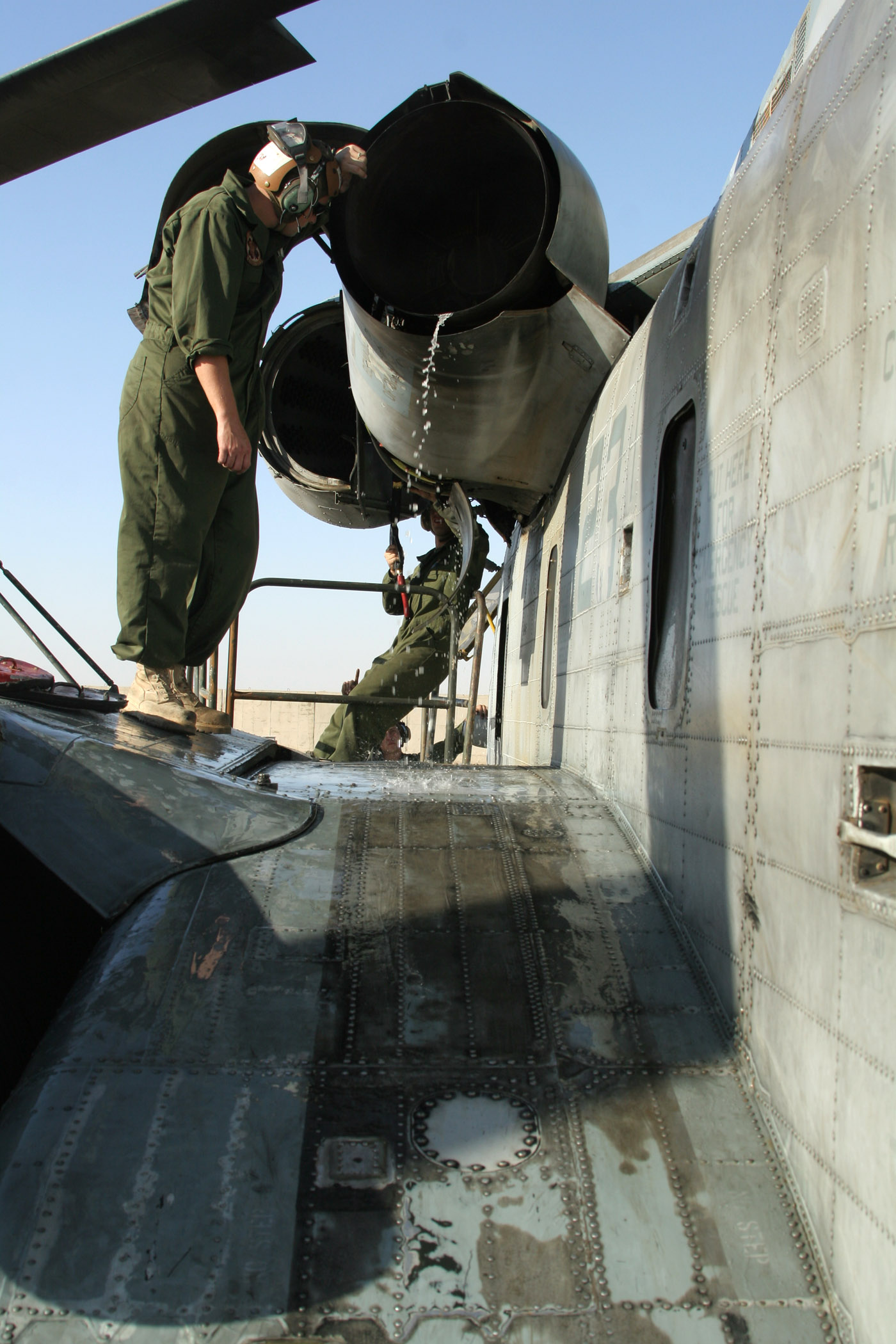
CH-53D engine maintenance

The improved CH-53D features uprated engines, initially using the T64-GE-412 that could provide up to 3,695 shp (2,755 kW), then the T64-413 with its further elevated output of 3,925 shp (2,927 kW); these more powerful engines necessitated the use of an uprated transmission. Interior changes included additional seats, which allowed for up to 55 troops to be carried at a time. The CH-53D is generally armed with twin .50 BMG (12.7 mm) M2/XM218 machine guns. During the type's later years of service, it has become commonplace for CH-53Ds to have been retrofitted with various defensive countermeasures; such apparatus has often included an AN/ALE-39 chaff dispenser and an AN/ALQ-157 infrared countermeasure.

Later production CH-53Ds featured a Blade Inspection Method (BIM) scheme to detect cracks in its metal rotors. BIM involved pressurizing the interior of the rotor blades with nitrogen. If a crack is present pressure is lost and a red indicator on the rotor blade tip was tripped. Later, the BIM system was connected to a cockpit display. BIM reduced the need to routinely swap rotor blades.

== Operational history ==
=== United States ===
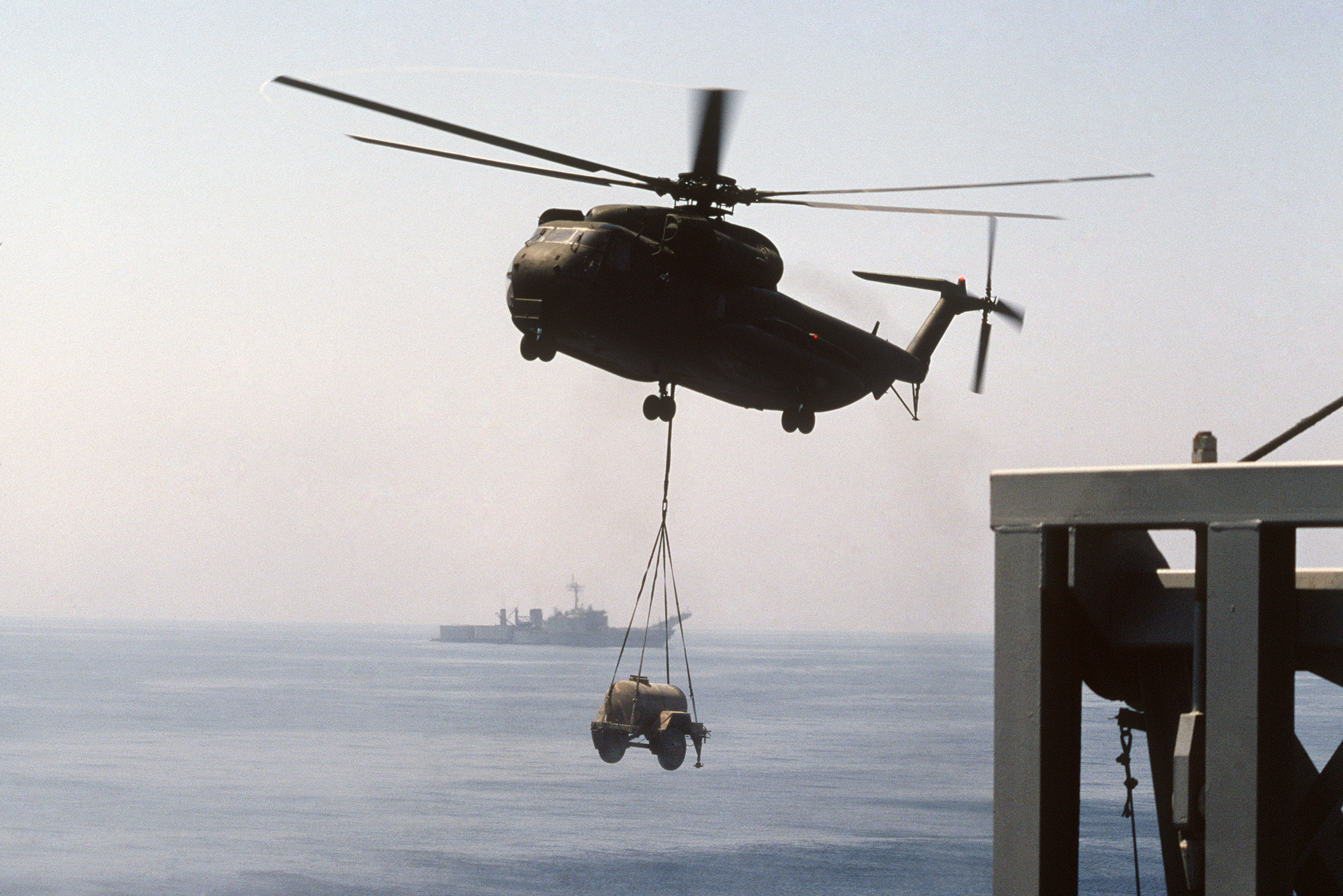
A Sea Stallion during the BRIGHT STAR '85 exercise

The CH-53/HH-53 has seen considerable use in warzones and served in various conflicts during its service. It was first used in the Vietnam War, often recovering downed aircraft and evacuating personnel. The CH-53D served alongside the CH-53A through the latter portion of the US's presence in Vietnam. Both types played a critical role at the end of the conflict, performing evacuations of personnel during Operation Frequent Wind.

Between 1967 and 1975, U.S. Air Force HH-53 Super Jolly Green Giants were the primary search-and-rescue helicopter in Southeast Asia. They inserted the Operation Ivory Coast rescue team into the North Vietnamese prison camp at Son Tay in 1970, and carried the USMC and Air Force Security Forces who attempted to rescue the crew of SS Mayagüez. Marine-flown Navy Sea Stallions were the rotary-wing element of Operation Eagle Claw, the attempted rescue of American hostages in Iran in 1980 that ended in disaster and embarrassment at "Desert One". In 1983, Marine CH-53s were used in Grenada during Operation Urgent Fury.

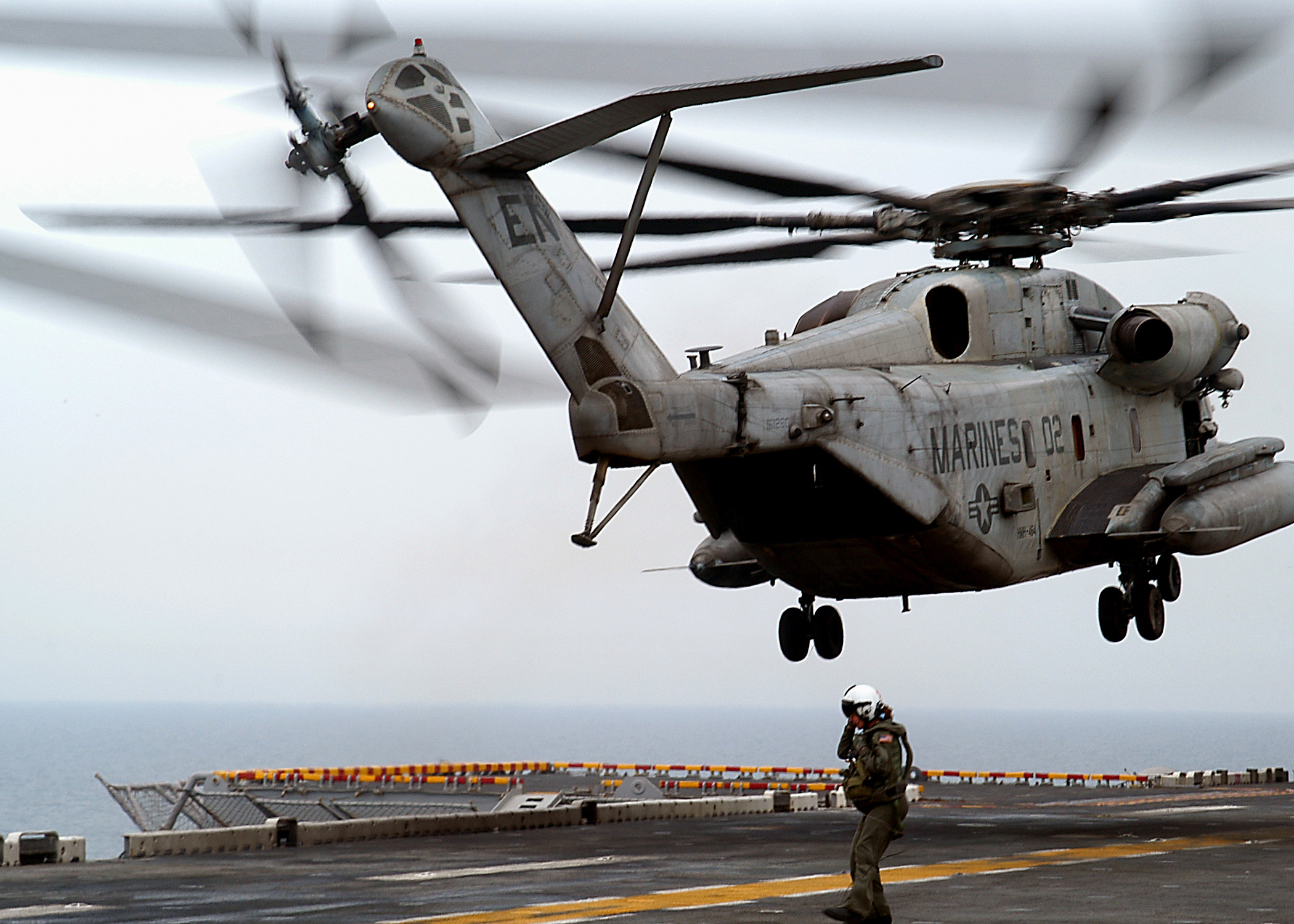
A CH-53E Super Stallion landing on a ship, 2003

The CH-53 was operated by the Air Force, Marine Corps and Navy in support of Operation Iraqi Freedom. It was operated by all three services in support of Operation Enduring Freedom in Afghanistan. It was in the Afghan theatre than the final operational missions of the CH-53D fleet were performed in February 2012.

In September 2007, VMM-263 of the USMC was deployed with ten MV-22B Ospreys, a tiltrotor aircraft. The V-22 has been the primary replacement for the USMC's fleets of CH-53Ds and CH-46E Sea Knights, but not the more powerful CH-53Es. Instead, the in-development CH-53K is planned to supplant the Navy and USMC CH-53E fleets.

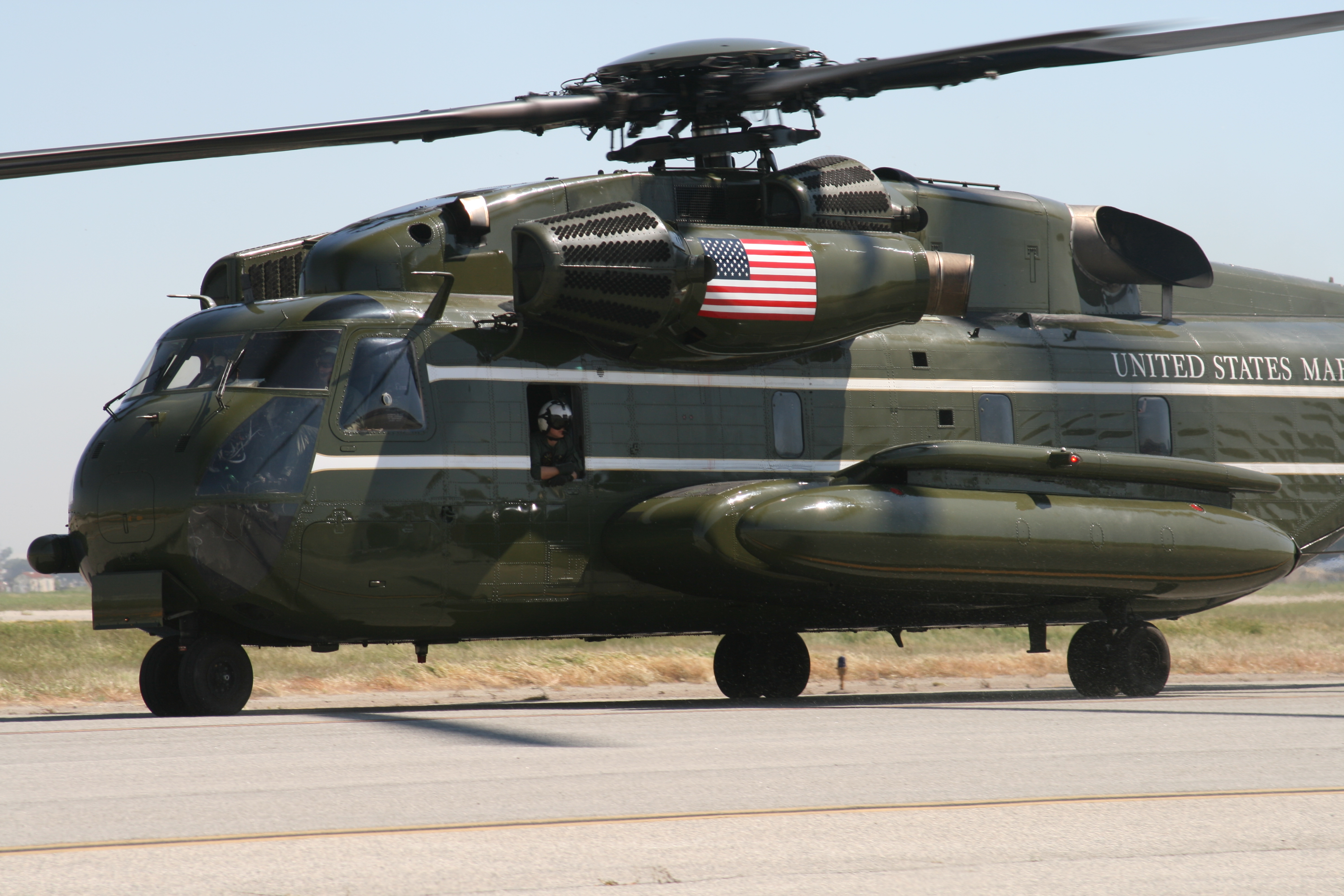
A CH-53E as Marine One, 2009

In September 2011, HMH-463 replaced its CH-53Ds with CH-53Es. HMH-363 and HMH-362 are to operate D-models until the squadrons are deactivated. Both units are to be reactivated as MV-22 and CH-53K squadrons respectively. Several CH-53D helicopters will be retained for the 3rd Marine Regiment for training. HMH-362 retired the last CH-53Ds after its combat deployment in August 2012 and decommissioned in November 2012.

=== Israel ===
In August 1968, an Israeli Air Force (IAF) delegation visited Sikorsky's Connecticut plant while seeking information to select the service's next assault helicopter. The delegation was looking for a helicopter with augmented payload carry capacity, highly maneuverable and robust, that could survive direct hits from different caliber projectiles. They examined Boeing's CH-47 Chinook and Sikorsky's CH-53. The Sikorsky's CH-53 was both larger and stronger than any of the IAF's other helicopters, and represented a major advancement in terms of capability. Based upon experience gained from the intense combat of the then-recently fought Six-Day War, the delegation opted for the CH-53.

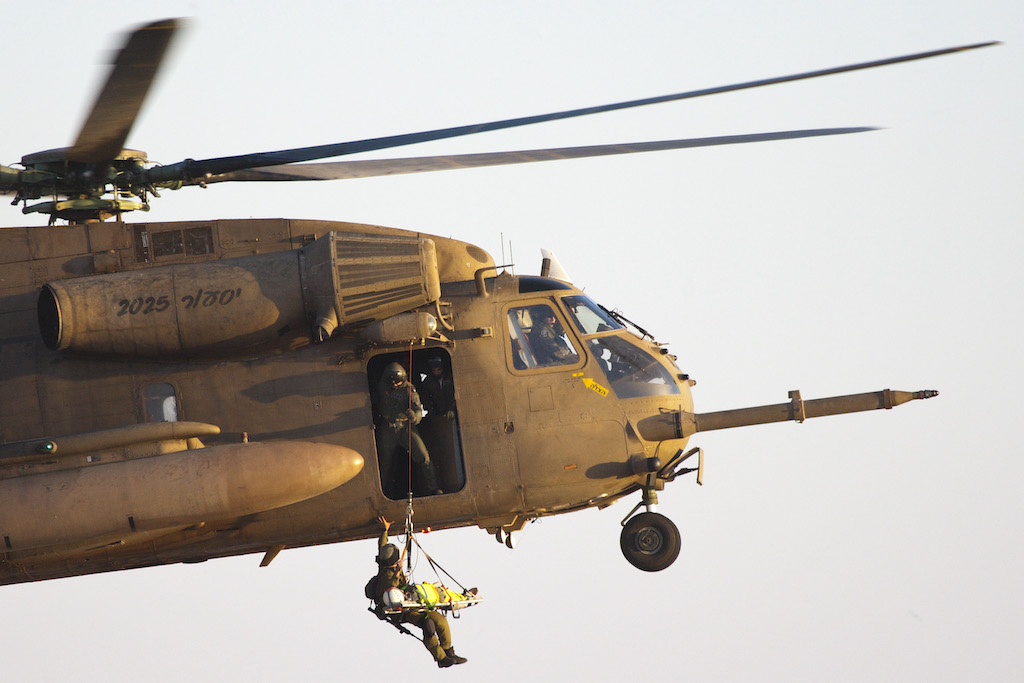
An Israeli Air Force CH-53 Yas'ur 2025 lifting a Unit 669 soldier with a stretcher

On 2 October 1969, the first S-65C-3 (CH-53D) helicopters were delivered to Israel, of an initial order of seven. At the time, Israel was engaged in the War of Attrition, and the type was quickly dispatched into combat. Receiving the Hebrew name Yas'ur (Petrel), a further 35 helicopter were delivered to fulfil subsequent orders. In August 1970, the first Yas'ur squadron was established. For several decades, the type has served as the primary cargo helicopters of the IAF, being routinely used to carry both troops and heavy equipment.

In 1969, during the War of Attrition, IAF CH-53s landed in Egypt and conveyed a captured Soviet advanced radar system back to Israel for examination by Israeli scientists and engineers, during Operation Rooster 53. The Yas'ur was used in other capacities during the conflict, including the retrieval of a navigator from a downed IAF F-4 Phantom II under sustained enemy fire on 30 June 1970.

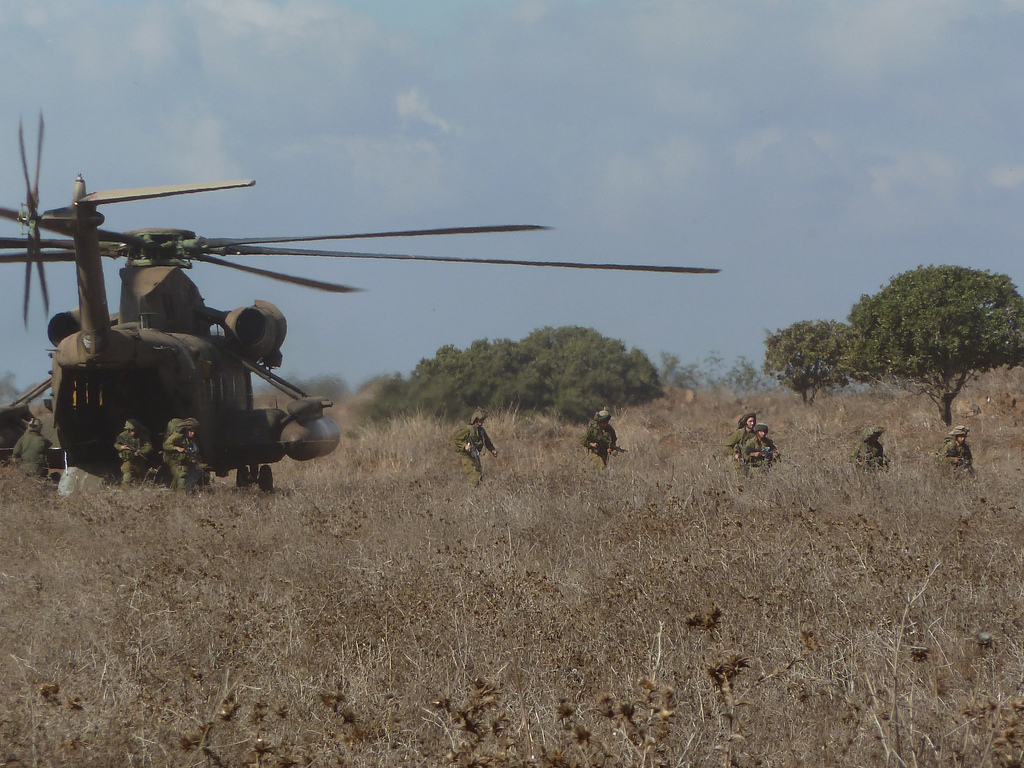
Israel Defense Forces Iron Trails Reconnaissance Company troops exit a CH-53 during an exercise

During the 1973 Yom Kippur War, the Yas'ur routinely moved artillery batteries and inserted IDF units around the fronts. The type evacuated hundreds of wounded soldiers and rescued pilots from behind enemy lines in Egypt and Syria. In one engagement, a single Yas'ur was attacked by multiple aircraft, including a pair of MiG-21s. While sustaining damage, it was still able to return to base. Since 1973, Yas'urs have been used by the IDF to land and extract Sayeret commandos on raids and patrols deep behind enemy lines in Lebanon Syria and the greater Middle East.

In the 1980s, Israel Aircraft Industries, along with Elbit Systems, commenced a major upgrade program for the IAF Yas'ur fleet. The project, which was completed in 1997, improved the CH-53's avionics and increased its robustness, and extended the fleet's operating life by at least two decades.

Several Yas'urs performed firefighting operations on and around the 1989 Mount Carmel forest fire. They performed dozens of low flyovers into the smoke and flames, dumped 700 tons of water on the fire, and doused it. On 8 November 1992, a pair of CH-53s performed one of the IAF's longest-distance sea rescue operations to retrieve passenger from the distressed yacht Fantasy 2 off the coast of Sudan.

During the 2006 Lebanon War, Hezbollah shot down an Israeli CH-53 Yas'ur with an anti-tank missile, killing five air crew members. This was reportedly the only combat loss of an Israeli CH-53 during the conflict.

On 16 August 2012, the IAF temporarily grounded its CH-53 fleet following one having experienced in-flight difficulties that led to an emergency landing. Initial reports state the issue was related to the rotor blades. The fleet was again grounded for three weeks after a CH-53 was destroyed by a fire during a training exercise. The IAF attributed this loss to a defective component and blamed Lockheed Martin for failing to communicate the issue.

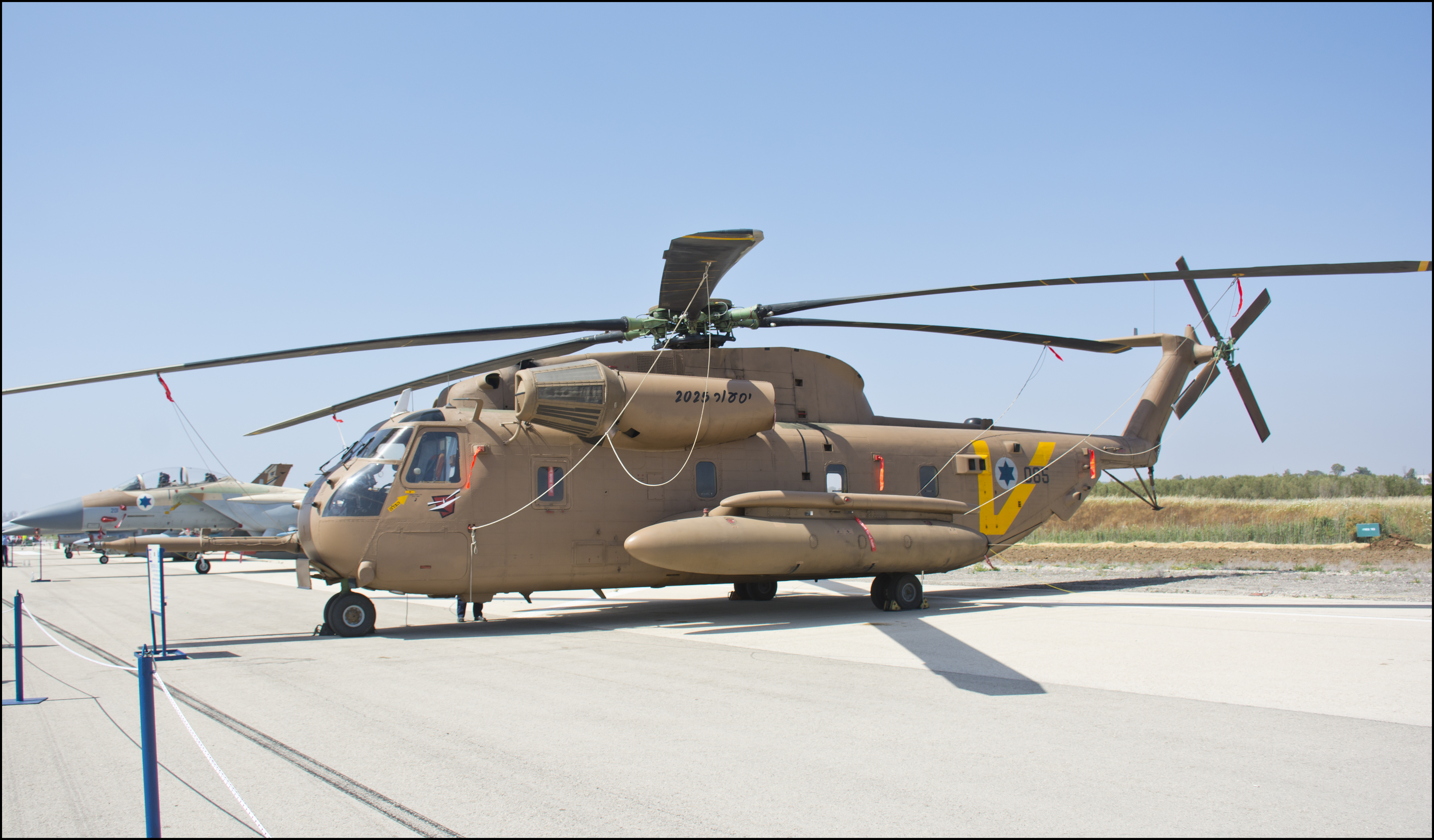
An IAF CH-53-2025 Yas'ur on display at Tel-Nof airbase, during Israel's 69th Independence Day in 2017

In 2015, it was announced that Israel planned to withdraw the last of its Yasurs around 2025. Replacement options studied included the CH-53K and the CH-47F Chinook, with a prospective order for approximately 20 helicopters being placed for the preferred option. In February 2021, the Israeli Ministry of Defense announced the selection of the CH-53K to replace the Yasur fleet.

On 7 October 2023, during the first day of the Gaza war, and the first time since the 2006 Lebanon War in a similar incident, Hamas shot down an IAF CH-53 with a Kornet anti-tank missile and hit its left engine, while it was carrying about 50 paratroopers, a very unusual procedure, as opposed to the approved IAF's max capacity of 33 troops. The pilot managed to land safely in an open field, offloading both the aircrew and the paratroopers. The CH-53 was then hit by a second anti-tank missile, completely destroying the helicopter. The occupants survived the attack with minor to medium injuries.

=== Iran ===
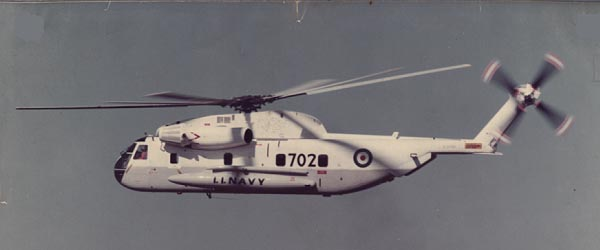
An Iranian Sea Stallion in the 1970s

In the 1970s, an initial fleet of six RH-53D Sea Stallions was delivered to the Imperial Iranian Navy (IIN). Following the Iranian Revolution in 1979, the Sea Stallions continued in service with the renamed Islamic Republic of Iran Navy (IRIN). These were supplemented by five U.S. Navy examples that were abandoned during Operation Eagle Claw in 1980. Despite US sanctions that have blocked Iran from acquiring spares and support from overseas, Iran has reportedly been able to keep at least a portion of their Sea Stallions in an operational condition. This effort has been aided by illegal exports of controlled parts to Iran by US citizens.

=== Germany ===
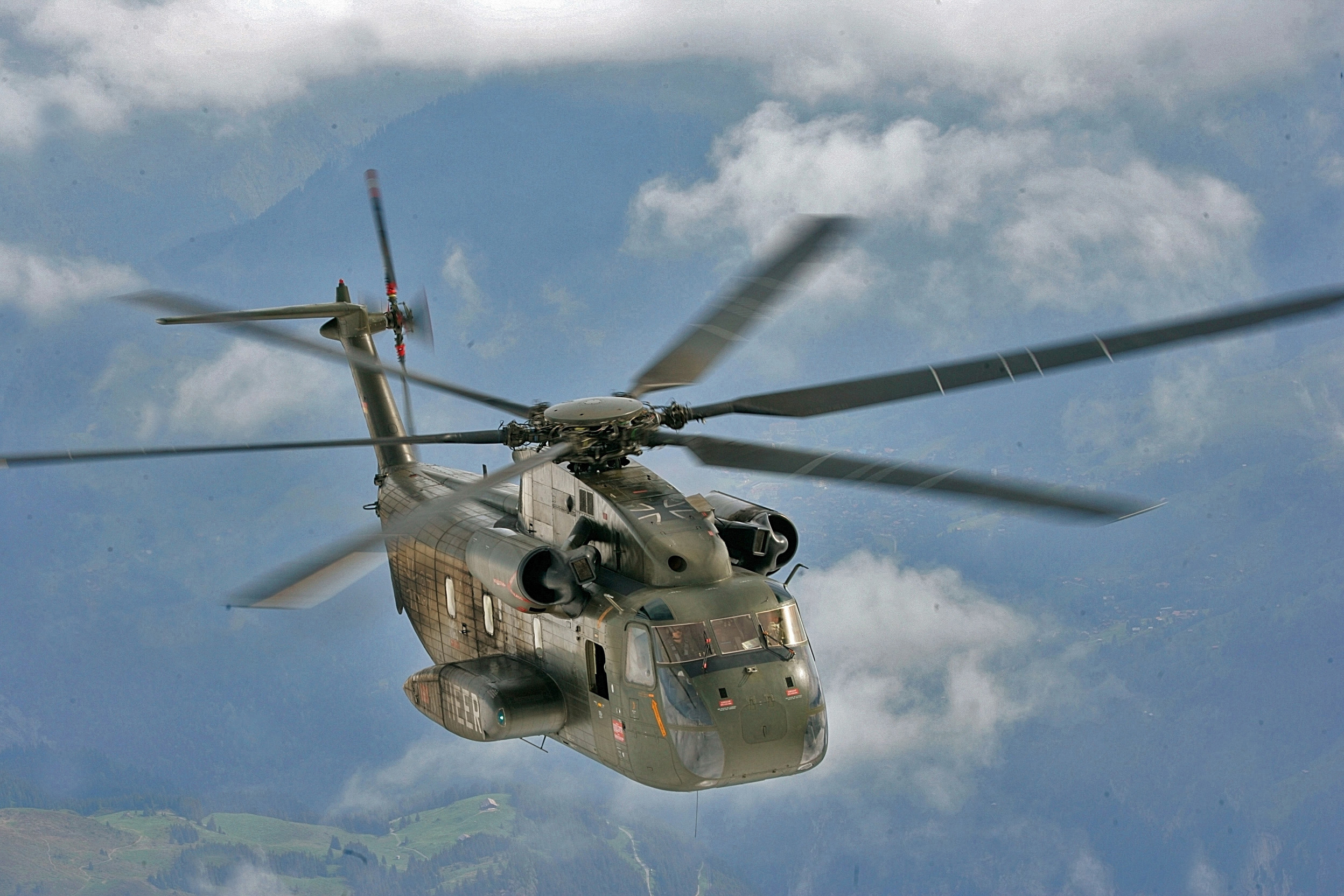
A Heer CH-53G flying in the Alps, 2005

In 1966, the German military evaluated the CH-53 and CH-47 as a replacement for the H-21 and H-34G helicopters, with an initial requirement for 133. In June 1968, the purchase of the CH-53 was approved, but due to budget constraints only 110 were ordered. Following the delivery in 1969 of two pre-production helicopters from Sikorsky, the production aircraft were licence built by VFW-Fokker at Speyer in Germany. The first German-built CH-53G Mittlerer Transporthubschrauber helicopter flew from Speyer in October 1971 and was delivered to the Erprobungsstelle der Bundeswehr 61 flight test center at Manching in December 1971.

Between 1971 and 1975, the German Army Aviation Corps received 110 type CH-53Gs, derivatives of the CH-53D. 108 helicopters were built in Germany by VFW-Fokker. The first flight by a German CH-53G was made in 1971, followed in March 1973 by the delivery of the first machines to Heeresfliegerregiment (HFlgRgt, Army Aviation Corps Regiment) 35 in Mendig, and shortly afterwards to the newly formed Army Aviation Corps Regiment 15 based at Rheine and Army Aviation Corps Regiment 25 based at Laupheim.

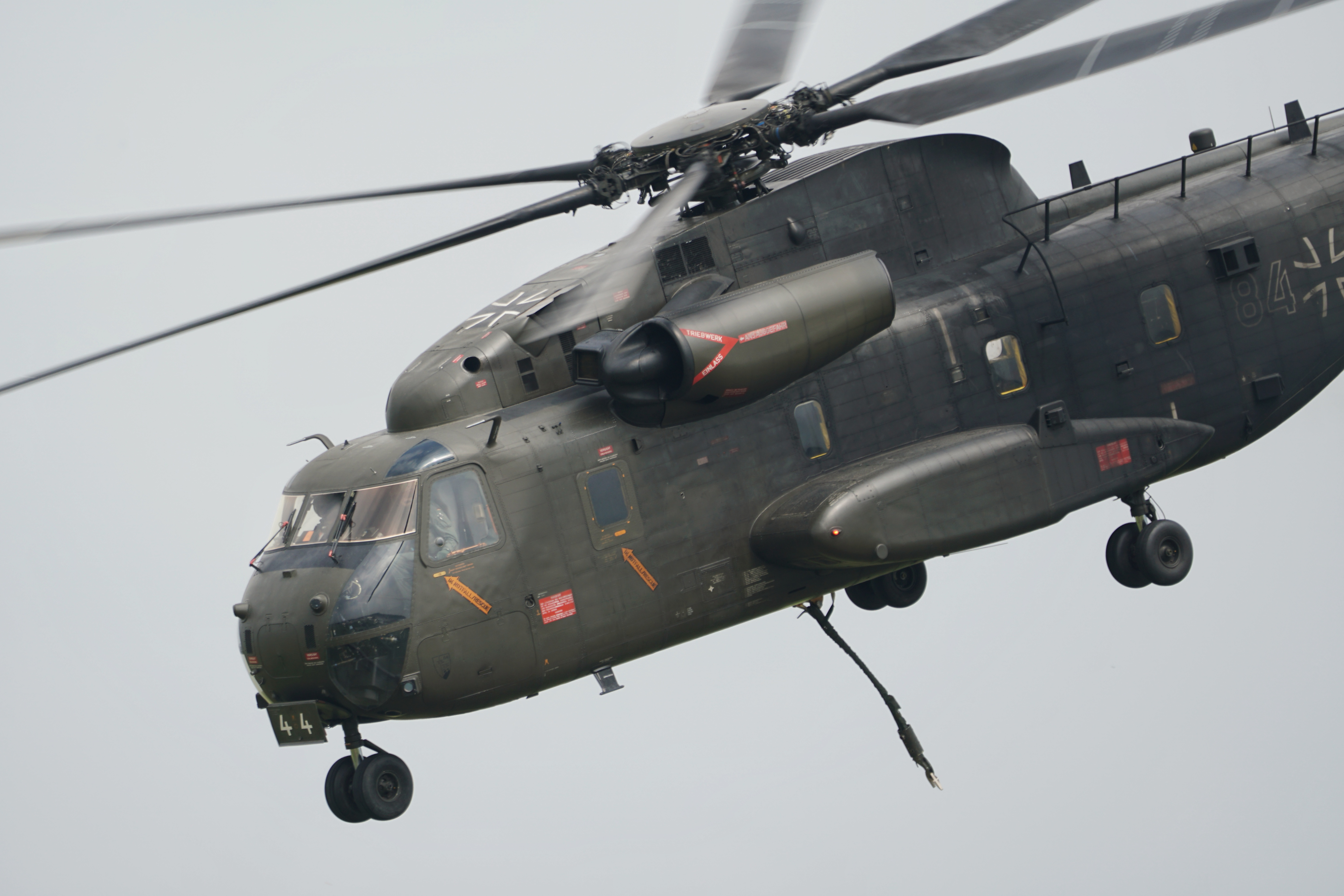
A Bundeswehr CH-53G, 2019

From 1990, to meet ever more demanding specifications, over time the CH-53G received modifications designed to improve its service life and operational capabilities. These involved three major upgrades: new missile warning and self-protection systems; provision for two external fuel tanks allowing range to be increased to 1,100 mi (1,800 km) when carrying 36 armed soldiers or a 12,100 lb (5,500 kg) payload; and a night vision goggles-compatible cockpit for night low-level flying capabilities. All CH-53Gs were upgraded by Eurocopter Germany by early 2001, resulting in updated GS/GE/GA variants.

As a result of foreign military operations, 20 CH-53G helicopters were converted to perform Combat Search and Rescue (CSAR) missions. Version CH-53GS is equipped with modernized IFR equipment, additional exterior fuel tanks, low-flight night vision cockpit and NVG, partial ballistic protection, engine dust collectors, missile counter measure and self-defence armament. The original engines were replaced by the more powerful T64-100 engines.

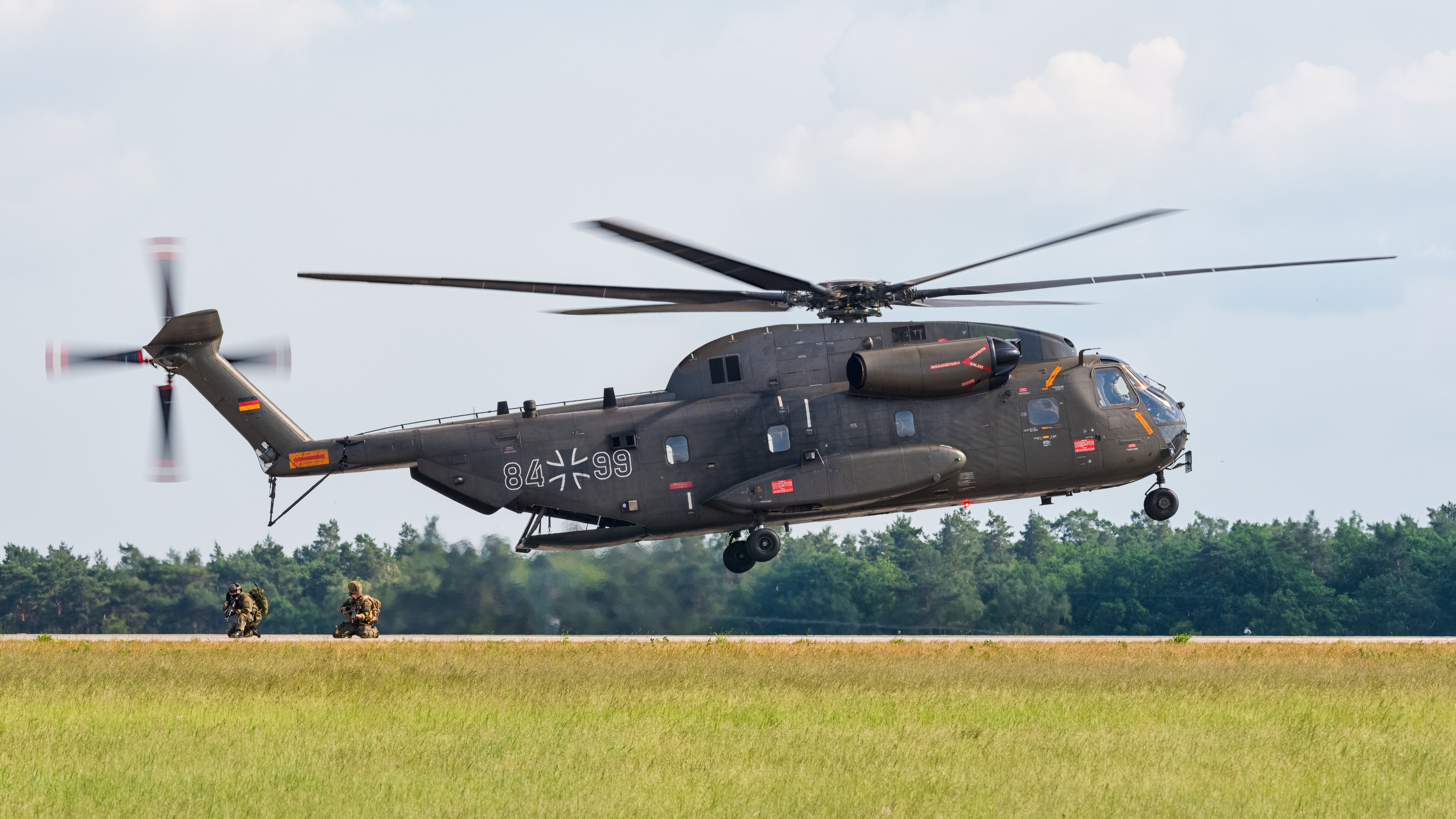
A German Army CH-53G at ILA, 2016

German Army Aviation Corps units have carried out a wide range of international missions under the auspices of NATO and the UN, providing transport for members of UNSCOM in Iraq, serving in Kosovo with KFOR, with IFOR in Bosnia and Herzegovina, and more recently with ISAF in Afghanistan. In January 2013, all Army Aviation Corps CH-53Gs were transferred to the German Air Force and incorporated into Helicopter Wing 64.

In the 2010s, Germany was reportedly considering options for replacing its aging CH-53G fleet, with candidates including the Chinook and the CH-53K model. In September 2020, the German Ministry of Defense cancelled the "Schwerer Transporthubschrauber" (STH) heavy-lifting helicopter program for 45 to 60 helicopters, after the initiative was judged to be too expensive and stated that its CH-53Gs fleet would be replaced following a period of reexamination. In 2022, the Federal Government announced that all of Germany's CH-53s would be replaced by 60 CH-47Fs.

=== Austria ===
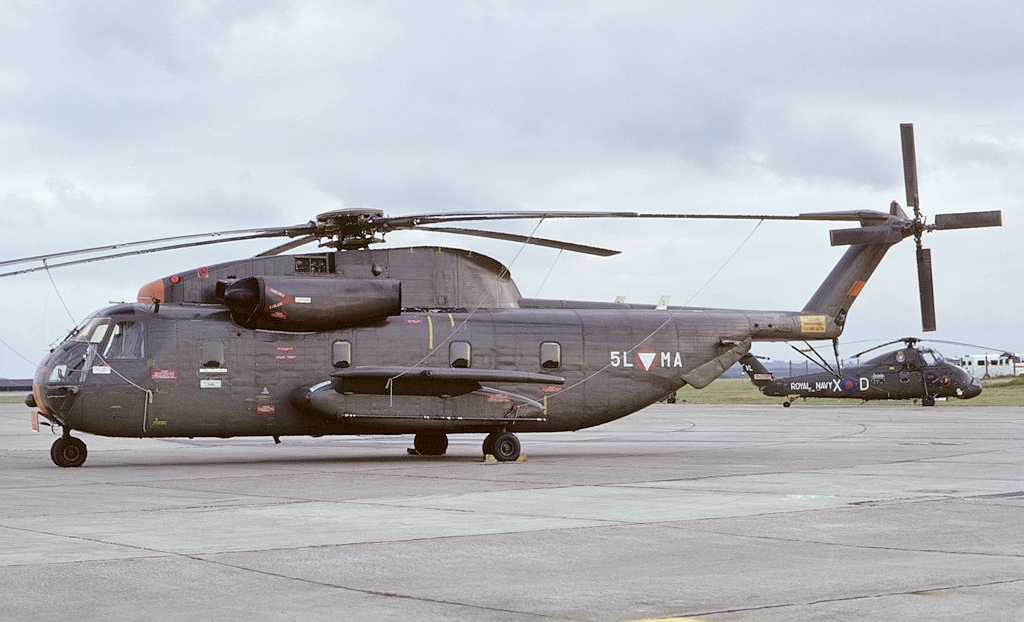
A S-65Ö of the Austrian Air Force parked at RAF Greenham Common in 1974

In 1970, a pair of S-65C-2 or S-65Ö (equivalent to the CH-53D standard, albeit without the aerial refuelling probe) helicopters were delivered to Austria. Intended primarily to perform airborne rescue operations in the Alps, they were assigned to 1st Helicopter Wing of the Austrian Air Force, making the service the second foreign operator of the CH-53. Their equipment included same rescue hoist as the HH-53 and fittings for auxiliary fuel tanks and accommodation for 38 passengers.

Although they performed well in high altitude operations, the type's relatively high operating costs were a major contributing factor in Austria's decision to sell both rotorcraft to Israel in 1981. However, since the 1999 Galtür avalanche, in which over 7,000 thousand people were transported by an international collaboration of helicopter resources from Austria, USA, German, France, and Switzerland including 50 helicopters, more helicopter resources have been pursued.

=== Mexico ===
In 2003, the Fuerza Aérea Mexicana (FAM) acquired four surplus CH-53D Sea Stallions from Israel at a combined cost of $25 million (~$41.9 million in 2025). Prior to their delivery in 2005, all helicopters were upgraded to the Yasur 2000 standard. Due to restricted budgets, only two were actually operated by 104th Air Squadron, while the other pair served as a source of spare parts. Their initial missions were troop transport and commando insertion. Their principal mission changed to performing rescue and disaster relief operations, being relocated to BAM 8 at Yucatán. By 2013, all examples had been permanently withdrawn from service.

=== Civil use ===
In 2007, the first commercially owned CH-53D was being converted by the Californian company Heavy Lift Helicopters into a firefighting configuration, which was referred to by the firm as the Fire Stallion. Having acquired a batch of six ex-military CH-53Ds, the company planned to make them available for hire by other operators. In addition to fire-fighting, construction work and general transport duties were envisioned for the fleet. While the fleet reportedly flew for a handful of years, they entered storage after a short period due to component shortages.

== Variants ==
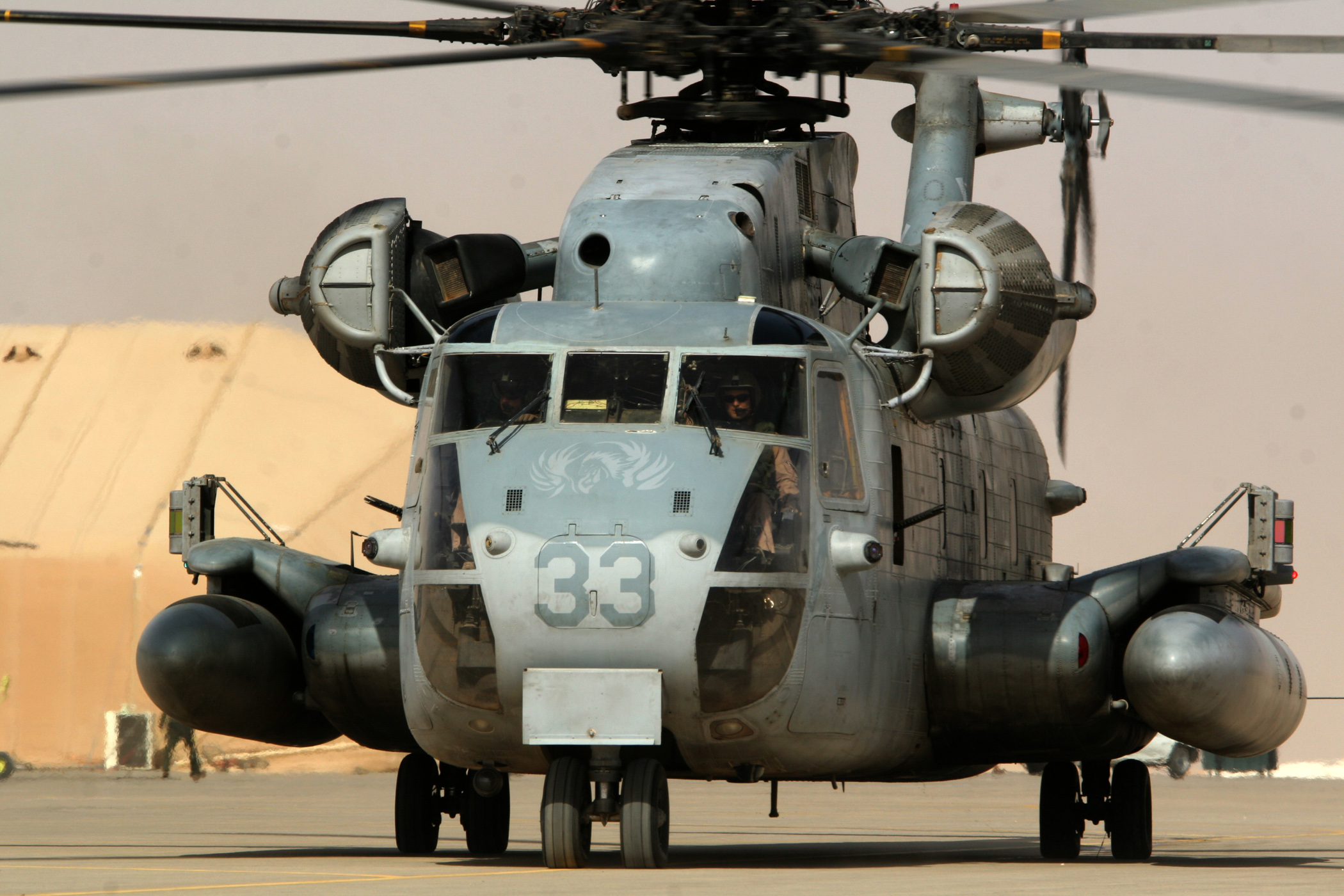
A USMC CH-53D taxiing at Al-Asad Airbase, Iraq, June 2006

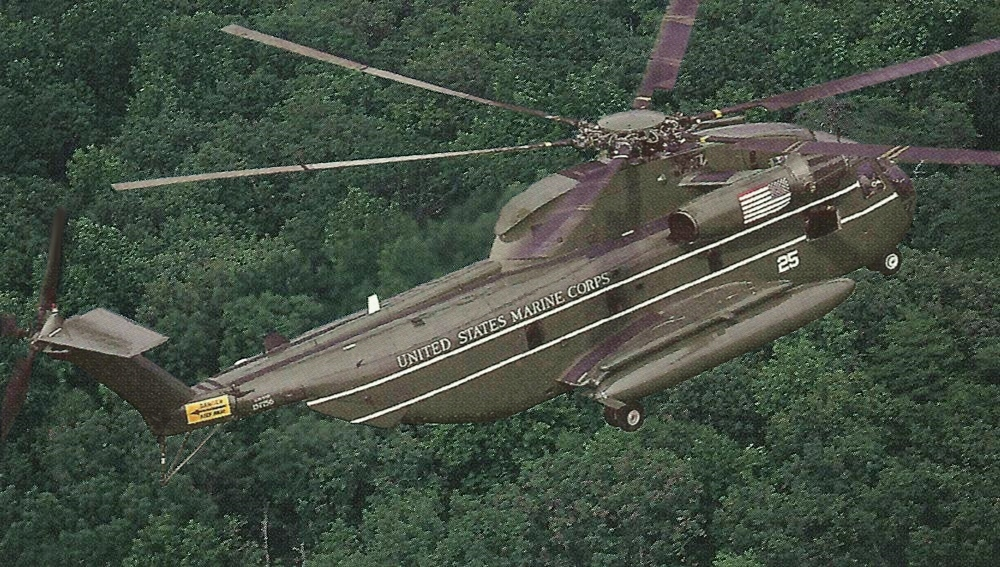
A USMC VH-53D used by HMX-1

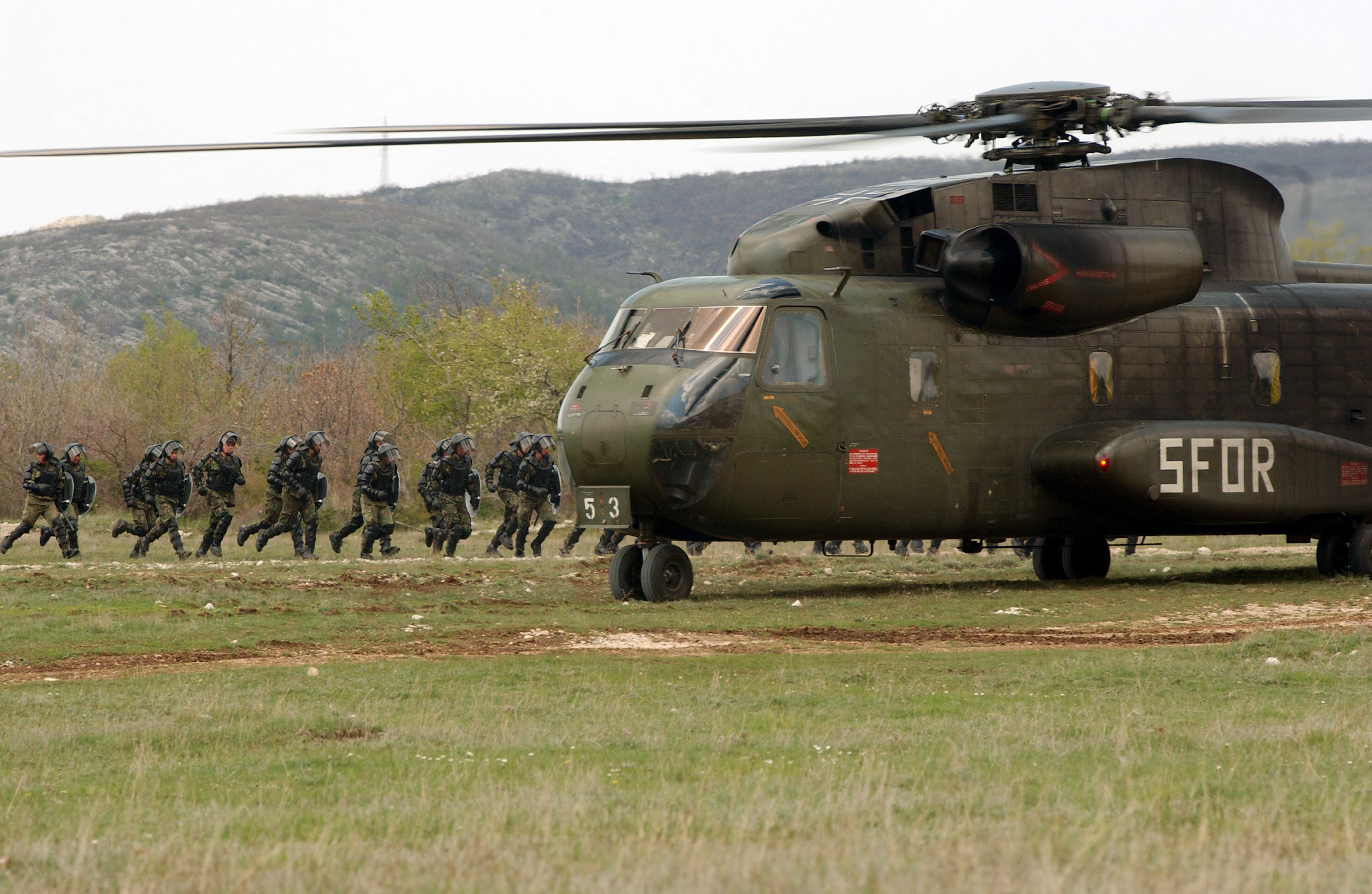
A CH-53G of the German Army Aviation Corps during an exercise in Bosnia, April 2002

YCH-53A
Two prototypes with two 2,850 shp (2,130 kW) T64-GE-3 engines.

CH-53A
Initial production variant for the USMC. 139 built.

RH-53A
CH-53A re-engined with two 3,925 shp (2,927 kW) T64-GE-413 engines as Airborne Mine CounterMeasures (AMCM) variants for the United States Navy. 15 conversions.

TH-53A
Stripped CH-53As used for training by the United States Air Force.

CH-53D
CH-53A with an improved transmission, larger cabin for 55 troops and automatic rotor blade folding for the United States Marine Corps, 126 built.

RH-53D
United States Navy AMCM variant of the CH-53D, fitted with 0.50-inch caliber machine guns and provision for air refueling. 30 built for the USN. Six examples were exported to Iran, before the 1979 Iranian Revolution. This version can carry 25,000 lb (11,340 kg) of cargo with cargo hook.

VH-53D
Four modified CH-53Ds for USMC VIP transport.

VH-53F
Six unbuilt VIP helicopters for the US Navy/Marine Corps.

CH-53G
German base version of the CH-53D for the German Army Aviation Corps. The internal Sikorsky designation was S-65C-1. A total of 112 were produced including 2 pre-production and 20 assembled by VFW-Fokker and 90 built by Speyer. As of 2007, 89 German CH-53s were in service, with 80 planned to be in service in 2014. All German CH-53s are going to receive T64-100 engines. All will receive IFR-capability.

CH-53GS
Update of 20 CH-53Gs in the late 1990s, with additional missile counter measure, upgraded communication and navigation system and two external fuel tanks added. They later received the first batch of T64-100 engines to operate in hot and high conditions that prevail in Afghanistan. MG3 and M3M machine guns were also fitted. A CH-53GS/GE update has also been ordered to provide combat search-and-rescue (CSAR) capability to 26 helicopters.

CH-53GE
A configuration based on CH-53GS combat search-and-rescue (CSAR) capabilities. The upgrade configuration was formerly known as CH-53GSX. It further updates with modern electronics, two external fuel tanks, counter measures and dust filters for the engines. Upgrade was ordered to support Afghanistan deployment.

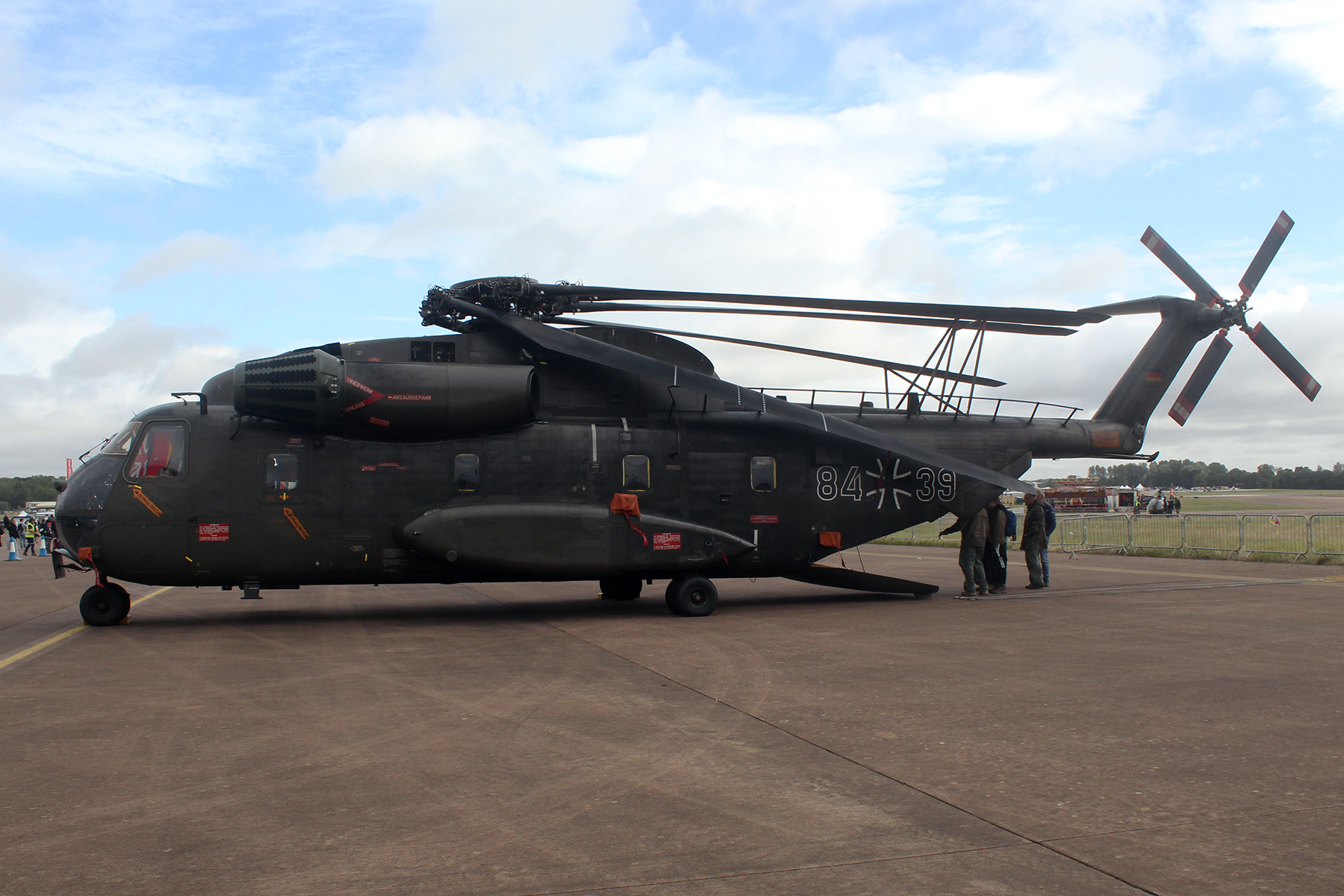
CH-53GA at the 2023 Royal International Air Tattoo

CH-53GA
Update of further 40 CH-53Gs with new flight deck, new flight control system, autopilot, navigation and communication systems, FLIR, ECM and missile counter measures as well as provisions for additional internal fuel tanks. The CH-53GA helicopter successfully completed its first flight in February 2010. The upgrade was completed by 2013.

S-65Ö
Export version of the CH-53D for the Austrian Air Force. Internal Sikorsky designation was S-65C-2. 2 were built, subsequently sold to Israel.

S-65C-3
Export version of the CH-53D for the Israeli Air Force. The Yas'ur 2000 version are helicopters upgraded and improved by the Israel Aircraft Industries to extend life span past 2000. The Yas'ur 2025 is a further upgraded version with new systems and new gearboxes. Israel completed the upgrade by 2015 and currently operates 21 Yas'urs as of November 2023.

== Operators ==
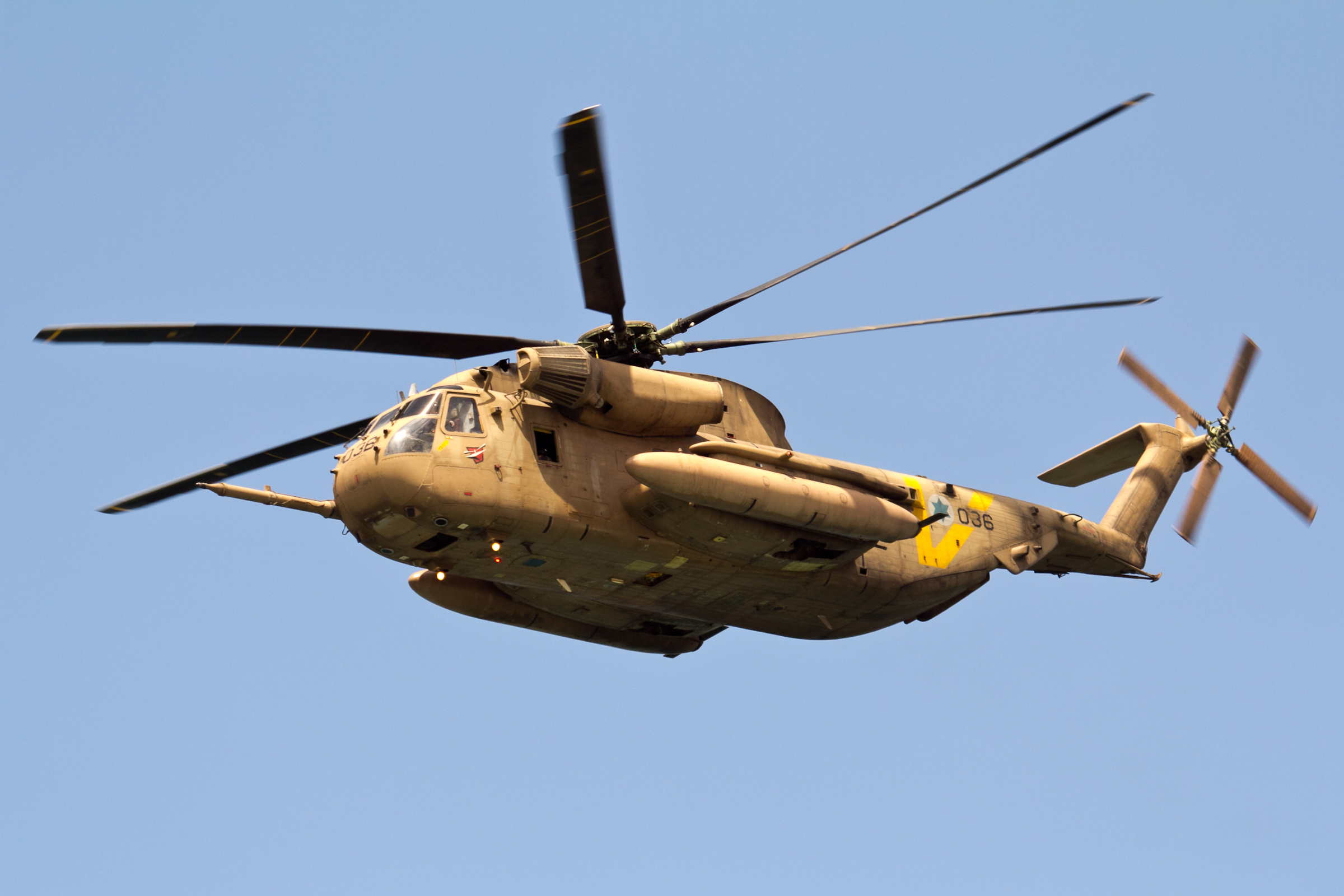
A CH-53-2000 Yas'ur (S-65C-3) of the Israeli Air Force during Israel's 65th Independence Day flypast in 2013

Germany

- German Air Force
  - Helicopter Wing 64

Iran

- Islamic Republic Iranian Navy

Israel

- Israeli Air Force
  - 118 Squadron "Night Birds", 1970–present

=== Former operators ===
Austria

- Austrian Air Force 1970–1981 (sold to Israel)

Germany

- German Army Aviation Corps
  - Medium Transport Helicopter Regiment 15 Münsterland, 1971–2012 (disbanded)
  - Medium Transport Helicopter Regiment 25 Oberschwaben, 1971–2012 (initially disbanded, later reformed in 2013 as Helicopter Wing 64 in the German Air Force)

Mexico

- Mexican Air Force
  - 104th Air Squadron, 2003-2013 (all CH-53s withdrawn from service)

Israel

- Israeli Air Force
  - 114 Squadron "Night Leaders", 1969–2023 (temporarily inactive, pending reactivation in 2025 while converting to CH-53K King Stallion)

United States

- United States Air Force (see MH-53 Pave Low)
- United States Marine Corps
  - HMH-361 "Flying Tigers", 1977–1990 (converted to CH-53E Super Stallion, 1990–present)
  - HMH-362 "Ugly Angels", 1969-2012 (Last operational CH-53D Sea Stallion squadron)
  - HMH-363 "Lucky Red Lions", 1969-2012 (converted to MV-22 Osprey, 2012–present)
  - HMH-366 "Hammerheads", 1994–2000 (converted to CH-53E Super Stallion, 2008–2022)
  - HMH-461 "Ironhorse", 1966–1988 (initially converted CH-53E Super Stallion, 2008–2022; subsequently converted to CH-53K King Stallion, 2022–present)
  - HMH-462 "Heavy Haulers", 1965–1992 (converted to CH-53E Super Stallion, 1992–present)
  - HMH-463 "Pegasus", 1966-2011 (converted to CH-53E Super Stallion, 2012-2022)
  - HMH-769 "Titan", 1971–1990 (initially converted to RH-53D Sea Stallion, 1990–1996; later converted to CH-53E Super Stallion, 1996–2008; subsequently will be converted to CH-53K King Stallion in 2026)
  - HMH-772 "Hustlers", 1971–2000s (converted to CH-53E Super Stallion, 2000s–present)
  - HMH-777 "Flying Armadillos", 1971-1980 (was reformed in 1980 as HMH-772 Detachment B until 1993, and was then consolidated with HMH-769)
  - HMHT/HMT-301 "Windwalkers", 1968-1983, 1995-2005 (trained aircrews and technicians on CH-53A/D, converted to CH-53E Super Stallion 1983-1993, reactivated as training unit on CH-53D in 1995 until inactivation in 2005)
  - HMHT/HMT-302 "Phoenix", 1987–1995 (trained aircrews and technicians on the CH-53A/D until 1995, today only trains on the CH-53E Super Stallion, 1987–present)
  - HMX-1 "Nighthawks", 1972-2004 (Four VH-53D Sea Stallion supported US Presidential Executive Flight Detachment, converted to VH-53E Super Stallion which served into 2011)
- United States Navy (All remaining USN RH-53D Sea Stallions were transferred to the USMC in 1993 and all AMCM USN HM units had converted to the MH-53E Sea Dragon by 1995)
  - HM-12 "Sea Dragons", 1971-1994 (reestablished 2015-present with MH-53E Sea Dragon)
  - HM-14 "Vanguard", 1978-1989 (converted to MH-53E Sea Dragon 1989-2023)
  - HM-15 "Blackhawks", 1993-1994 (established in 1987 as an MH-53E squadron; supported HM-19 as Det. 3 or "Pink Det." integration from RH-53D to MH-53E Sea Dragon)
  - HM-16 "Seahawks", 1978-1987 (was exclusively an RH-53D squadron)
  - HM-18 "Norsemen", 1986-1995 (RH-53D squadron that integrated with HM-14 with MH-53E Sea Dragon)
  - HM-19 "Golden Bears", 1988-1993 (RH-53D squadron that integrated with HM-15 with MH-53E Sea Dragon)

== Aircraft on display ==
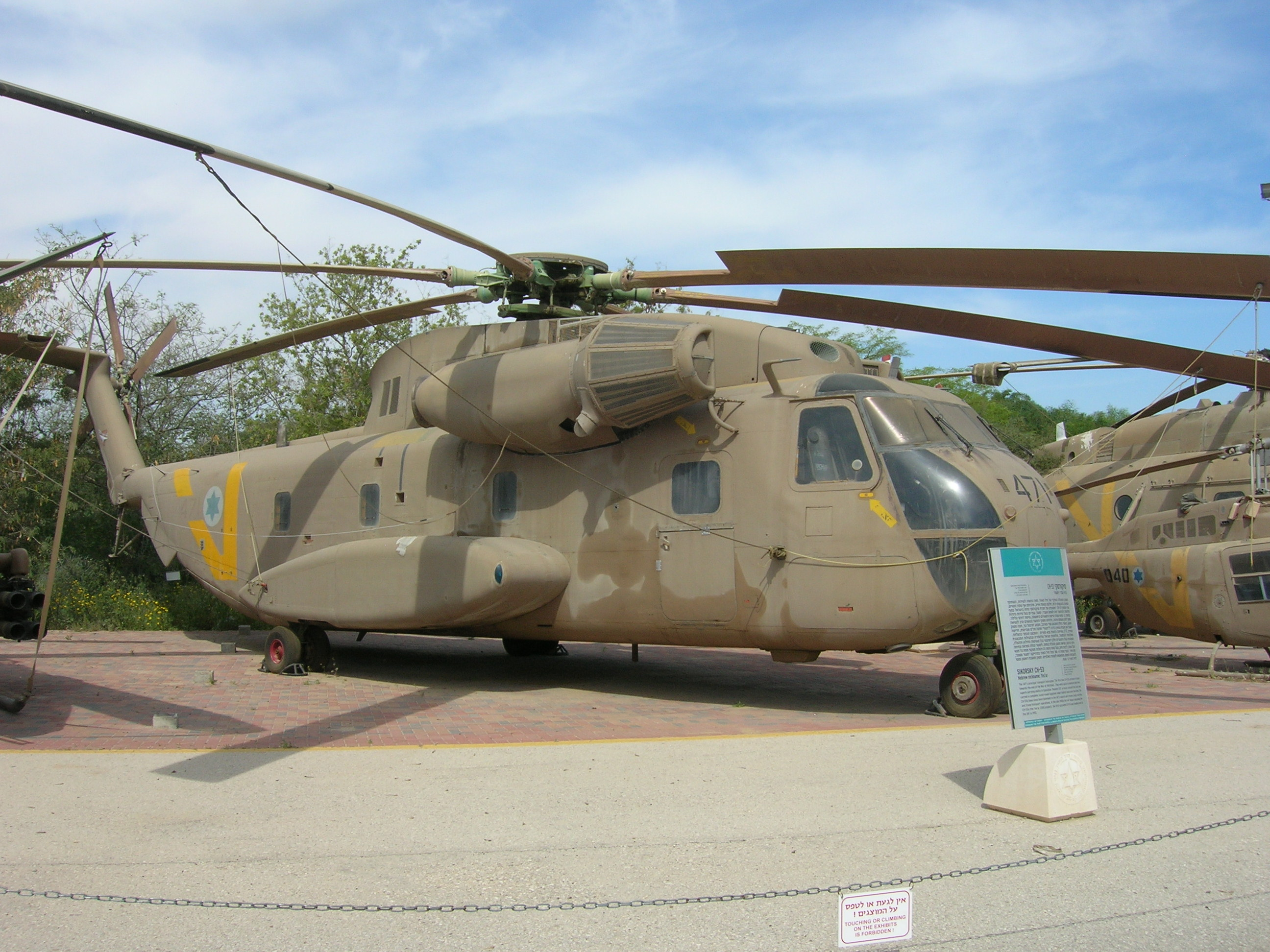
A CH-53A Yas'ur at the Israeli Air Force Museum

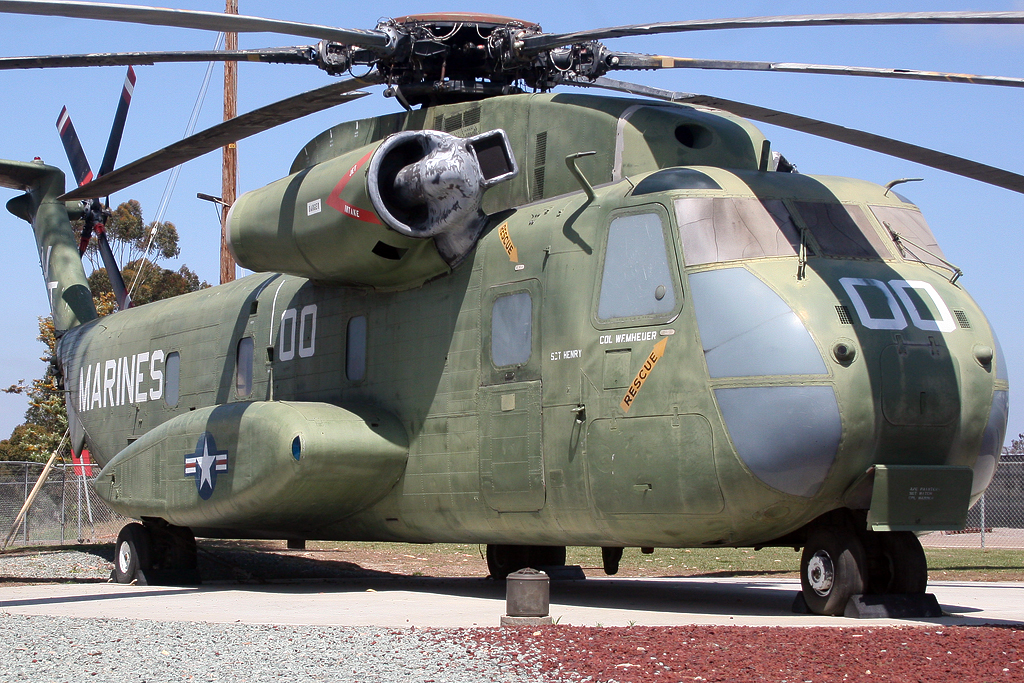
A CH-53A at the Flying Leatherneck Aviation Museum

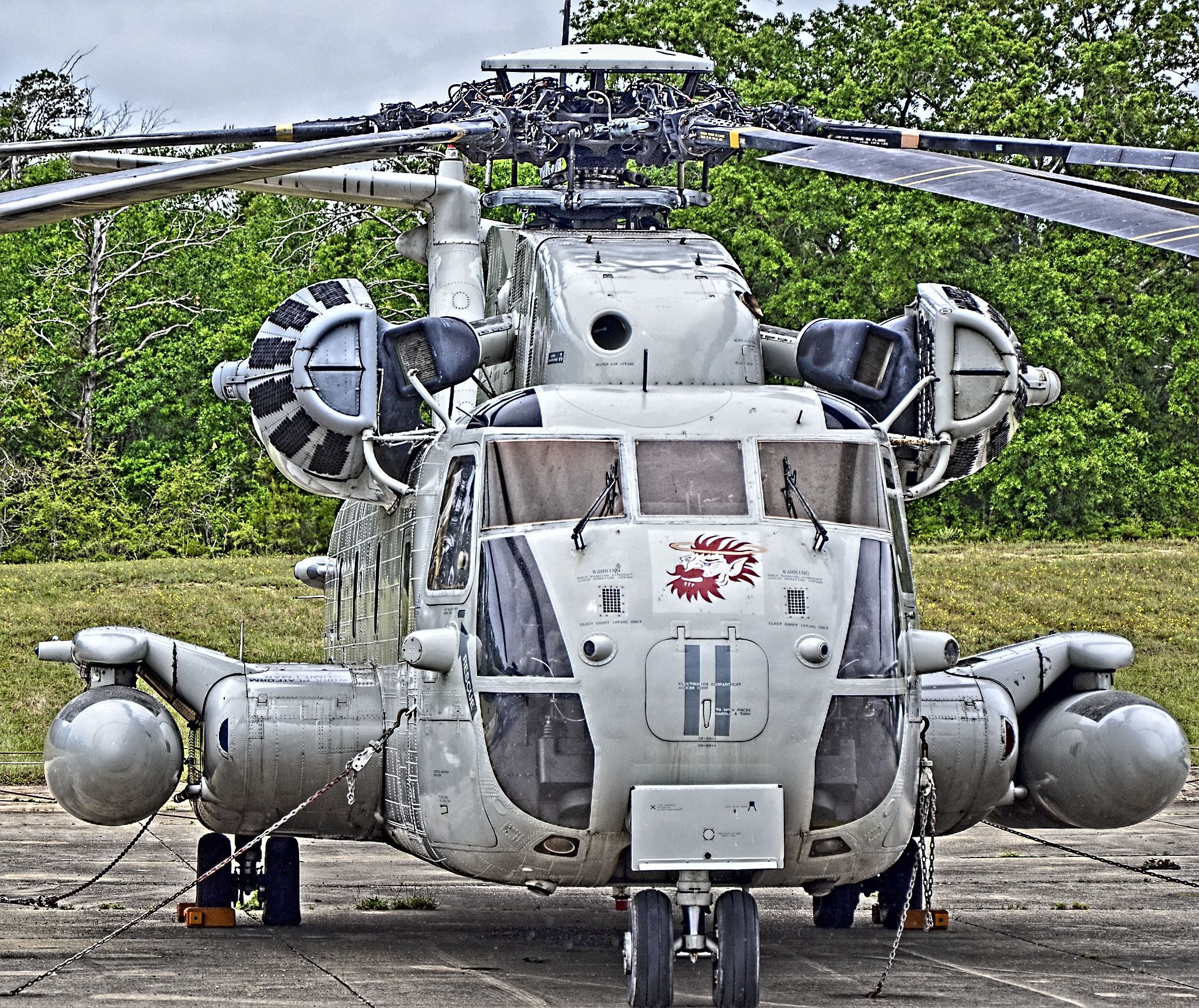
A CH-53D at the National Naval Aviation Museum

=== Israel ===
On display

- 471 (#65-078) - CH-53A on display at Israeli Air Force Museum, Hatzerim Airbase, Israel.

=== United States ===
On display

- 151686 - CH-53A on display at Paxtuxent River Naval Air Museum, Lexington Park, Maryland.
- 153304 – CH-53A on display at Flying Leatherneck Aviation Museum, MCAS Miramar, California.
- 153715 - CH-53A on display at Fort Worth Aviation Museum, Fort Worth, Texas
- 157159 - CH-53D on display at National Naval Aviation Museum, NAS Pensacola, Florida.
- 158690 - RH-53D on display at Air Victory Museum, Lumberton, New Jersey.

== Accidents and incidents ==
Due to the aircraft's large size and troop capacity, aerial accidents involving CH-53 helicopters have been some of the deadliest helicopter accidents.

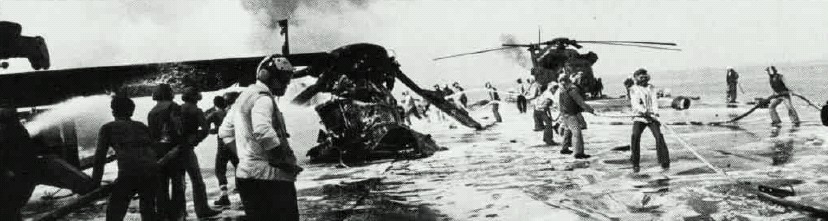
Sailors fight a fire on the USS Guam (LPH-9) on 19 July 1981. While operating 50 km southeast of Morehead City, North Carolina (USA), a Sikorsky CH-53 Sea Stallion crashed into another CH-53 and a Bell UH-1N Twin Huey upon landing

- On 23 June 1967, USMC CH-53A Bu. no #65-082 collided with a US Army UH-1B #63-8572 while taking off from Camp Lejeune, all 20 marines on board were killed along with two occupants of the UH-1B.
- On 8 January 1968, USMC CH-53A #65-100 of HMH-463 crashed in the Hải Lăng Forest south of Đông Hà Combat Base, killing all 46 personnel on board.
- On 19 February 1968, USMC CH-53A #65-055 crashed into Monkey Mountain killing all 13 personnel on board.
- On 22 February 1968, USMC CH-53A #65-060, was hit by antiaircraft fire and crashed at Khe Sanh Combat Base, killing two marines.
- On 1 May 1968, USMC CH-53A #65-058 crashed into the sea off Quảng Trị Province killing one crewman.
- On 28 July 1968, USMC CH-53A #65-061 crashed south of Danang killing all five crewmen.
- On 1 September 1969, USMC CH-53A #65-059 crashed in Thừa Thiên Province killing all five crewmen.
- On 13 September 1970, USMC CH-53D #65-181 was hit by antiaircraft fire and crashed with no fatalities.
- On 26 October 1970, USMC CH-53D #65-192 crashed on a test flight near Danang, killing one crewman.
- On 30 October 1970, USMC CH-53D #65-259 was hit by antiaircraft fire and crashed in Quảng Nam Province, killing two crewmen.
- On 18 February 1971, USAF CH-53C #65-227 of 21st Special Operations Squadron was hit by antiaircraft fire and crashed in Laos with no fatalities.
- On 8 February 1971, USMC CH-53D #65-189 crashed near Huế, killing all nine personnel on board.
- On 1 March 1971, USAF CH-53C #65-229 of 21st Special Operations Squadron was hit by antiaircraft fire and crashed near Long Tieng, killing six personnel.
- On 11 July 1972, USMC CH-53D #65-177 was hit by a surface to air missile and crashed near Quảng Trị, killing three crewmen and 45 South Vietnamese marines.
- On 24 January 1975, USAF CH-53C #65-338 of 21st Special Operations Squadron suffered main rotor head failure and crashed near Nakhon Phanom Royal Thai Navy Base, killing all four personnel on board.
- On 13 May 1975, USAF CH-53C #65-231 of 21st Special Operations Squadron crashed west of Nakhon Phanom Royal Thai Air Force Base, killing 23 Air Force personnel
- On 15 May 1975, during the Mayaguez Incident, three CH-53s of the 21st Special Operations Squadron were shot down by the Khmer Rouge, resulting in the deaths of ten marines, two Navy Corpsmen and two Air Force crewmen.
- On 26 September 1975, USAF CH-53C #65-342 of the 601st Tactical Air Support Squadron crashed near Delbrück (Paderborn) Germany killing 16 personnel on board.
- On 10 May 1977, a CH-53 crashed in Israel, resulting in the deaths of 54 people.
- On 21 October 1977, a CH-53 crashed in Mindoro, Philippines during sling load operations due to a design flaw in the tail rotor drive; 31 US marines serving in Operation Fortress Lightning were killed.
- On 11 December 1978, a CH-53G of the German Army Aviation Corps' Medium Transport Helicopter Regiment 25 crashed at Laupheim Air Base, Germany. During landing in poor visibility the tail rotor hit the ground. Of the four occupants, one was killed.
- On 25 April 1980, six USN RH-53s were lost in Operation Eagle Claw, the failed attempt to rescue American hostages in Iran.
- On 26 November 1980, a CH-53G of the German Army Aviation Corps' Medium Transport Helicopter Regiment 15 crashed in a forest near Wippenkausen, North Rhine-Westphalia, Germany. All four occupants were killed.
- On 14 September 1982, CH-53A #65-083 crashed into the North Sea off the coast of Denmark during NATO exercise "Northern Wedding" killing all 5 servicemen aboard. the Pilot, Capt. William H. "Sonny" Coke; Co-Pilot Capt James B. Huff; Crew Chief SSgt. Gary J. "Butch" Lester; Sgt. Timothy A. "Tim" Creighton; and chaplain, Navy Cdr. David R. Morrison. The Sea Stallion was part of Marine Heavy Helicopter Squadron-777.
- On 27 April 1983, a CH-53D crashed in the Atlantic off the coast of Virginia. The crash resulted in the drowning of Marine 1st Lt David A. Boyle. The suit brought by Boyle's father went to the Supreme Court.
- On 24 March 1984, a CH-53D crashed into a mountain in South Korea during a night troop operation, killing 29.
- On 6 May 1985, a CH-53D experienced a transmission failure and fell into Sea of Japan, killing 17. It was returning to Marine Corps Air Station Futenma from MCAS Iwakuni, Yamaguchi Prefecture.
- On 29 December 1988, an Israeli Yas'ur crashed during a border-stone laying mission at the Israel-Egypt border. Investigation determined that high-frequency heterodyne vibration, induced by a late control column attitude correction during hover by the pilot (the sole fatality), caused a structural failure; the separation of the aircraft's tail and its immediate, rapid counter-rotation and subsequent crash. The three remaining occupants were injured. A footage of this crash can be viewed on-line. A system of dampers to prevent rapid correction and thus the heterodyne vibrations, has been installed since on the remaining Yas'ur helicopters.
- On 20 March 1989, a Sea Stallion crashed while on maneuvers off mountainous east coast of South Korea, near P'ohang. Nineteen on board were killed. Sixteen other marines, including one on the ground, were injured in the crash.
- On 18 May 1990, a USMC CH-53D en route to Marine Corps Air Station Tustin crashed in Imperial County, California, killing one crew member and injuring five others. In climbing flight, a pitch lock engaged in one main rotor blade causing a violent vibration that resulted in the tail rotor departing the aircraft at 2,200 ft (670 m) AGL. Torque and rapid rotation contributed to the aircraft breaking apart further just aft of the main transmission. Auto-rotation resulted a bounce, roll over and fire. Auxiliary tanks were attached. More than 200 servicemen had been killed in accidents involving the CH-53A, CH-53D, and CH-53E from 1969 to 1990.
- On 14 March 1994, a CH-53D landed tail-first and burst into flames on a military runway in Northern California. One marine was killed and four marines were injured.
- On 4 February 1997, two CH-53s collided in Israel. A total of 73 people died in the accident.
- On 21 December 2002, a CH-53G of the German Army Aviation Corps' Medium Transport Helicopter Regiment 25 crashed near Kabul killing all seven occupants. An investigation following the accident concluded that the crash was caused by mechanical failure.
- On 23 November 2003, a MH-53M crashed near Bagram Air Base in Afghanistan. Five U.S. servicemen were killed.
- On 13 August 2004, a USMC CH-53D from Marine Corps Air Station Futenma crashedinto Okinawa International University on Okinawa, Japan. No serious damage or injuries resulted but the crash caused an international incident because of strained relations about the US use of Futenma. The crash was caused by a maintenance error.
- On 28 November 2008, CH-53G Registration 84+36 of the German Army Aviation Corps' Medium Helicopter Transport Regiment 25 had a hard landing during an exercise at an altitude of 6,900 feet (2,300 m) near Engelberg in the Swiss Alps, injuring one of the six occupants. The dismantling and partial recovery of the helicopter wreckage was completed in June 2009 by helilifting 84+36 slung below her sister 84+32 down to the village of Alpnach.
- On 26 July 2010, an Israeli CH-53 crashed during a training flight in the Carpathian mountains in Romania, killing six Israeli soldiers and one Romanian.
- On 29 March 2011, a USMC CH-53D from MCBH Kaneohe Bay crashed into the bay, killing one and injuring three.
- On 19 January 2012, a USMC CH-53D crashed in southern Afghanistan. Six International Security Assistance Force (ISAF) troops, all marines, were killed in the accident.

== Specifications (CH-53D) ==

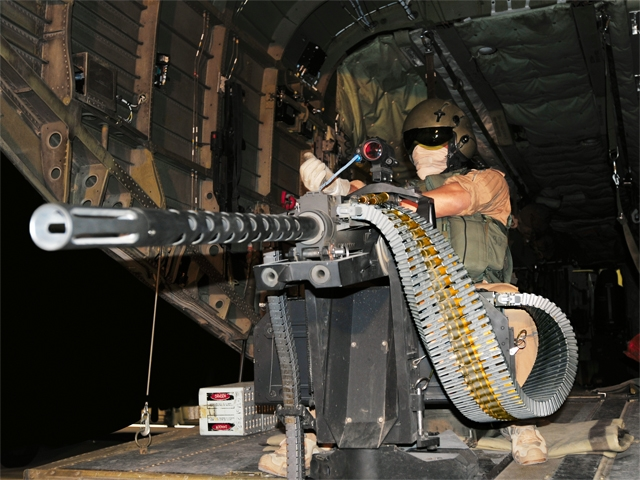
A German Army door gunner on board a CH-53

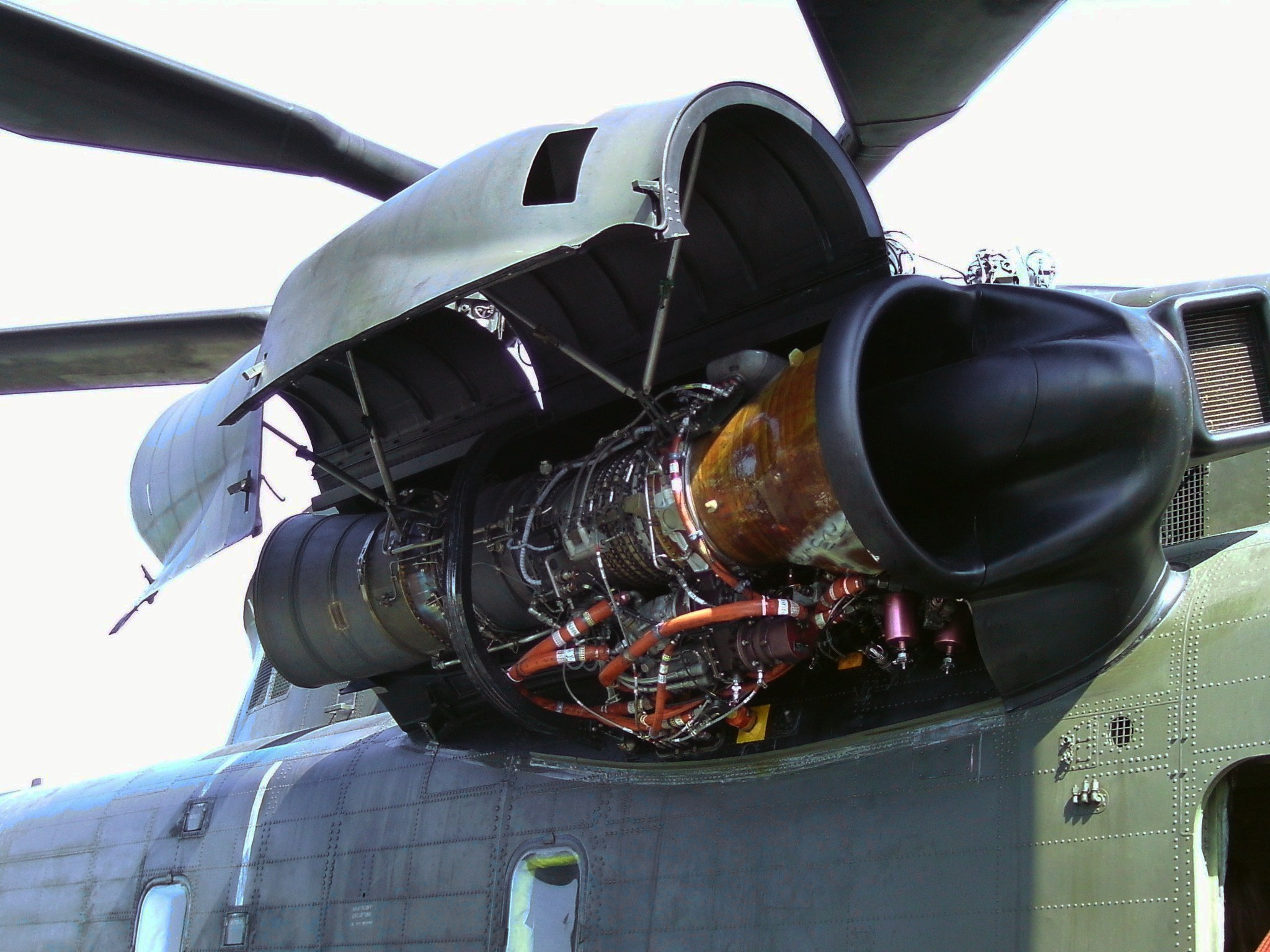
A CH-53G engine

Data from Deagel.com, U.S. Navy history, International Directory, US Navy Fact File

General characteristics

- Crew: 2 pilots, 1 or more loadmasters / crewmen
- Capacity: 38 troops (55 in alternate configuration) or 24 stretchers / 8,000 lb (3,600 kg) payload
- Length: 67 ft 6 in (20.57 m) for fuselage
- Width: 28 ft 4 in (8.64 m) over stub wings

15 ft 6 in (5 m) across fuselage

- Empty weight: 23,628 lb (10,717 kg)
- Gross weight: 33,500 lb (15,195 kg)
- Max takeoff weight: 42,000 lb (19,051 kg)
- Powerplant: 2 × General Electric T64-GE-413 turboshaft engines, 3,925 shp (2,927 kW) each
- Main rotor diameter: 72 ft 2.8 in (22.017 m)
- Main rotor area: 4,098.1 sq ft (380.73 m^{2}) 6-bladed main rotor
- Blade section: – NACA 0011 mod

Performance

- Maximum speed: 170 kn (200 mph, 310 km/h)
- Cruise speed: 150 kn (170 mph, 280 km/h)
- Range: 540 nmi (620 mi, 1,000 km)
- Combat range: 95 nmi (109 mi, 176 km)
- Ferry range: 886 nmi (1,020 mi, 1,641 km)
- Service ceiling: 16,750 ft (5,110 m)
- Rate of climb: 2,460 ft/min (12.5 m/s)
- Disk loading: 8.95 lb/sq ft (43.7 kg/m^{2})

Armament

- Two door mounted .50 BMG GAU-15/A machine guns. Some have a ramp mounted .50 BMG GAU-21 machine gun.
- German CH-53Gs can mount two 7.62×51mm MG3 machine guns in the side doors, which are to be replaced by two .50 BMG M3M/GAU-21 machines guns in the doors and one on the ramp.

== See also ==
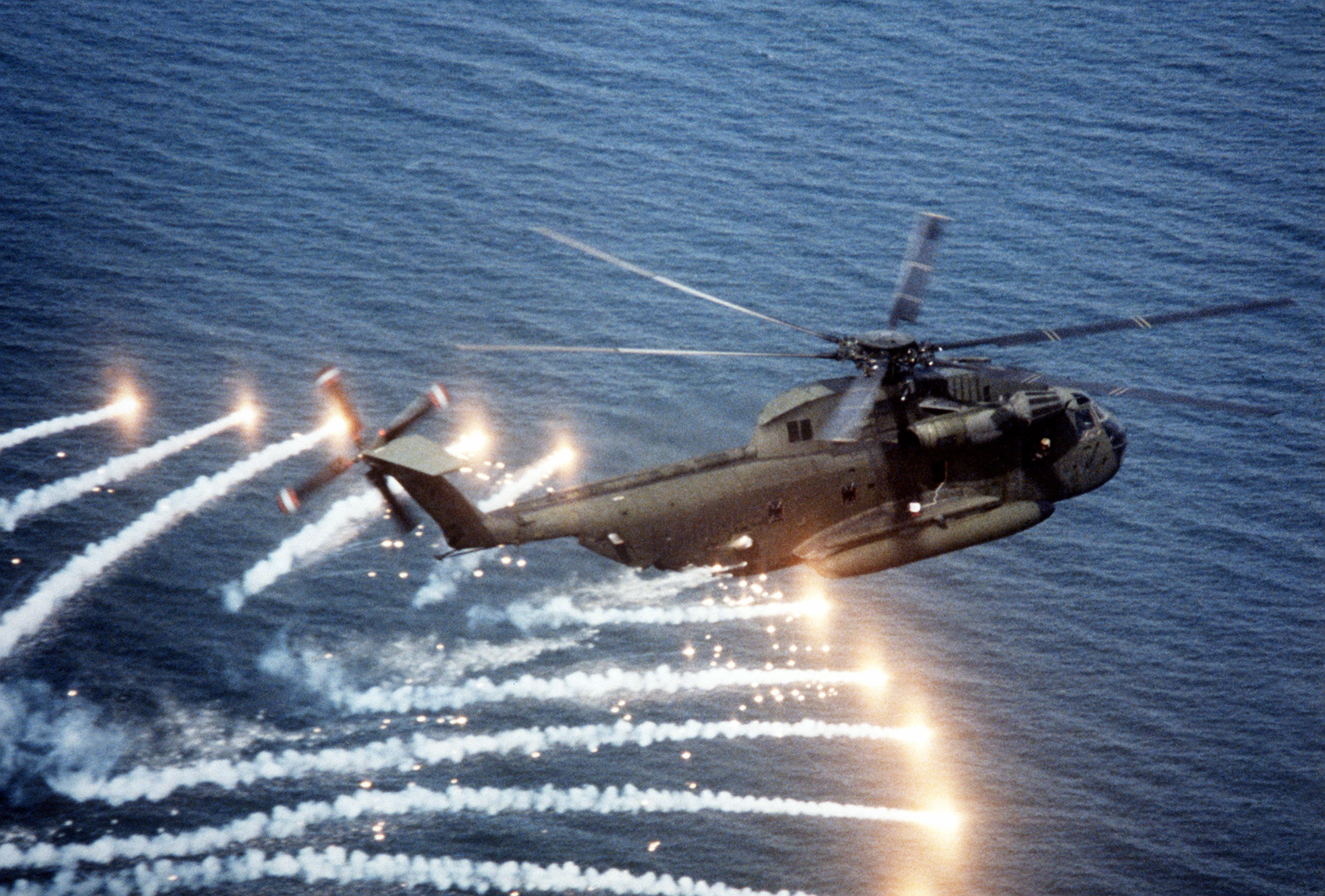
A CH-53D releasing flares near Naval Air Station Patuxent River, 1982

Related development

- Sikorsky CH-53E Super Stallion
- Sikorsky CH-53K King Stallion
- Sikorsky CH-54 Tarhe
- Sikorsky HH-53 "Super Jolly Green Giant"/MH-53 Pave Low
- Sikorsky S-61R

Aircraft of comparable role, configuration, and era

- Aérospatiale Super Frelon
- Boeing CH-47 Chinook
- Mil Mi-14

Related lists

- List of active United States military aircraft
- List of military aircraft of the United States
- List of rotorcraft
