= Bim (pop duo) =

UK musical group

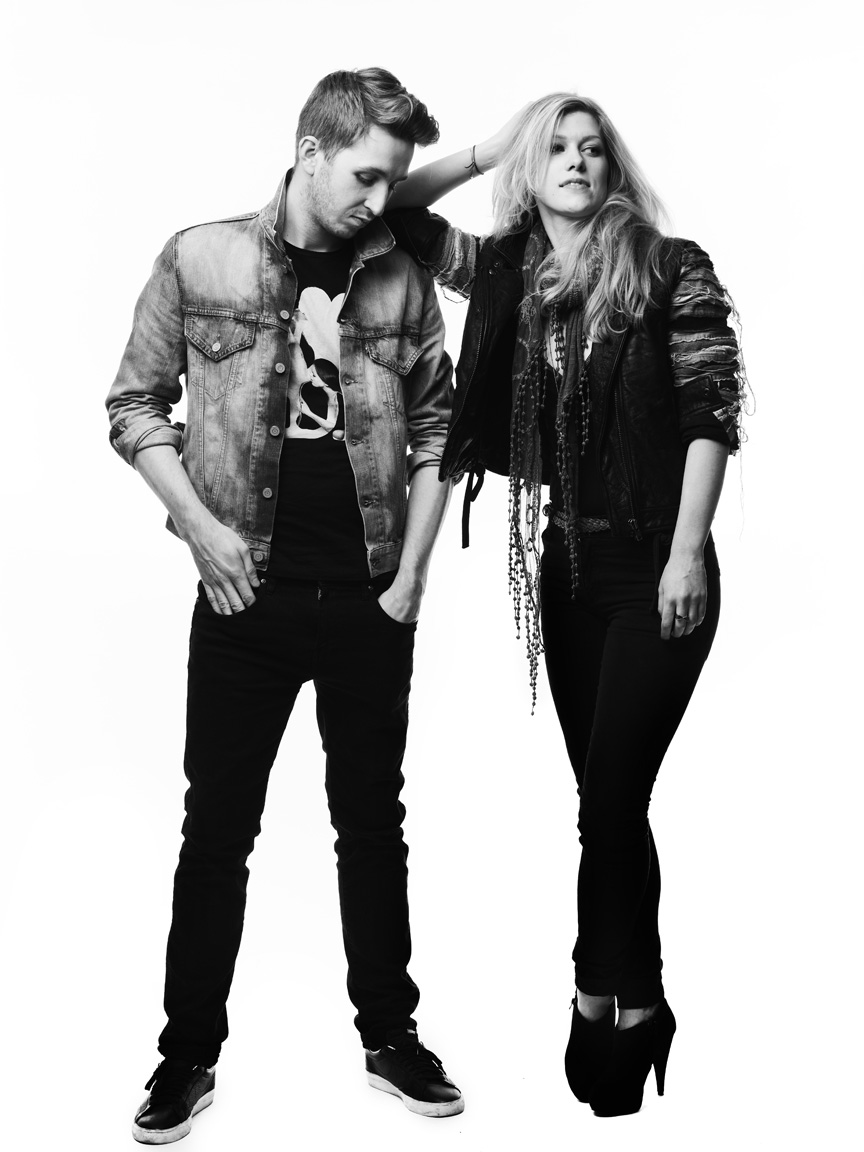
- Rebecca Rosier and Tim Davis of Bim, 2010

Background information
- Origin: Bath, Somerset, England
- Genres: Electro, pop, acoustic
- Years active: 2008–present
- Labels: Unsigned
- Members: Tim Davis; Rebecca Rosier

Bim are a British electro and acoustic duo. They released their debut album, Scatterheart in October 2010.

== History ==
Based in Bath, Somerset, Bim are composed of Tim Davis (singer, songwriter, producer) and Rebecca Rosier (singer, songwriter). Davis is primarily a pop producer/writer, but has also composed for commercials. Rosier is a writer and trained as a contemporary dancer.

=== Bim EP (2007) ===
The duo met and formed in 2007 after being introduced at a Million Dead gig in Bristol. Davis was involved in pop-punk band Home From Home at the time, while also working on a solo electro project. After recording a demo together, the duo continued to write and record while studying at universities in London, releasing their first EP in September 2007.

A video for the single "Stay in My Memory", by award-winning mixed media animator Katy Davis gained popularity and won a number of awards in animation and short film festivals in 2009. The video went on to be featured on YouTube and Myspace. At time of writing (24 June 2011), the video has had 825,960 views on YouTube.

=== Scatterheart (2010) ===
The duo released "Head Over Heels", the first single from their debut album Scatterheart, as a free download in October 2010. Scatterheart was independently released shortly after with a secret launch party at Road Trip in London with The Good Natured, organised by pop blogger EQ. Following the album launch, the duo were Band of the Day in national newspaper The Guardian, as well as featuring in NME's Peter Robinson's top five underground bands. Q labeled them as "the next big things" while in the American Instinct magazine, the album was given a four-star review.

In late summer of 2010, the duo released acoustic versions of their album tracks, "Raindrops", "Head Over Heels" with a cover version of Regina Spektor's "Us".

=== Singles and EP (2012/2013) ===
Bim released singles "Scream" in April 2012 and "Lights Out" in August 2012, with an EP Lifelines released in November 2012. On Valentine's Day in 2013, Bim released a cover version of Chris de Burgh's "The Lady in Red", which received airplay on BBC Introducing and was picked up by MTV (UK and Ireland). Later in the same year, the duo released an acoustic track, "Stop You", also seen on MTV (UK and Ireland).

=== Two (2015) ===
In March 2015, Bim are due to release their second album, Two, independently via their website. The first single, "My Body My Mind" was released on YouTube and via Bim's website on 28 January 2015, featuring a video that was entirely shot in reverse.

== Discography ==
- Bim EP (2007)
- Scatterheart (2010)
- Lifelines EP (2012)
- Two (2015)
