= Bim (name) =

Bim or Bím may refer to the following people:

Given name or nickname

- Bim Afolami (born 1986), British politician
- Bim Diederich (1922–2012), Luxembourger road bicycle racer
- Bim Sherman (1950–2000), Jamaican musician and singer-songwriter
- James May (born 1963), English television presenter

Surname

- Josef Bím (1901–1934), Czechoslovak soldier and skier
