= Blade inspection method =

A blade inspection method is the practice of monitoring the condition of a blade, such as a helicopter's rotor blade, for deterioration or damage. A common area of focus in the aviation industry has been the detection of cracking, which is commonly associated with fatigue. Automated blade condition monitoring technology has been developed for helicopters and has seen widespread adoption. The technique is routinely mandated by airworthiness authorities for engine inspections. Another commercial sector where such monitoring has become important is electricity generation, particularly on wind farms.

== Aviation ==
The propellers used to power numerous aircraft require regular inspections to ensure their integrity. The interval for such inspections is typically specified by the propeller's manufacturer. Regardless of being made of wood, metal or composite materials, visual inspections have typically been sufficient for observing any evidence of failure, sub-par condition, or damage sustained. However, some composite materials necessitate additional techniques such as ultrasound scans, to be performed to detect subsurface issues that may lack any external indications of their presence.

Similarly, the fan blades of jet engines are susceptible to cracking and thus require routine inspections to be conducted by operators. Such inspections are typically performed during maintenance intervals, typically using a combination of visual and ultrasound scans performed upon each fan blade by technicians to detect any cracks. During October 2018, both the Federal Aviation Administration (FAA) and the European Aviation Safety Agency (EASA) issued updated airworthiness directives that specified more frequent inspections of the blades of the CFM International CFM56-7B turbofan powerplant used on many airliners.

The in-flight failure of a rotorcraft's main rotor blade would likely lead to a serious life-jeopardising accident. Thus, manufacturers have developed detection techniques that guard against blade failure caused by fatigue cracking. A common method involves the pressurisation of the interior cavity of the rotor blade spar with nitrogen gas. Upon the formation of a crack, pressure is lost and a sensor built into the root of the rotor blade would detect this pressure change. Readouts from this sensor would be displayed via a cockpit display to the pilot. This system is intended to alert operators to cracking rotor blades in advance of a catastrophic failure, allowing for replacement blades to be installed in advance of such an outcome. American helicopter specialist Sikorsky has incorporated this technology onto several of its rotorcraft, including the S-61 series, S-65 series, and other models. In some cases, advanced detection of rotor blade flaws can allow for the repairs to be made, allowing for the blade to continue to be used.

== Electricity generation ==
The use of blade inspection methods has become commonplace amongst electricity-generating wind turbines. The detection of defects in blades, often attributed to fabrication, increases system reliability, as well as blade lifespan and enables more efficient condition-based maintenance; repairs can occur before more extensive damage levels is sustained, minimising turbine downtime. By the late 2010s, early practices for blade inspection have typically been determined to be incapable of detecting damage at an early stage. By this point, considerable research had been conducted to refine optimal techniques of performing non-destructive testing (NDI). Furthermore, it is believed that the requirement for comprehensive systems for blade inspection shall grow in line with the cost per blade and the associated lost revenue incurred from downtime.

The blades of wind turbine are complex structures that incorporate composite materials. As such, they have reportedly posed unique inspection challenges, possessing relatively thick spar cap structures and porous bond lines, varying core material, along with a multitude of possible manufacturing defects and forms of in-service damage. Techniques have improved as a greater understanding of how blades undergo structural aging; critical evaluations of such techniques have aimed to measure their sensitivity, accuracy, repeatability, speed, ease of data interpretation, and ease of deployment. Researchers at Sandia National Labs determined that a thorough combination of several inspection methods may be required for optimal inspection sensitivity and reliability for both near-surface and deep, subsurface damage. Blade inspection techniques have been performed using fields such as ultrasound, microwave, thermography, shearography, and optical. Some of these techniques can be applied via remotely-operated unmanned aerial vehicles (UAVs), reducing or eliminating the need for traditional manned inspections by trained climbers.
