= Ramat David Airbase =

Air base in Israel

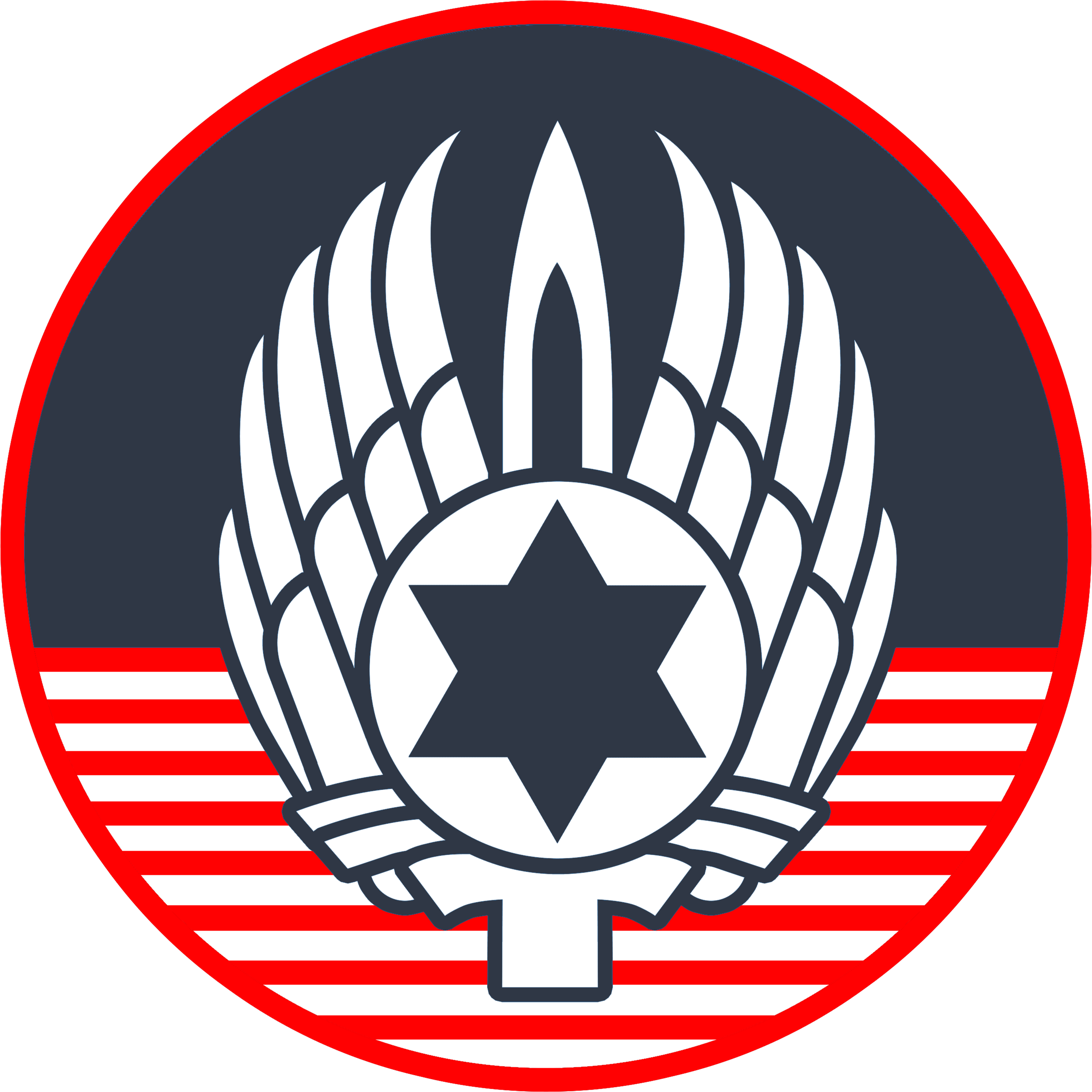
Ramat David Israeli Air Force Base Air Wing 1 "Ezer Weizman"
- בָּסִיס חֵיל-הַאֲוִויר רָמַת דָּוִד
- Ramat David, Northern District in Israel
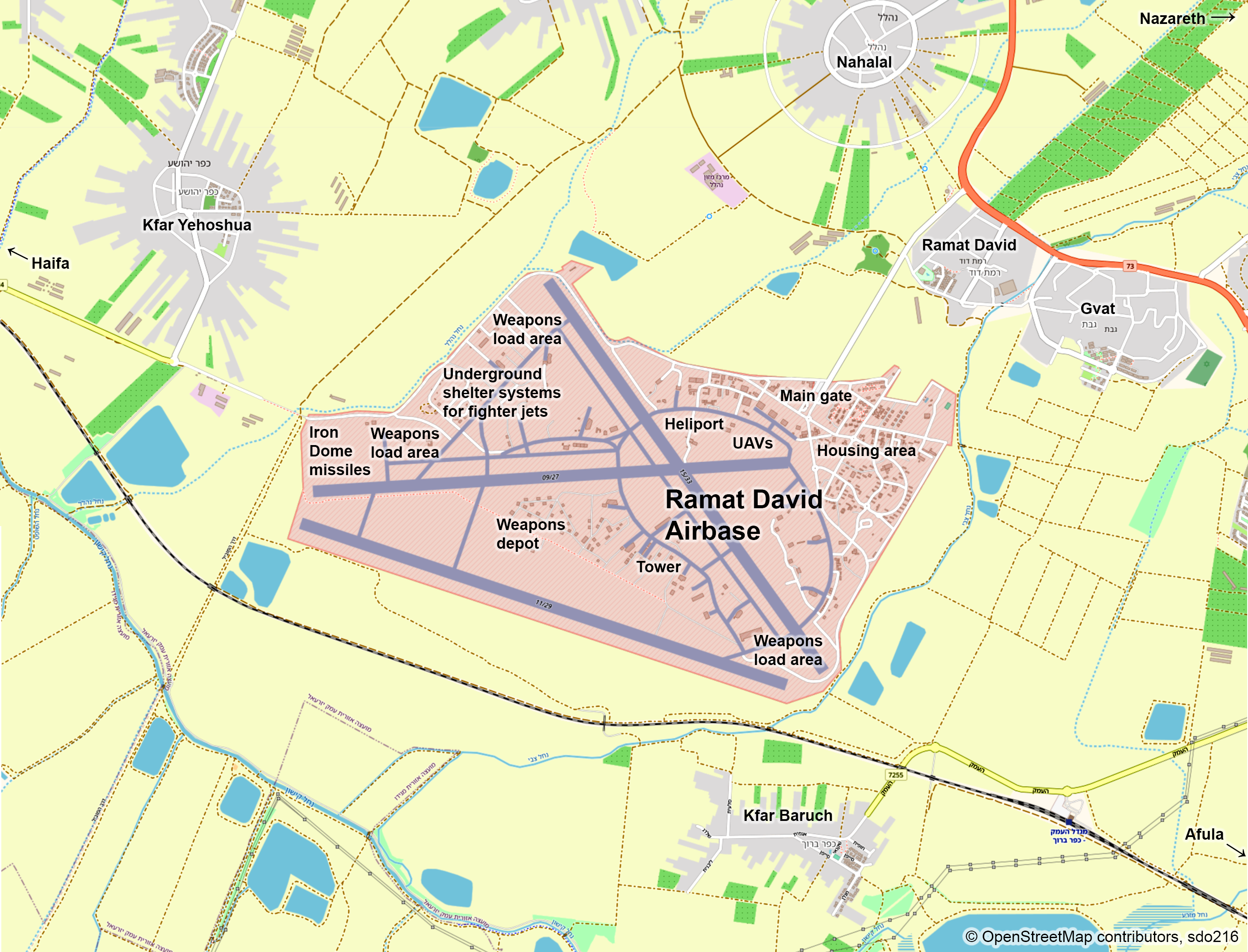

Site information
- Type: Airbase
- Owner: Israel Defense Forces
- Operator: Israeli Air Force

Location
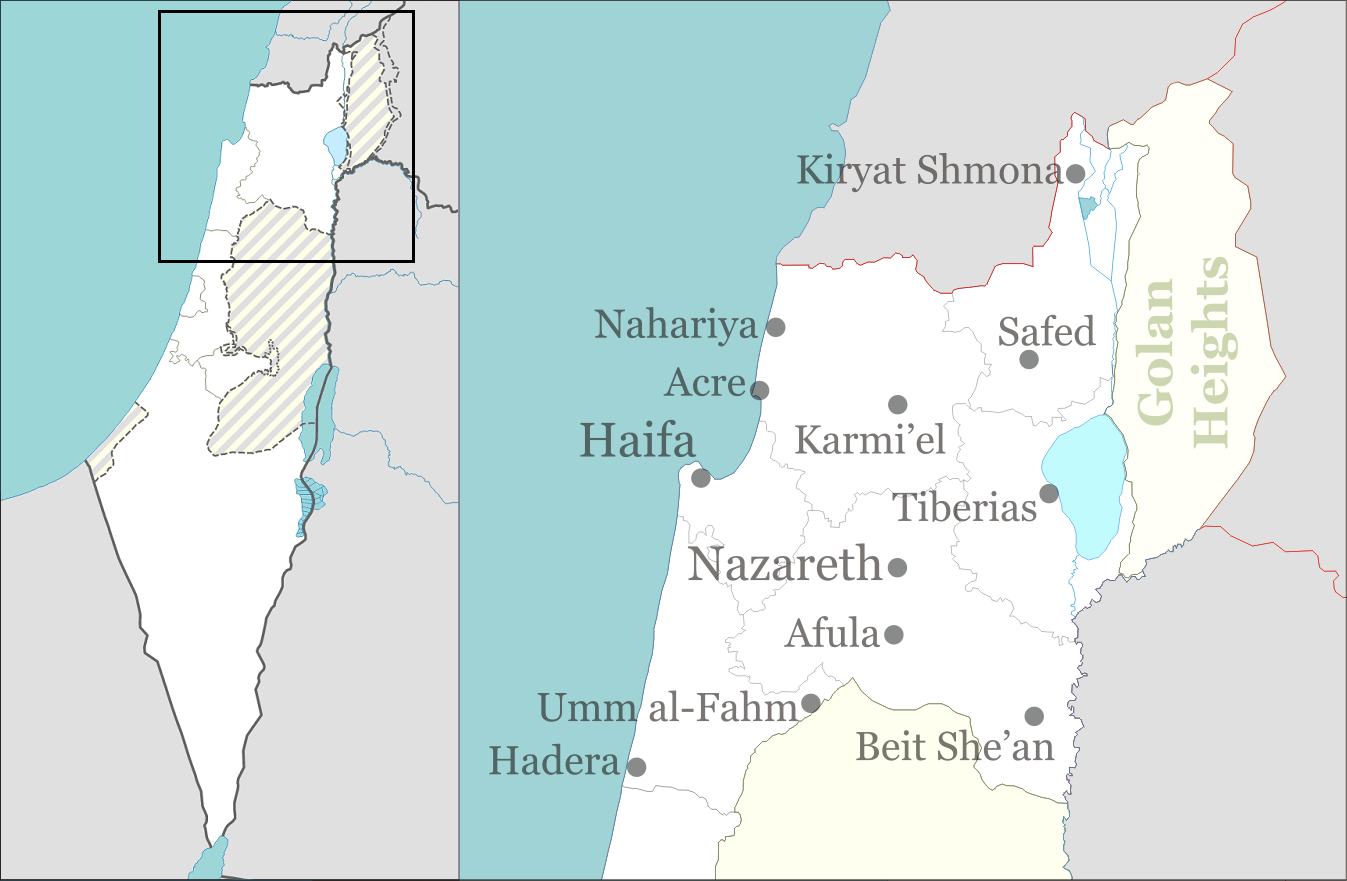
- Shown within Israel Ramat David Airbase (Israel)
- Coordinates: 32°40′00″N 035°11′00″E

Site history
- Built: 1942 RAF / 1948 IAF
- In use: 1942 - present

Airfield information
- Identifiers: ICAO: LLRD
- Elevation: 56 metres (184 ft) AMSL
Runways
Direction	Length and surface
09/27	2,606 metres (8,550 ft) Asphalt
11/29	2,431 metres (7,976 ft) Asphalt
15/33	2,406 metres (7,894 ft) Asphalt

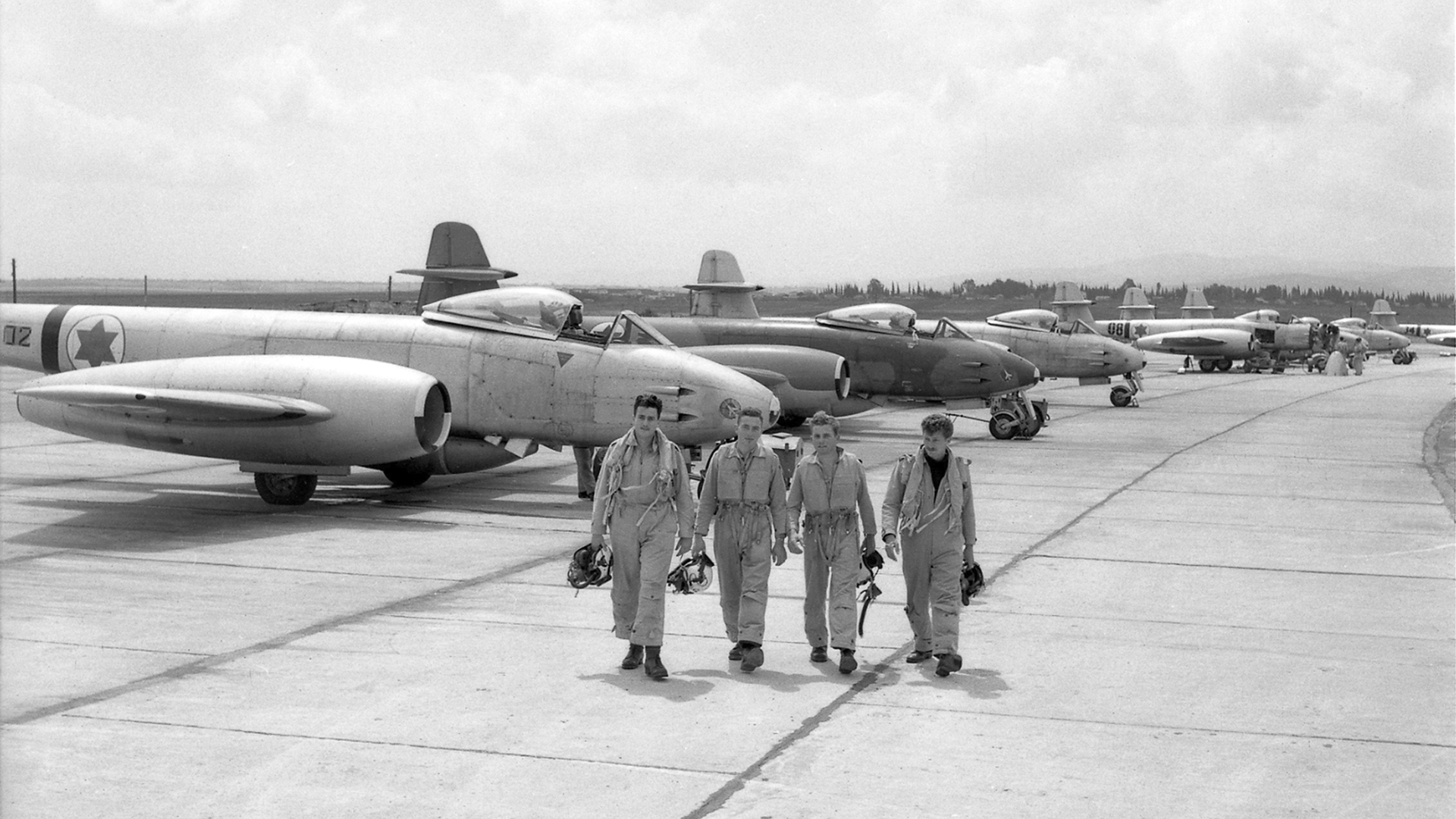
Four young Israeli fighter pilots walking in front of their Gloster Meteor F.8 jets of 117 Squadron "First Jet" at Ramat David Airbase around 1954

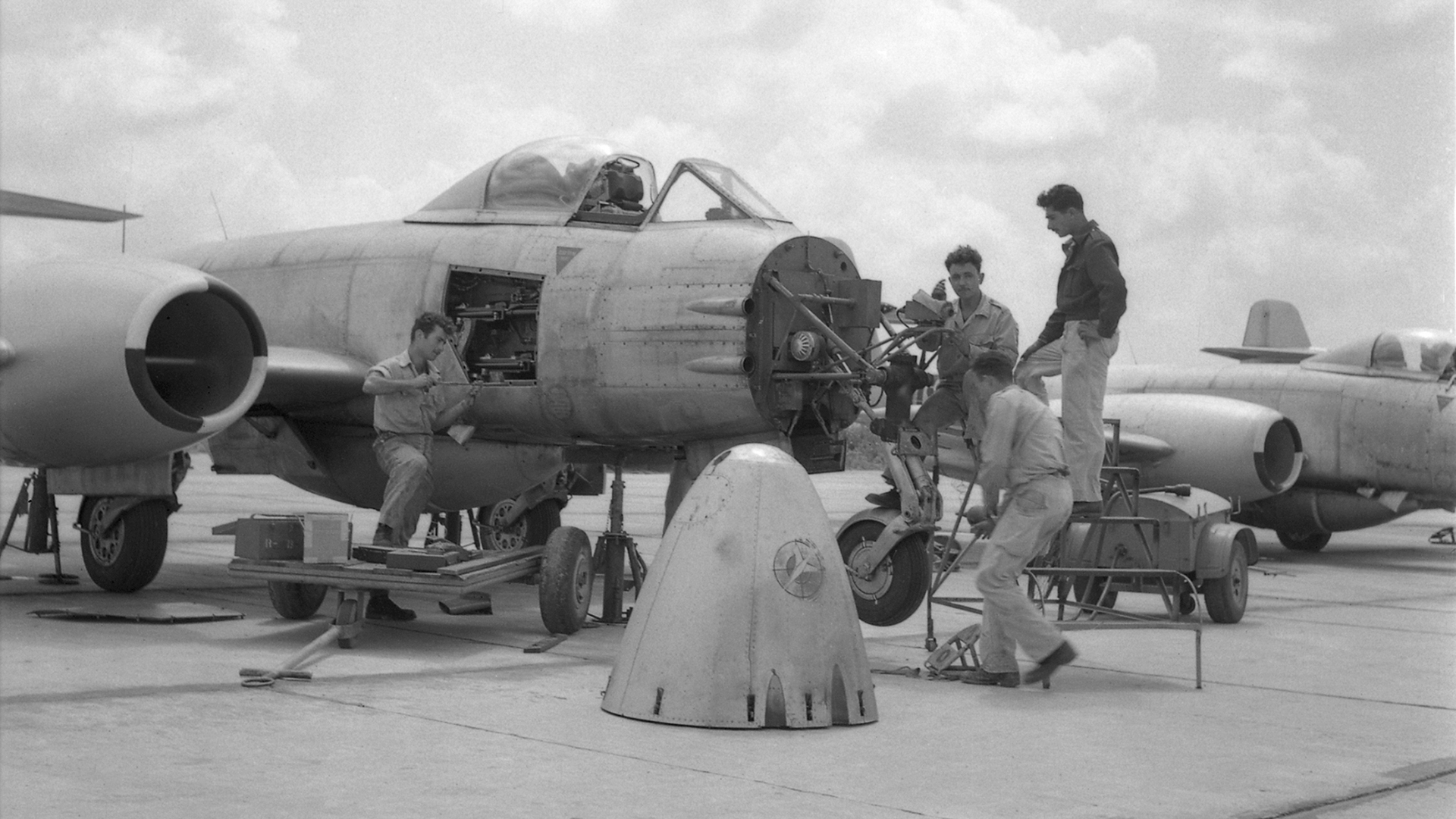
Jet maintenance work on a Gloster Meteor F.8 of 117 Squadron "First Jet" at Ramat David around 1954

Ramat David Airbase (ICAO: LLRD, Hebrew: בָּסִיס חֵיל-הַאֲוִיר רָמַת דָּוִד Basis Kheil HaAvir Ramat David, English: David Heights) is an Israeli Air Force (IAF) base located 20 km southeast of Haifa in the Northern District of Israel, close to kibbutz Ramat David in the Jezreel Valley. It is the northernmost IAF base in Israel with fighter jets and UAVs based on it. And it has three runways, each about 2.5 km long, and a heliport. For many years, there have been plans to convert Ramat David into an international airport for the city of Haifa and northern Israel. This has now been officially decided by the Israeli government in February 2026. (see here).

== History ==
=== Kibbutz and military camp ===
Before the airbase was built during World War II, there was already a British military camp here. The nearby Kibbutz Ramat David "David Heights", founded in 1926, takes its name from British Prime Minister David Lloyd George, who was in office at the time of the Balfour Declaration (1917), where the establishment of a "national home for the Jewish people" in Palestine was solemnly proclaimed.

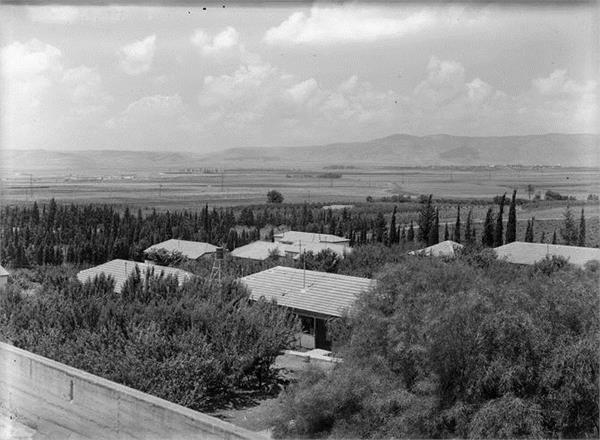
Kibbutz Ramat David in 1936 – the airbase was built a few years later on the plain in the background

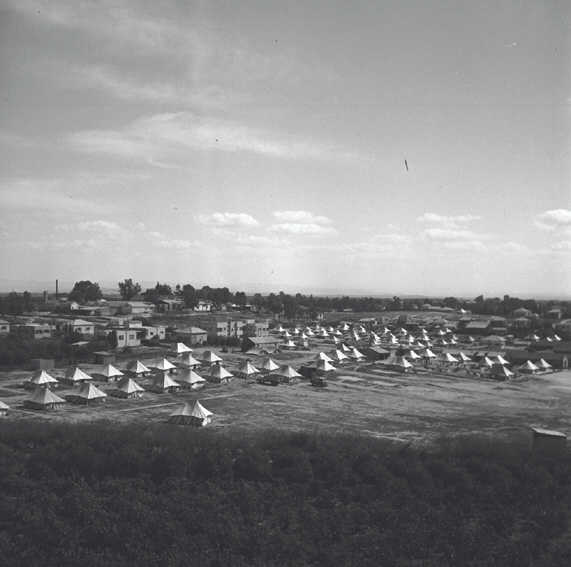
The tents of the British military camp on the edge of Kibbutz Ramat David, early January 1940

=== RAF Ramat David ===
Roald Dahl, in his World War II autobiography 'Going Solo', mentions landing his RAF Hawker Hurricane Mk.I at Ramat David in June 1941. At that time it was a ribbon of dry earth that had been rolled out in the middle of a large field of sweet-corn built by the Brits and residents of the nearby kibbutz, as Roald Dahl also reports near the end of his book. This secret airstrip behind Mount Carmel was originally installed as an alternative runway in case the Haifa Aerodrome (RAF Haifa) 20 km northwest of it was attacked and damaged by the Germans or Italians.

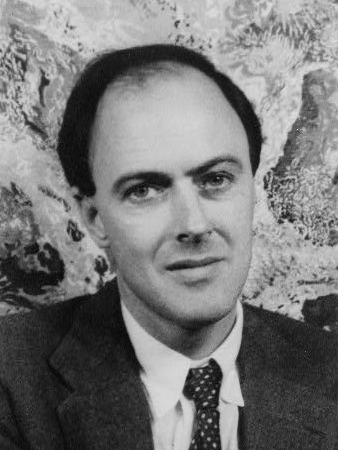
The British WWII fighter pilot and writer Roald Dahl in 1956

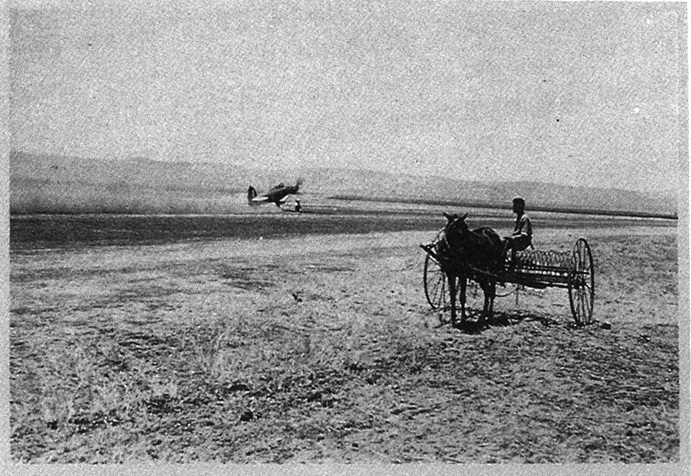
The temporary airstrip near kibbutz Ramat David around 1941

In 1942, the RAF Ramat David military airfield was finally established by the Royal Air Force (RAF) under the British Mandate for Palestine. From this point on, several British aircraft squadrons with fighter aircraft, bombers and transport aircraft were stationed there in turn (see list of former RAF units below).

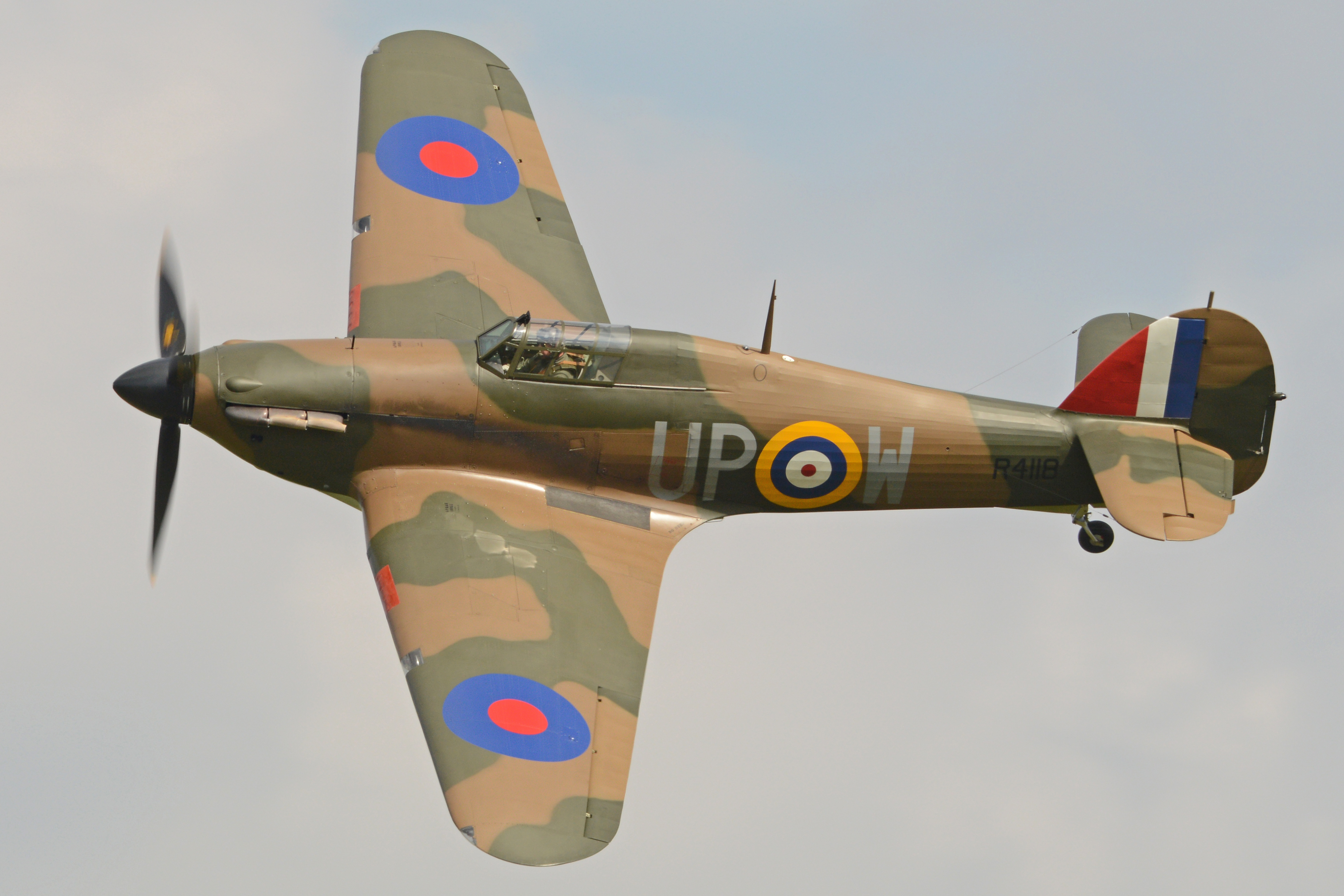
A Hawker Hurricane Mk.I, once flown by Roald Dahl and stationed at Ramat David

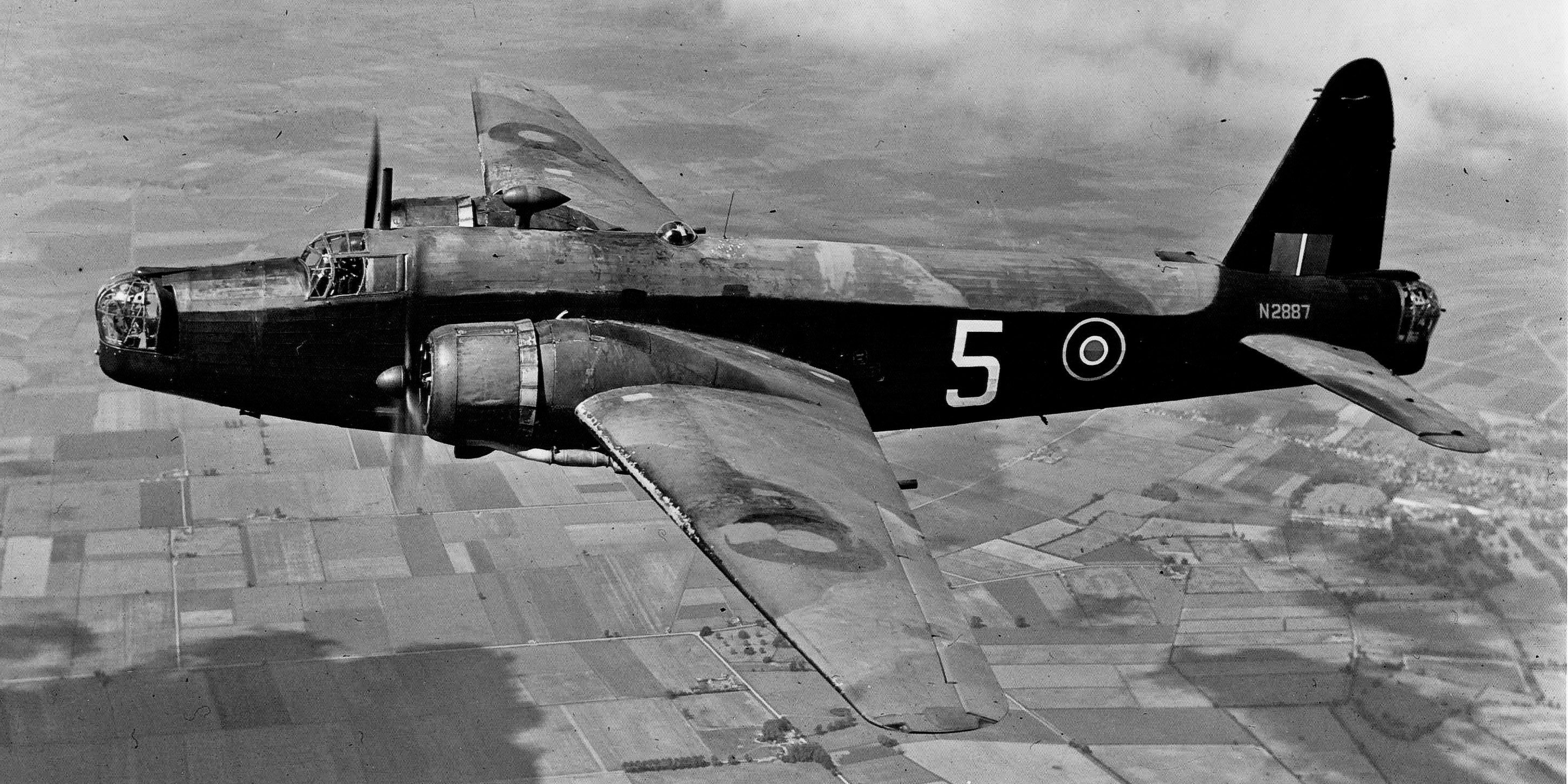
A Vickers Wellington Mk.IA bomber, temporarily stationed at Ramat David

During the Second World War Jewish paratroopers trained at Ramat David to serve in RAF special operation commandos and to drop behind enemy lines in German or German-occupied territory. They were supposed to help bring downed Allied airmen safely back and help Jews hide from the Nazis. Several of them died (see memorial stone in the gallery below).

==== Former RAF units ====
Former Royal Air Force operational units at RAF Ramat David:

- No. 6 Squadron RAF between 28 September 1945 and 2 June 1946 with the Hawker Hurricane IV & Supermarine Spitfire LF.9
- No. 32 Squadron RAF initially between 25 February and 27 September 145 with the Spitfire IX, then between 6 June and 3 October 1946 still with the Spitfire and finally until March 1949 with the Spitfire IX and FR.18 as a detachment
- Detachment from No. 37 Squadron RAF between September 1947 and March 1948 with the Avro Lancaster MR.3
- Detachment from No. 46 Squadron RAF between May 1942 and January 1943 with the Bristol Beaufighter IF
- No. 74 Squadron RAF between 8 July and 4 September 1942 with the Spitfire VB
- No. 127 Squadron RAF between 26 January and 13 March 1943 with the Spitfire VC
- Detachment from No. 154 Squadron RAF between December 1943 and March 1944 with the Spitfire IX
- No. 208 Squadron RAF initially between 5 July and 13 August 1945 with the Spitfire IX, then between March and November 1948 as a detachment with the Spitfire FR.18
- No. 213 Squadron RAF between 13 September 1945 and 25 September 1946 with the North American Mustang III/IV
- Detachment from No. 216 Squadron RAF from November 1942 and April 1943 with the Lockheed Hudson VI
- Detachment from No. 232 Squadron RAF between December 1943 and March 1944 with the Spitfire IX
- Detachment from No. 242 Squadron RAF between February and March 1944 with the Spitfire IX
- Detachment from No. 243 Squadron RAF between December 1943 and March 1944 with the Spitfire IX
- No. 249 Squadron RAF between 13 April And 17 May 1948 with the Hawker Tempest F.6
- Detachment from No. 294 Squadron RAF between March 1944 and June 1945 with the Vickers Wellington
- Detachment from No. 459 Squadron RAAF from December 1943, the full squadron until May 1944 with the Hudson VI
- No. 1909 Flight of No. 651 Squadron RAF between July 1946 and August 1948 with the Auster AOP.6
- No. 4 Middle East Training School between 20 March 1943 and 30 April 1944, when the unit was disbanded.

==== Gallery ====
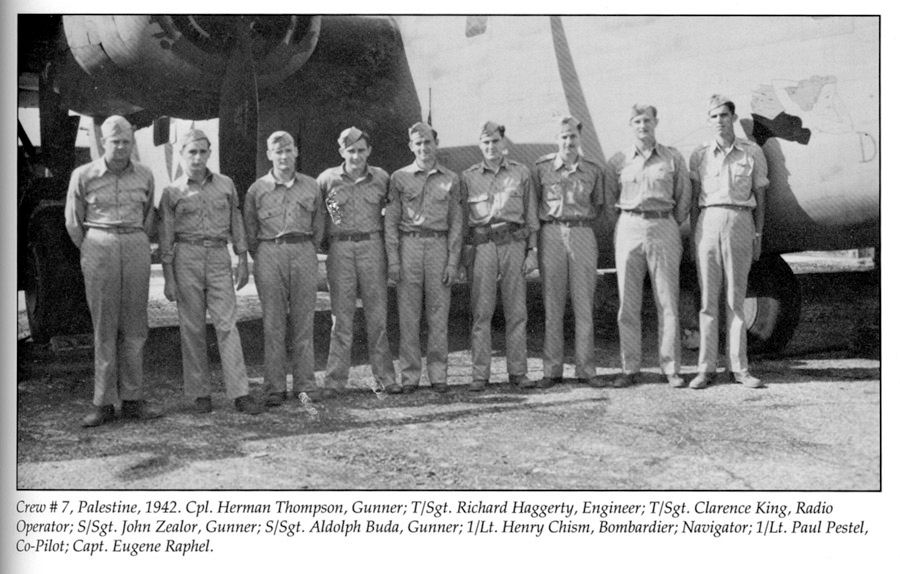
A B-24 Liberator aircrew from the US 98th Bombardment Group at RAF Ramat David in the summer of 1942

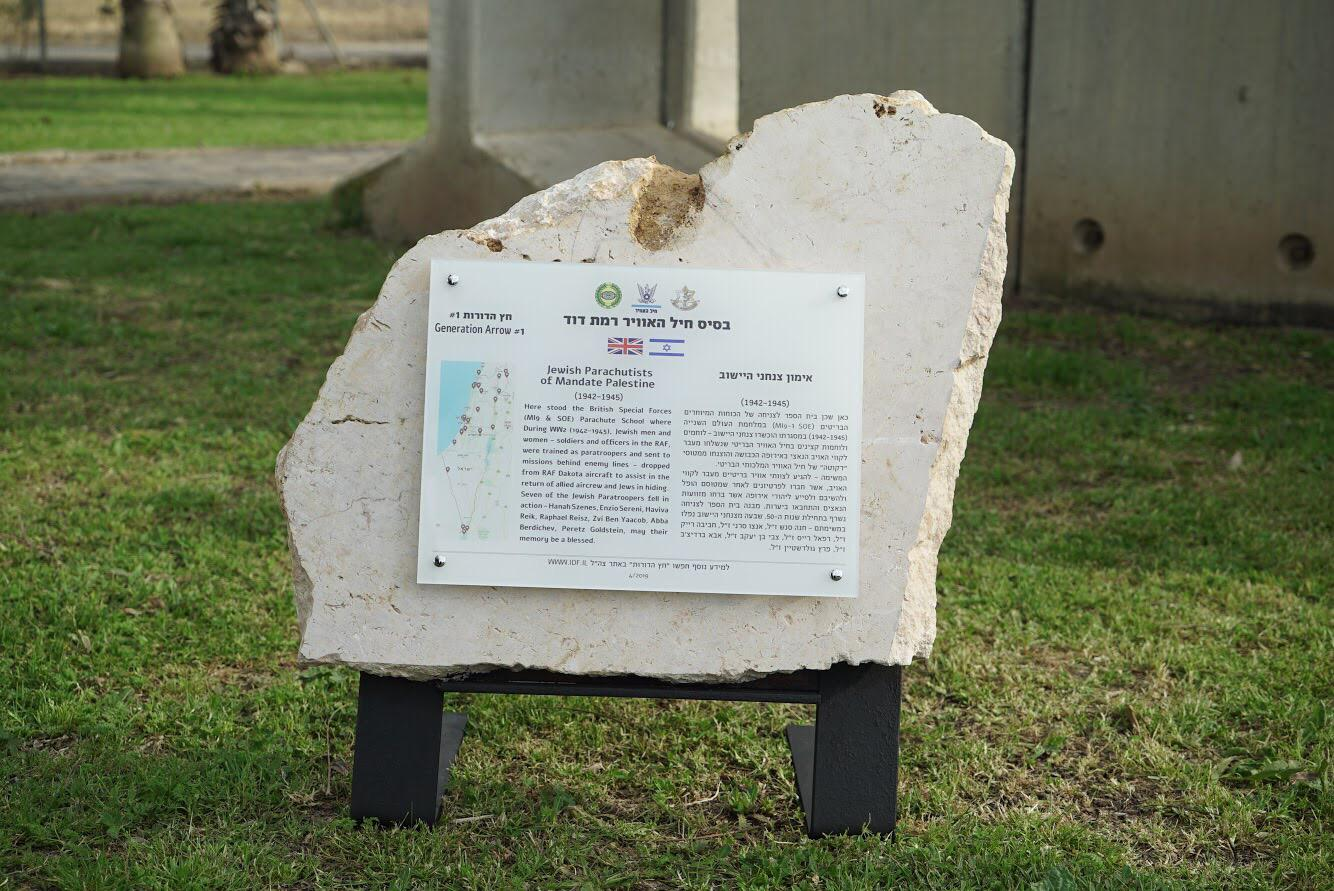
Memorial stone of the WWII paratrooper school for the training of Jewish special forces in the RAF

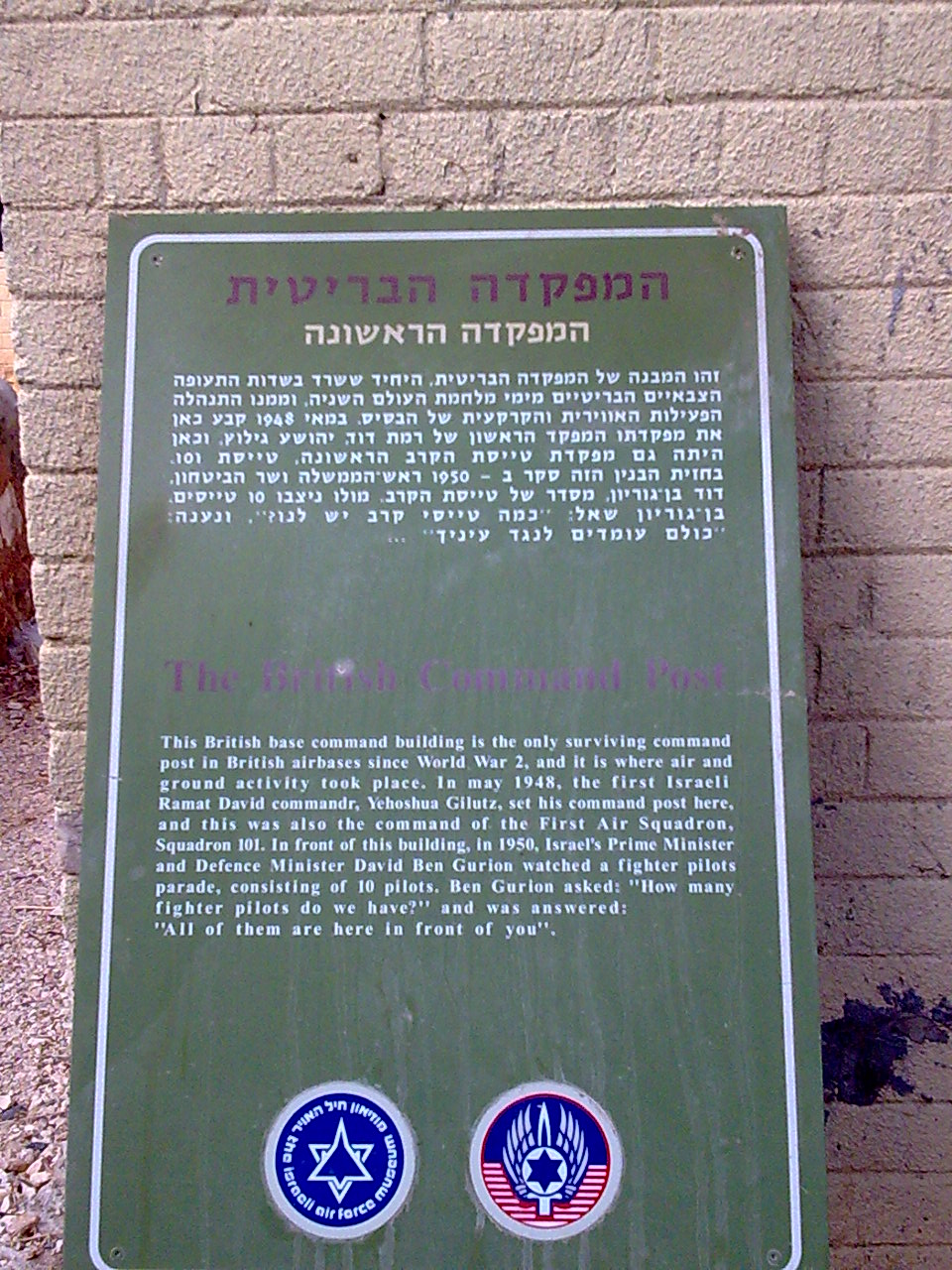
Plaque in front of the former British headquarters, which was then also used by the IAF

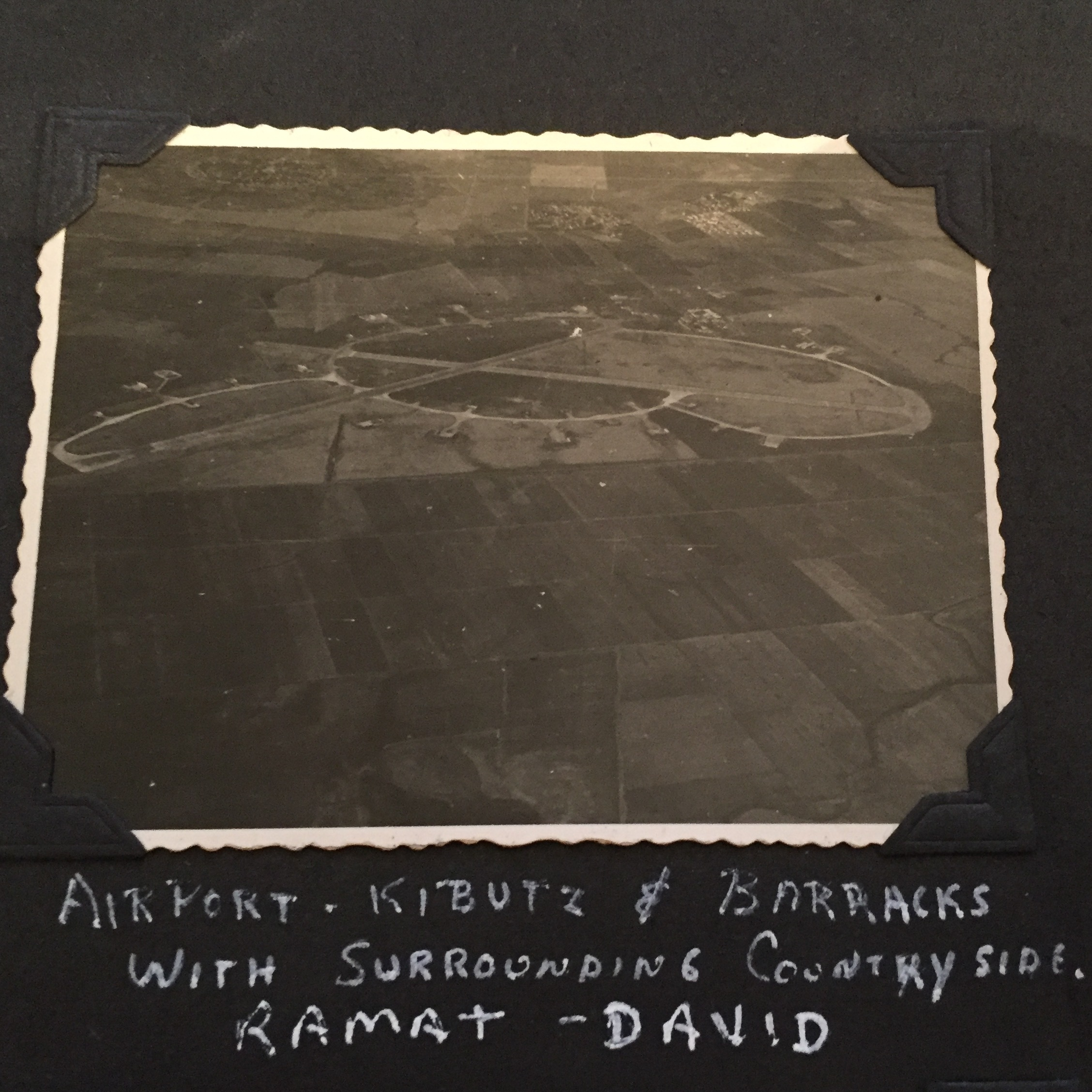
Aerial photo of the already Israeli airbase in 1949, taken from a B-17 Flying Fortress of the IAF

After the Israeli Declaration of Independence on 14 May 1948 and the start of the First Arab–Israeli War the next day, the base was temporarily maintained by the RAF to cover the withdrawal of British forces from Palestine. On 22 May 1948, the Royal Egyptian Air Force attacked the base, mistakenly believing it was now an Israeli controlled airbase. In a series of three attacks, several aircraft were destroyed or damaged, a hangar was destroyed, and four British airmen were killed. In the further course of the fighting, five Egyptian fighter planes (all British made) were shot down. The British were furious with their allies. A short time later the base was indeed taken over by the Israel Defense Forces (IDF).

=== Ramat David IAF Base ===
Over time, the Airbase was expanded to the main base of IAF operations north of Israel in Syria and Lebanon.

The 69 Squadron "Hammers" with three decommissioned B-17 Flying Fortress bombers smuggled from the US to Israel in 1948 was initially stationed here. This was done by the help of Charles Winters, a Miami businessman who was imprisoned for this and was posthumously pardoned by President George W. Bush in 2008.

The 103 Squadron "Elephants" with three DC-3 Dakota and one Douglas DC-5 transport aircraft was initially stationed here also, but both squadrons (69 and 103) were relocated to other Israeli bases in the following years.

The future Israeli president Ezer Weizman (1924–2005) was squadron and base commander at Ramat David in the 1950s before he finally took over command of the IAF. In 2011 the base' Wing 1 there was named after him (see photos in gallery below).

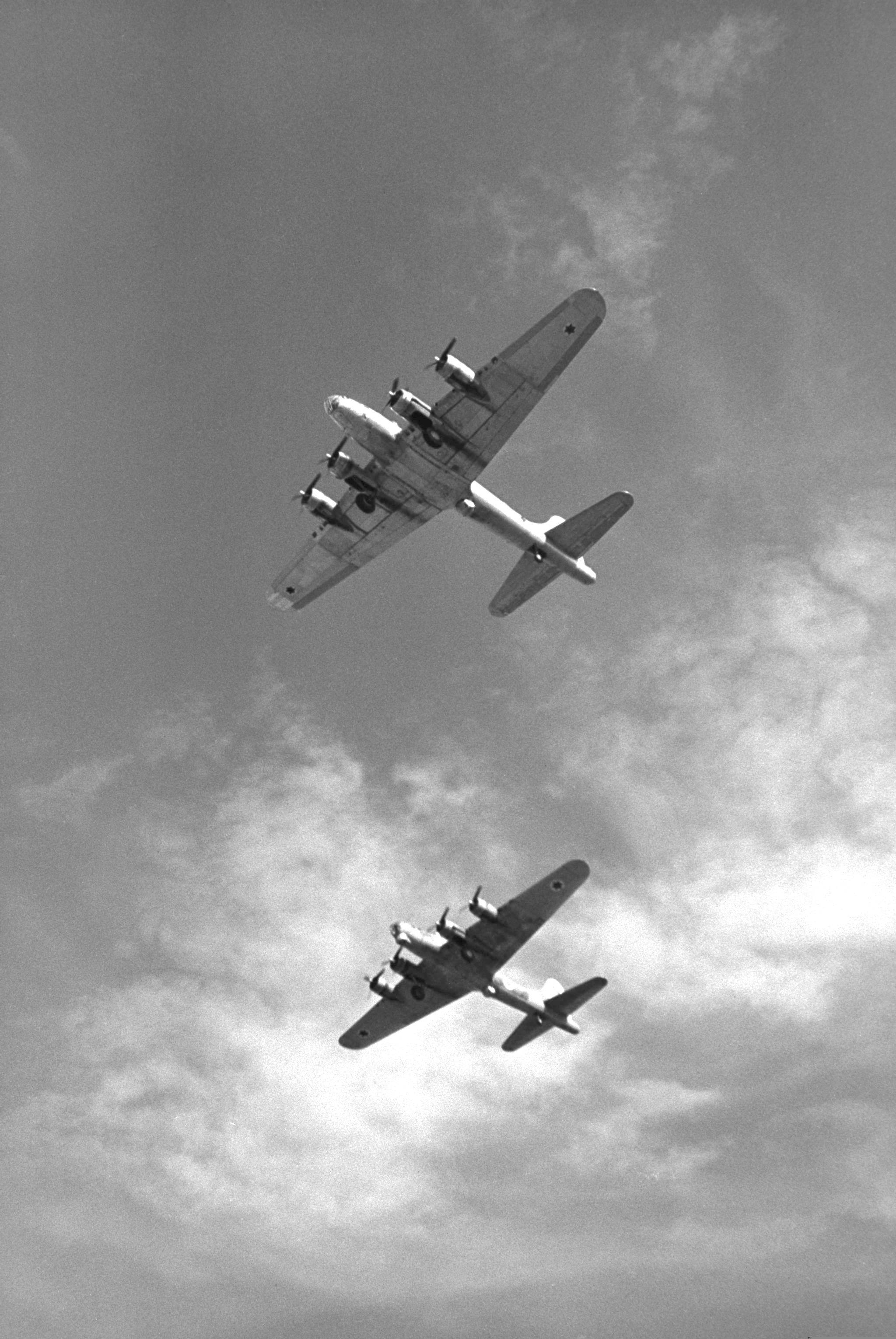
Two Israeli B-17 Flying Fortress of 69 Squadron "Hammers" – in 1953, no longer at Ramat David

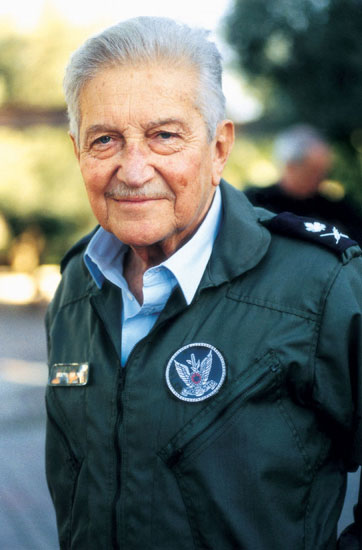
Ezer Weizman (1924–2005), former commander of Ramat David Airbase, the IAF and president of Israel

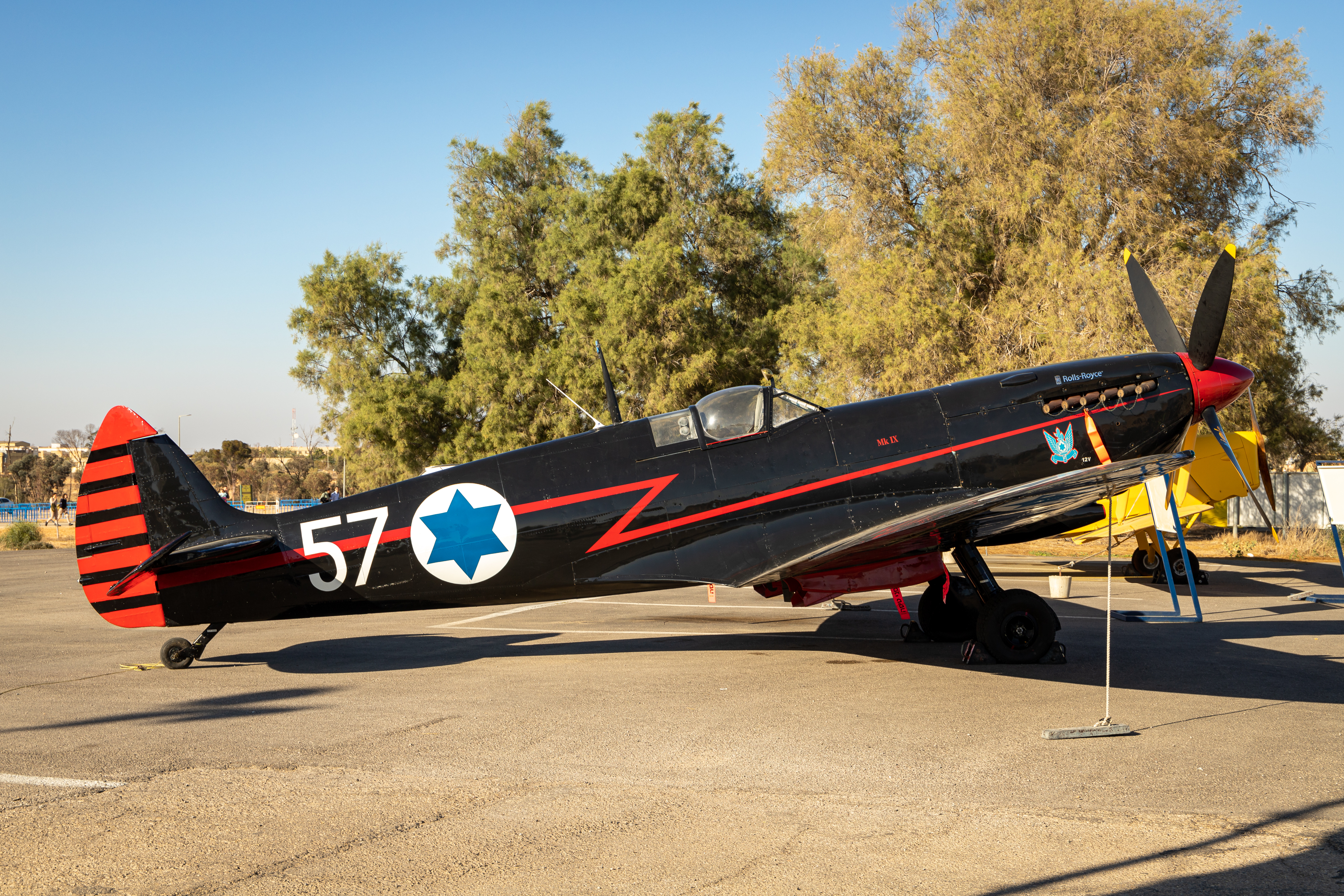
The famous and airworthy "Black Spitfire", which was privately owned by Ezer Weizmann

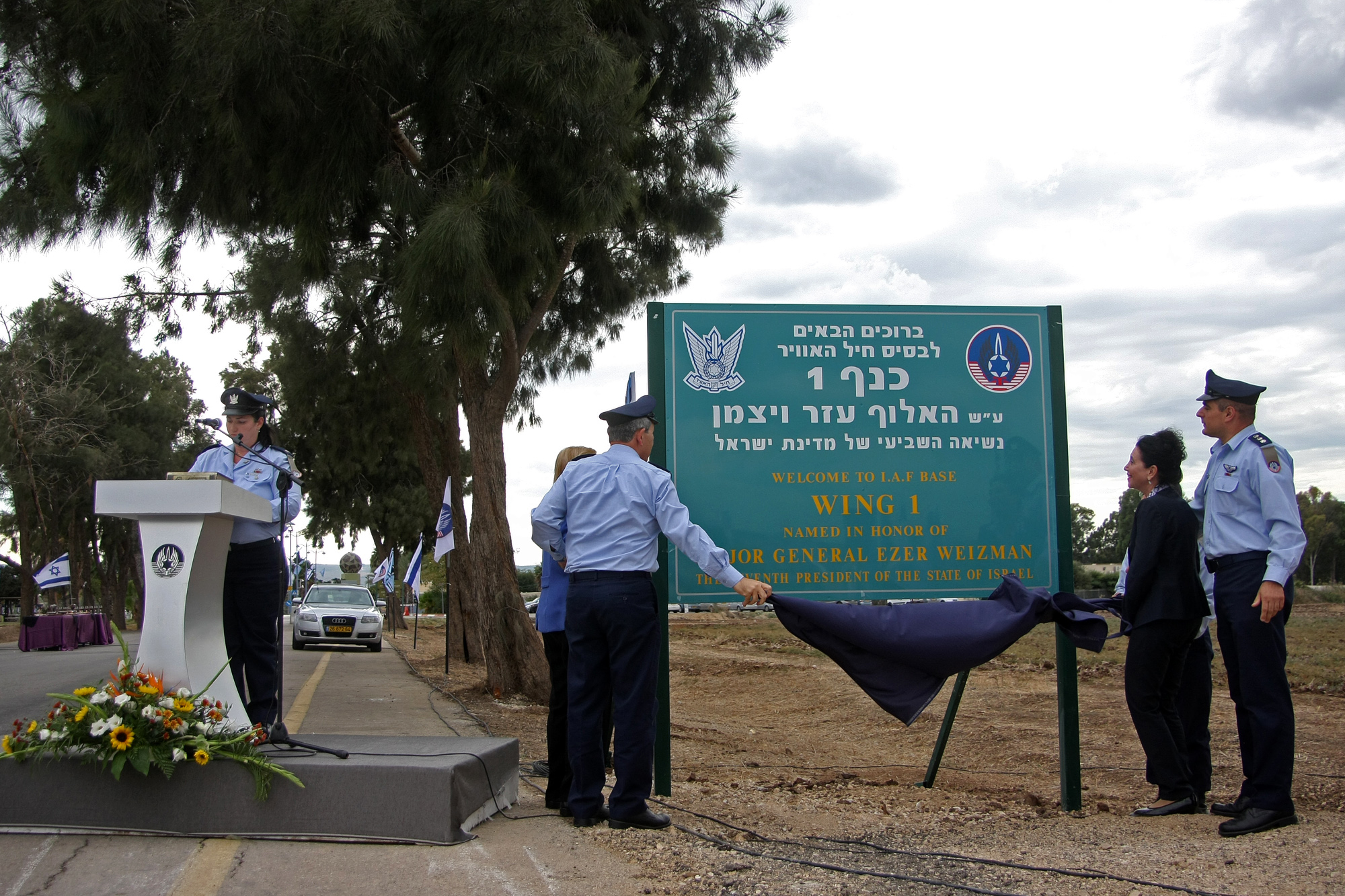
IAF Base Wing 1 on Ramat David was named after the late Major General Ezer Weizman in 2011

A brief historical summary of the aircraft squadrons currently and recently stationed at Ramat David:

==== 101 Squadron "First Fighter" – active ====

The 101 Squadron is Israel's "First Fighter" squadron, formed on 20 May 1948, six days after Israel declared its independence. Initially flying the Avia S-199, it has since operated the Supermarine Spitfire, North American Mustang, Dassault Mystere IV, Dassault Mirage IIICJ, IAI Nesher, IAI Kfir and F-16C Barak. It has taken part in combat operations in all of Israel's wars and conflicts. In 2021 it relocated from Hatzor Airbase to Ramat David.

==== 105 Squadron "Scorpion" – active ====
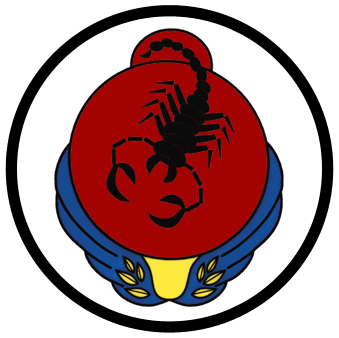

The 105 Squadron "Scorpion" was founded in December 1950 as a Spitfire squadron. It has since operated the North American P-51 Mustang, Dassault Super Mystère, IAI Sa'ar (upgraded Super Mystère), McDonnell Douglas F-4 Phantom II Kurnas and F-16C/D Barak on other airbases. The name "Scorpion" is intended to refer to a ground attack aircraft. In 2021 the squadron was relocated to Ramat David where it is based until the present day.

==== 109 Squadron "The Valley" – active ====

The 109 Squadron "The Valley" was established in 1951 under a different name at Tel Nof Airbase and moved to Ramat David in 1956, where it still exists today. It got its name “The Valley” after the Jezreel Valley where the base is located. At Ramat David it flew the Dassault Mystère IV A, Douglas A-4H/N Skyhawk Ayit, IAI Kfir C.7 and finally from 1991 to the present day the two-seater General Dynamics F-16D Barak as a strike fighter jet.

==== 110 Squadron "Knights Of The North" – closed ====
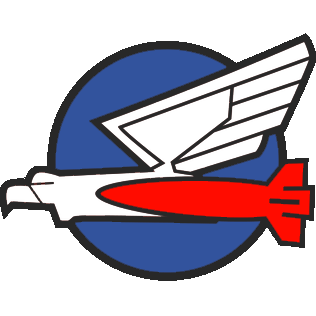

The 110 Squadron "Knights Of The North" was established at Hatzor Airbase in 1953 and relocated to Ramat David in 1957. It flew the De Havilland Mosquito at Chazor, and subsequently the following types at Ramat David: S.O. 4050 Vautour IIA/B, Gloster Meteor F.8, Douglas A-4H/N Skyhawk Ayit, General Dynamics F-16A/B Netz, F-16C/D Barak and – together with 117 Squadron – took part in the destruction of the Iraqi nuclear reactor in 1981. It was finally shut down in 2017.

==== 117 Squadron "First Jet" – moved ====
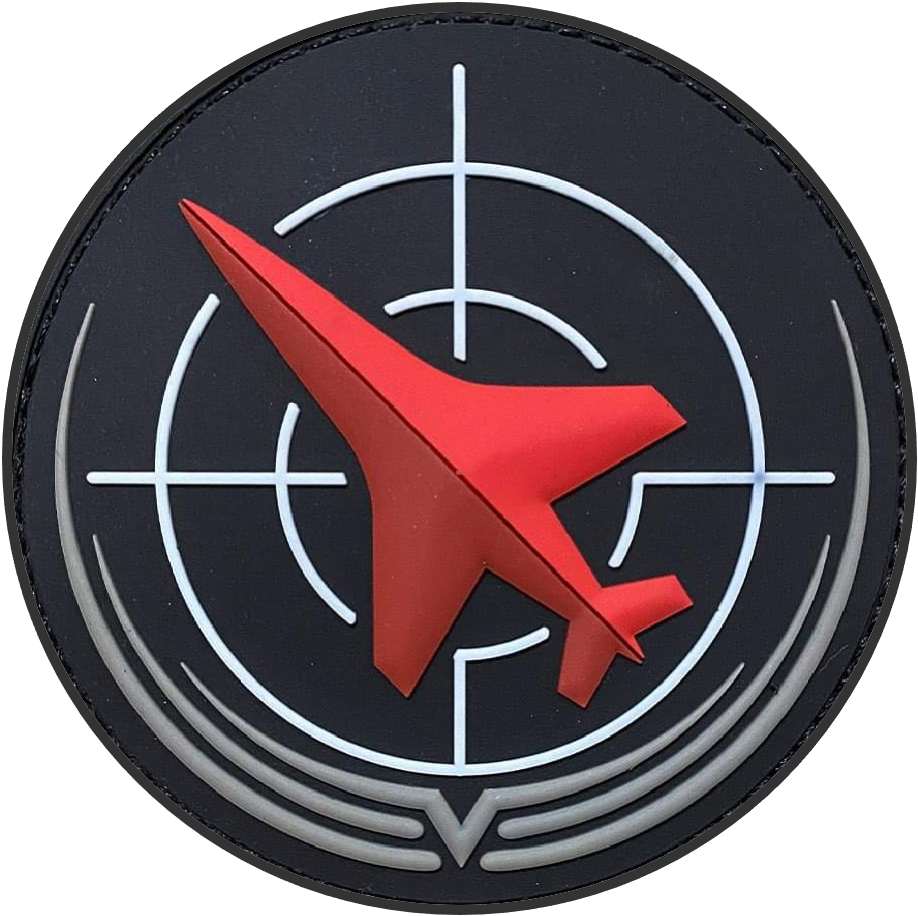

The 117 Squadron "First Jet" was inaugurated on 17 June 1953 as the IAF's first fighter jet squadron with British Gloster Meteor at Ramat David. In 1962 these were replaced by French Dassault Mirage IIICJ Shahak, which then took part in the Six-Day War, the War of Attrition and the Yom Kippur War. In 1980, together with the 110 Squadron, they received the first F-16A/B Netz fighter jets from the USA. In June 1981, four jets from 117 Squadron took part in Operation Opera, the destruction of the Iraqi nuclear reactor Osirak near Baghdad. From 1986/87 these were then replaced by the IAF's first F-16C/D Barak, which remained until the squadron was temporarily closed in 2020 . On 1 July 2021, the 117 Squadron was reactivated at Nevatim Airbase with F-35I jets.

==== Gallery of formerly stationed aircraft ====
Most of the aircraft types are now at the IAF Museum adjacent to Hatzerim Airbase:

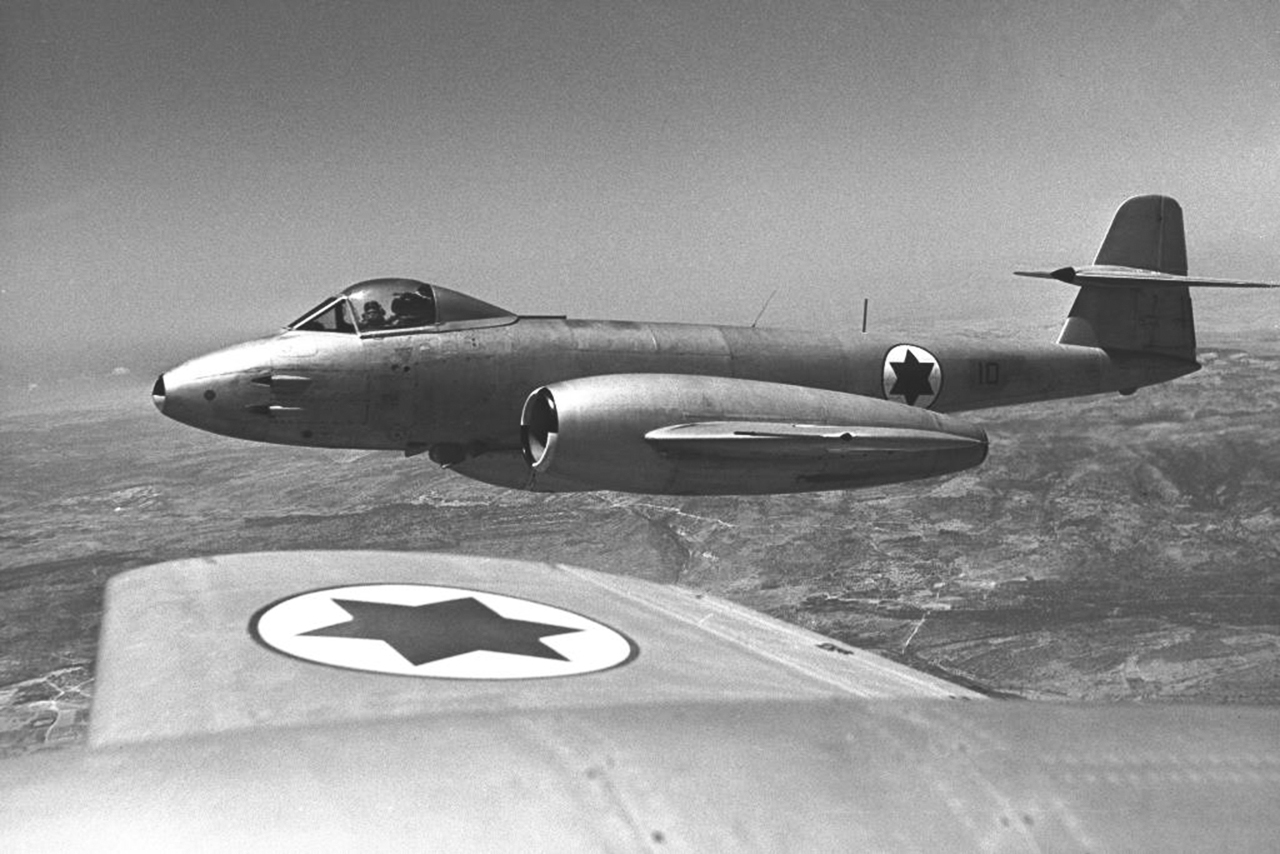
Single-seat Gloster Meteor F.8 jet of 117 Squadron "First Jet" in flight, of Ramat David in July 1954

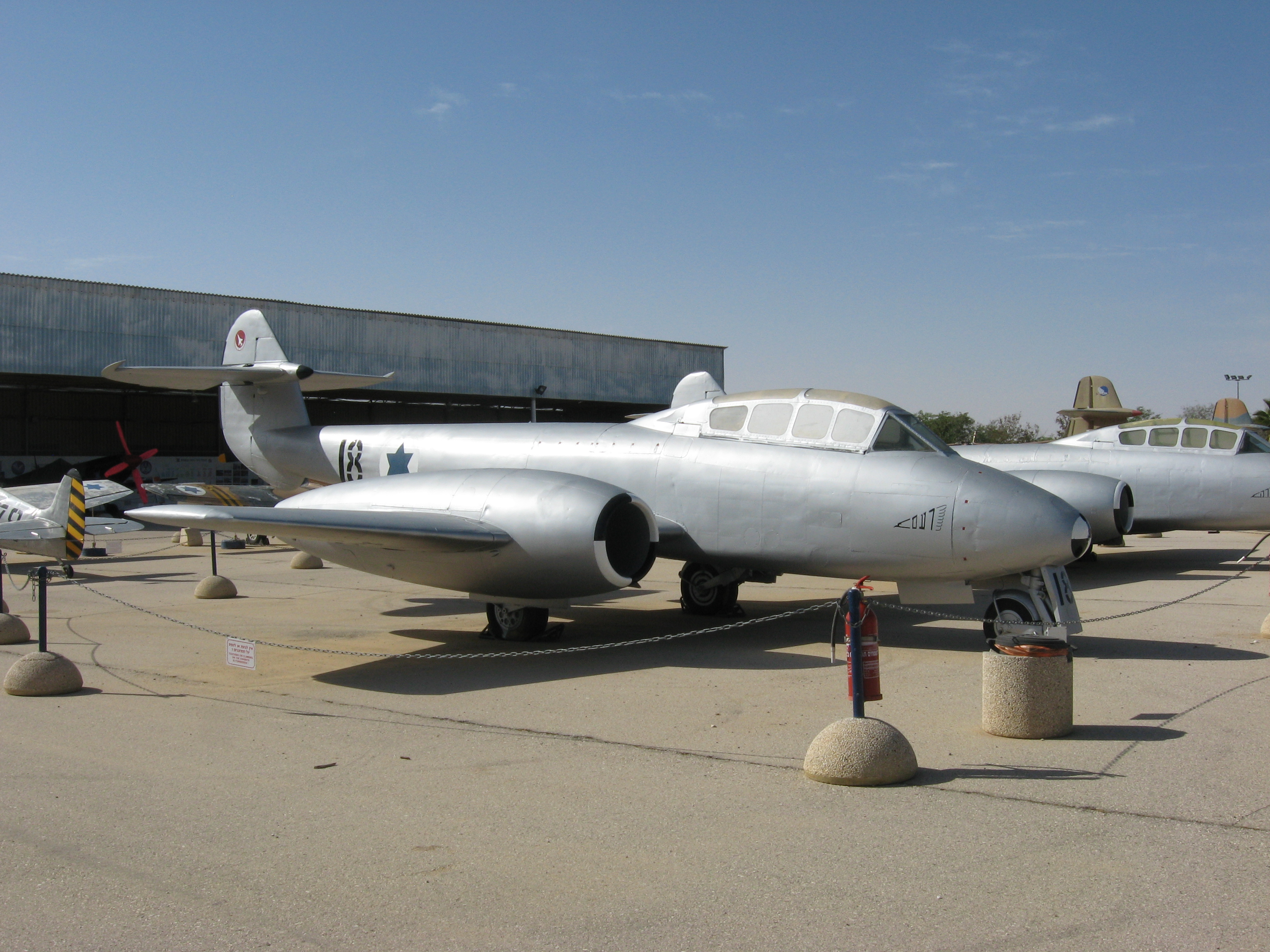
Two two-seater Gloster Meteor T.7 jet trainer for 117 Squadron "First Jet" of the IAF Flight Academy in the 1950s

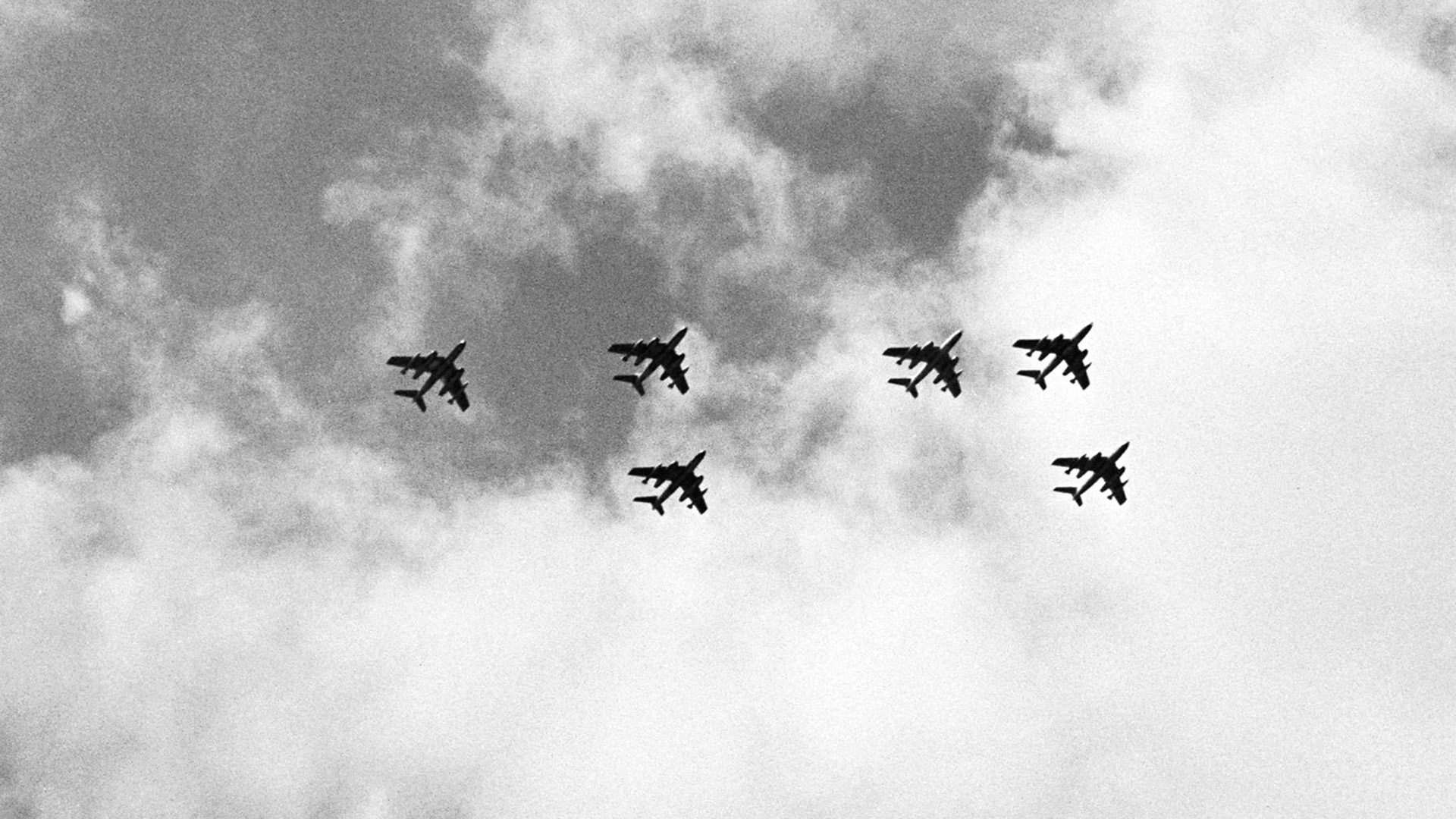
Several S.O. 4050 Vautour jets of Ramat David in formation over Haifa on Independence Day in 1963

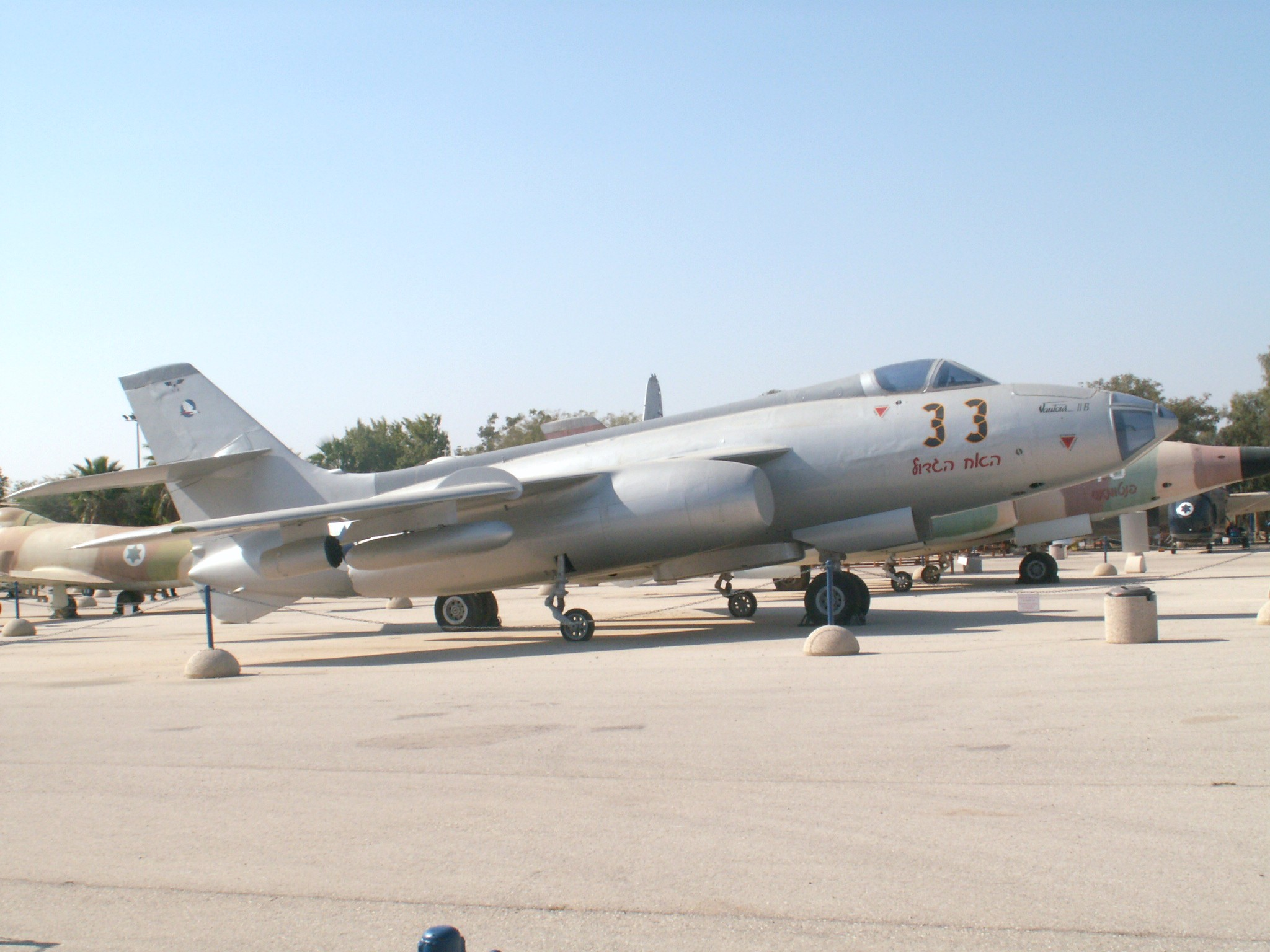
A two-seat S.O. 4050 Vautour IIB bomber of 110 Squadron "Knights Of The North" at Ramat David, 1957

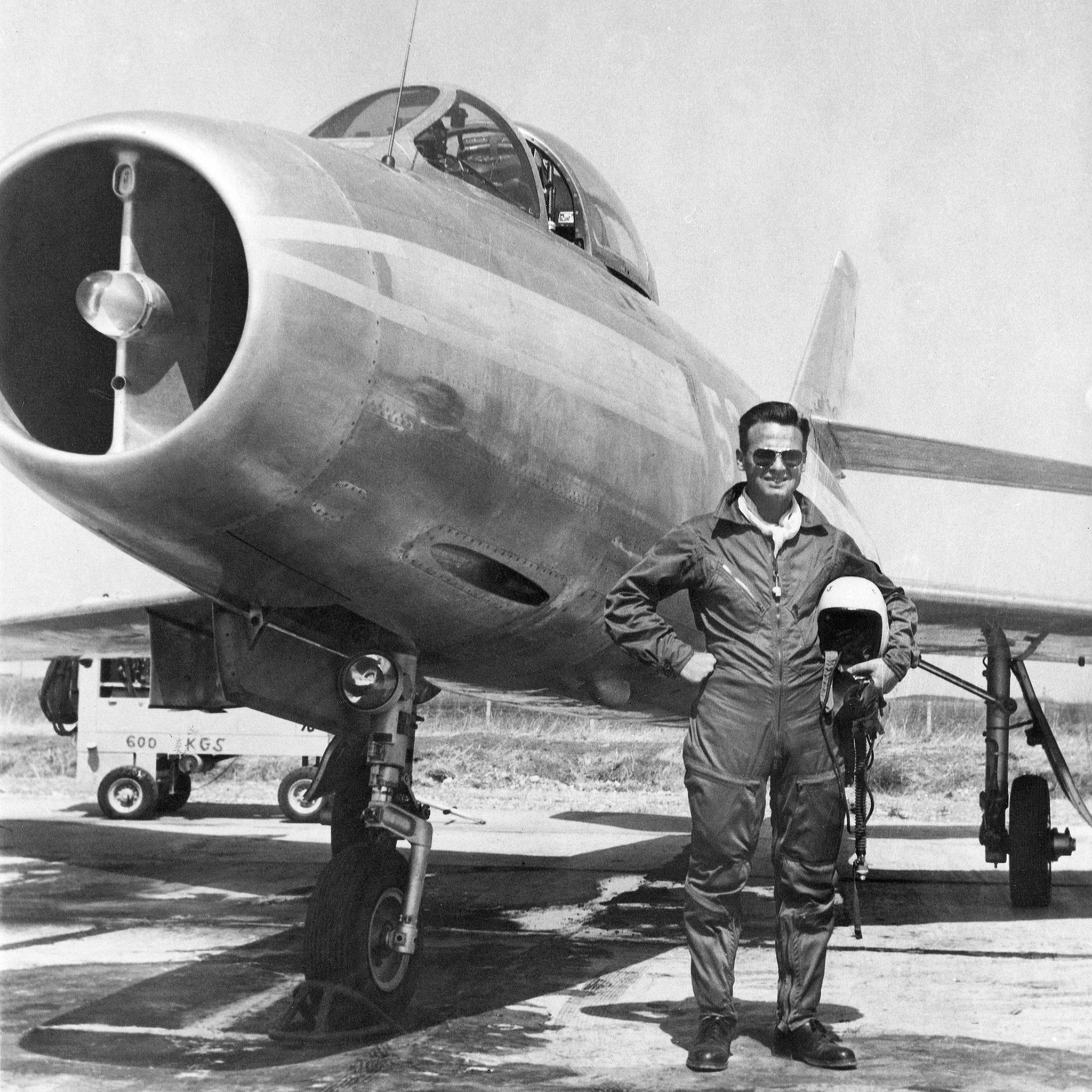
IAF chief test pilot Danny Shapira in front of a new Dassault Mystère IV A in June 1956, also at Ramat David

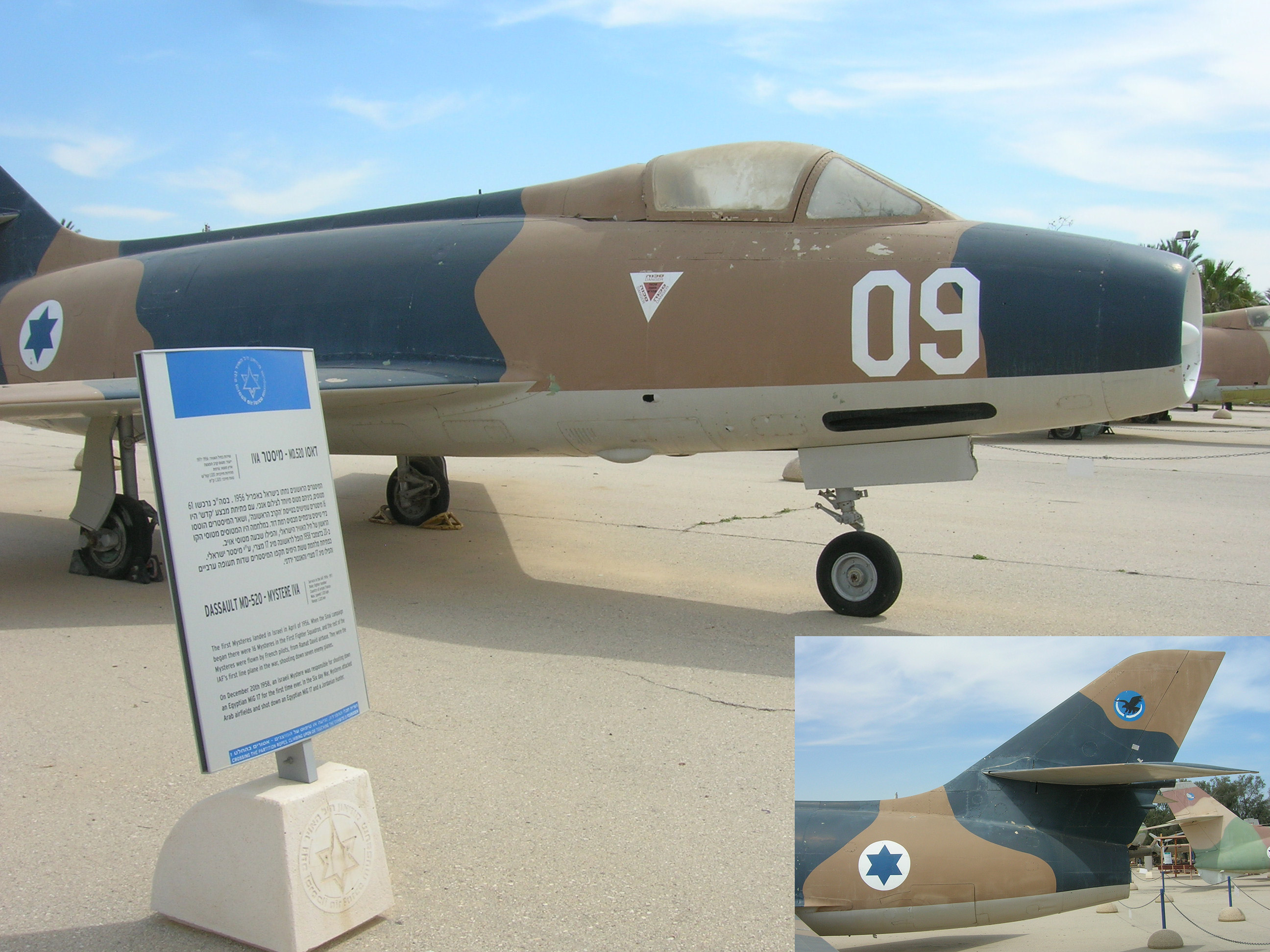
A Dassault Mystère IV A jet of 109 Squadron "The Valley" at Ramat David Airbase from 1956

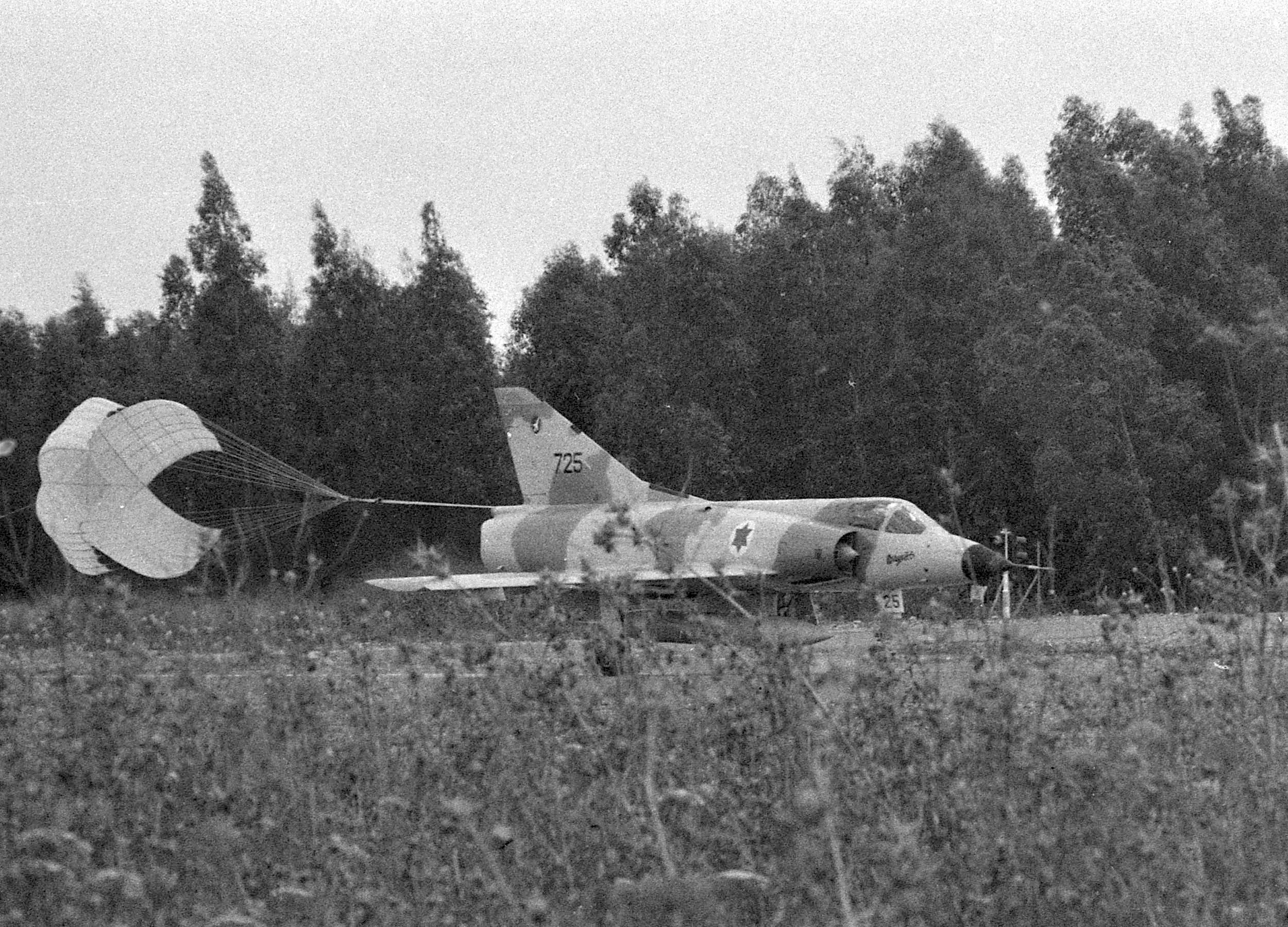
A Dassault Mirage IIICJ Shahak of 117 Squadron "First Jet" is landing at Ramat David Airbase in 1970

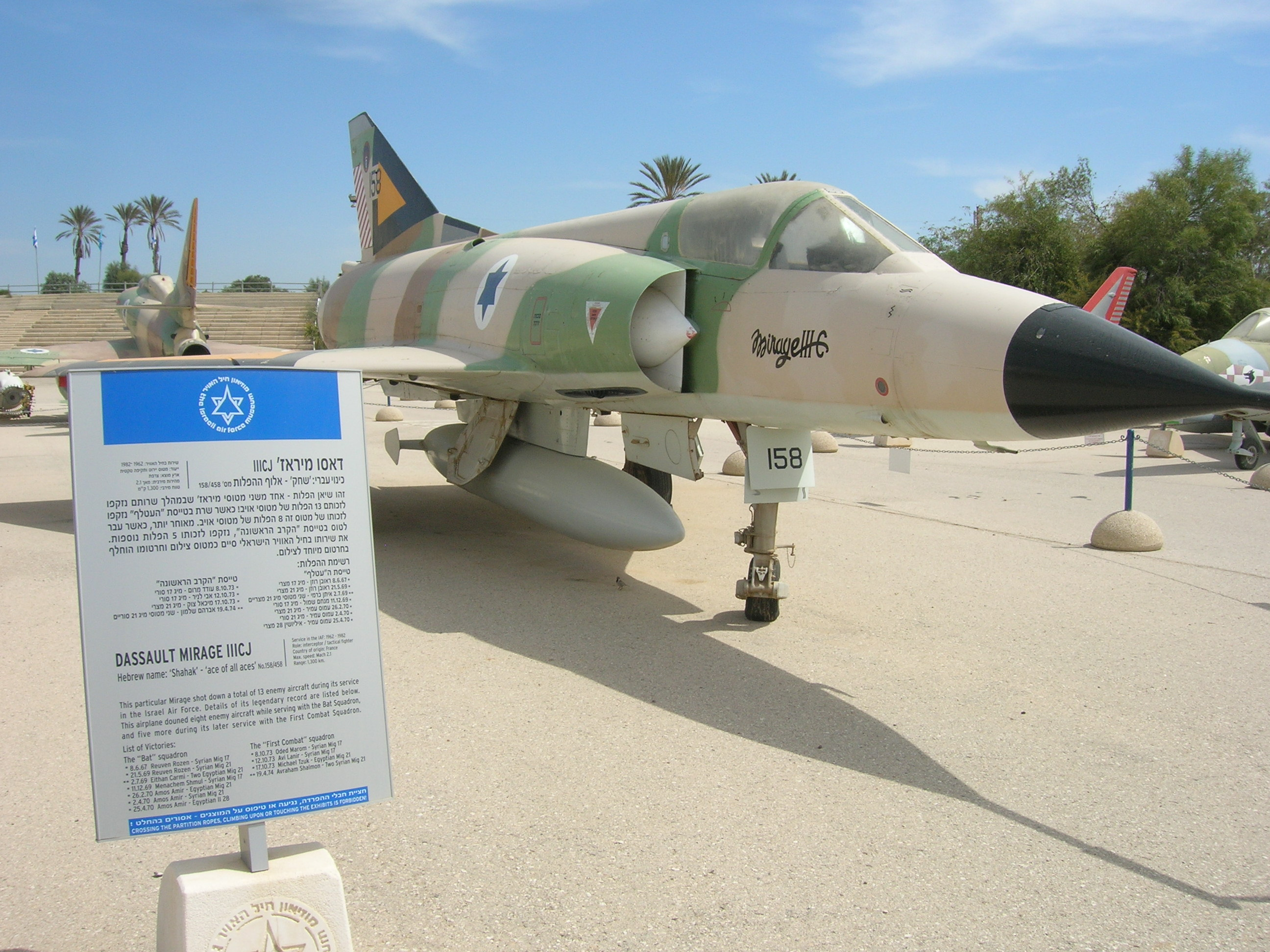
A Dassault Mirage IIICJ Shahak of 101 Squadron "First Fighter", also in a squadron at Ramat David

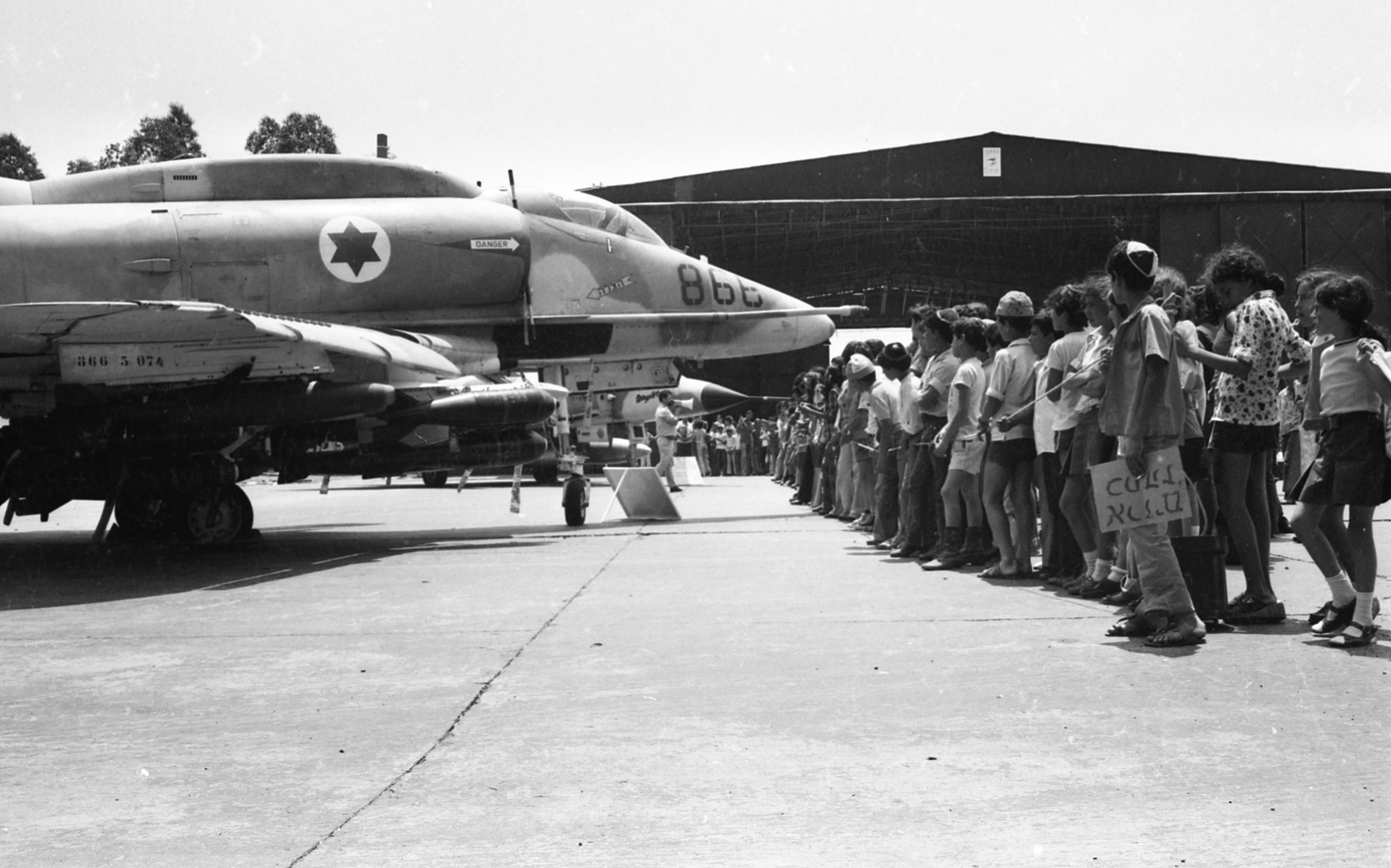
A-4N Skyhawk Ayit of 110 Squadron "Knights Of The North" at Ramat David, after Ma'alot massacre 1974

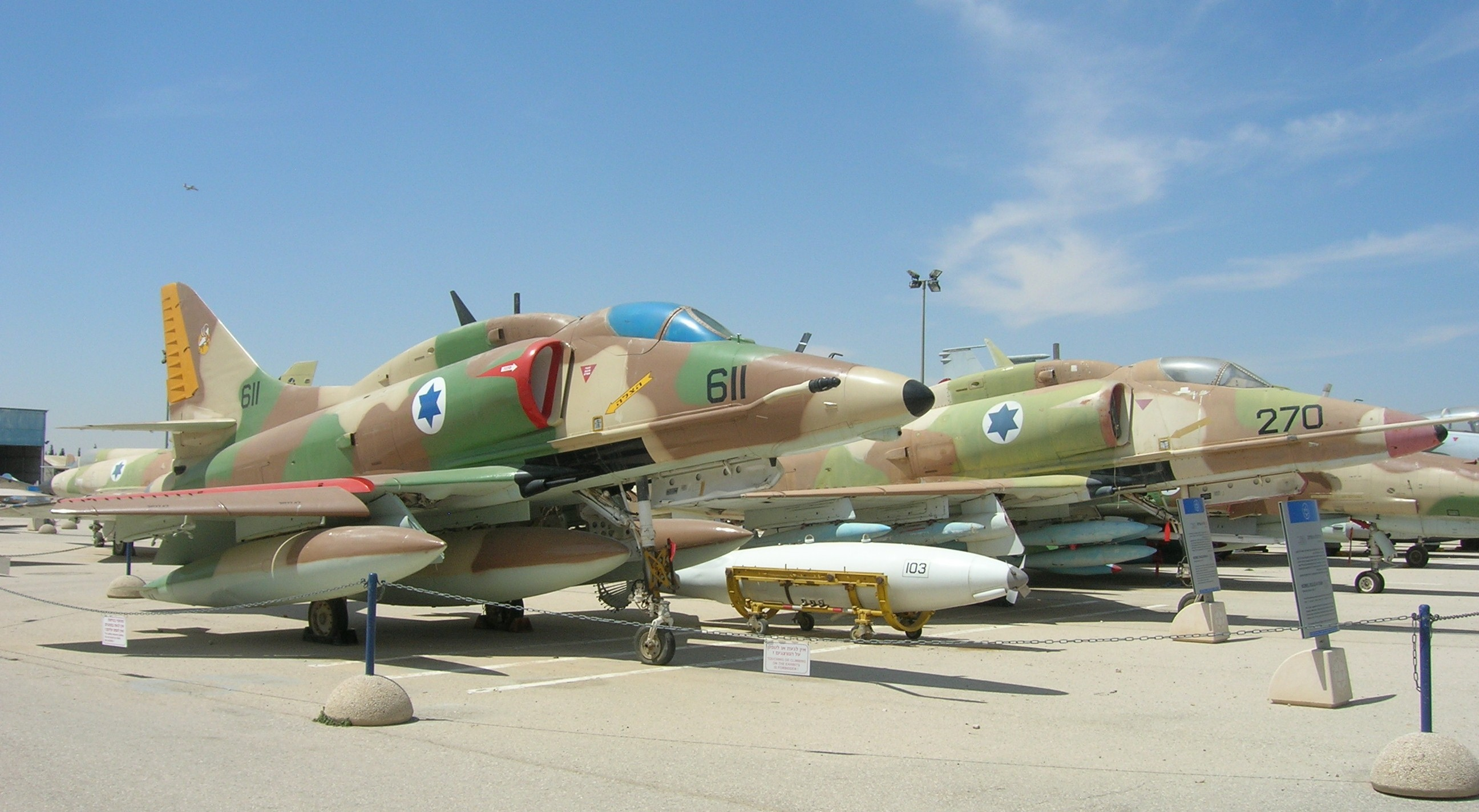
Two A-4 Skyhawk Ayit, A-4N and A-4H (left to right), 147 Squadron "Goring Ram" – also at Ramat David

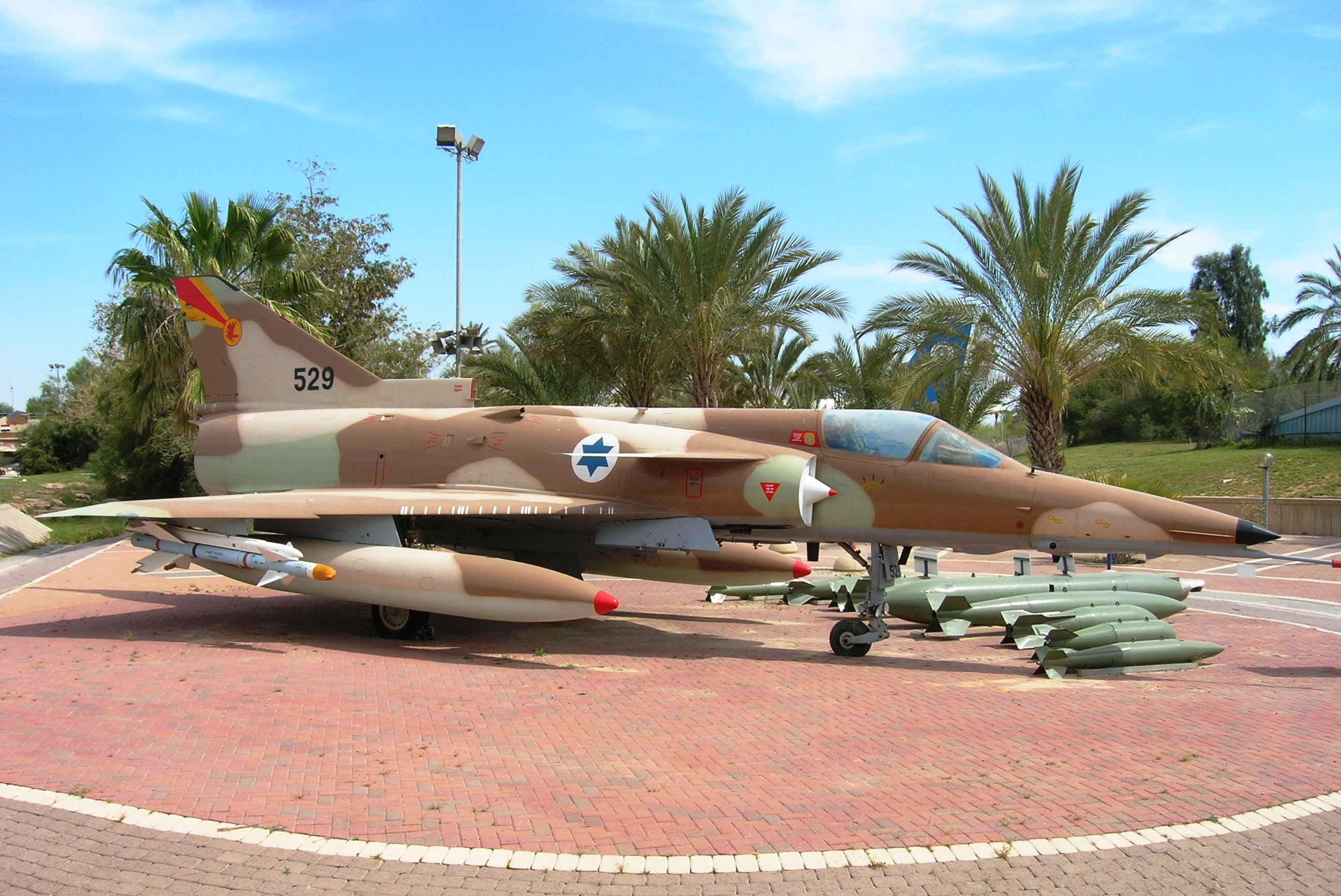
An Israeli-made IAI Kfir C.7 of 144 Squadron "Phoenix" with various weapons – also at Ramat David

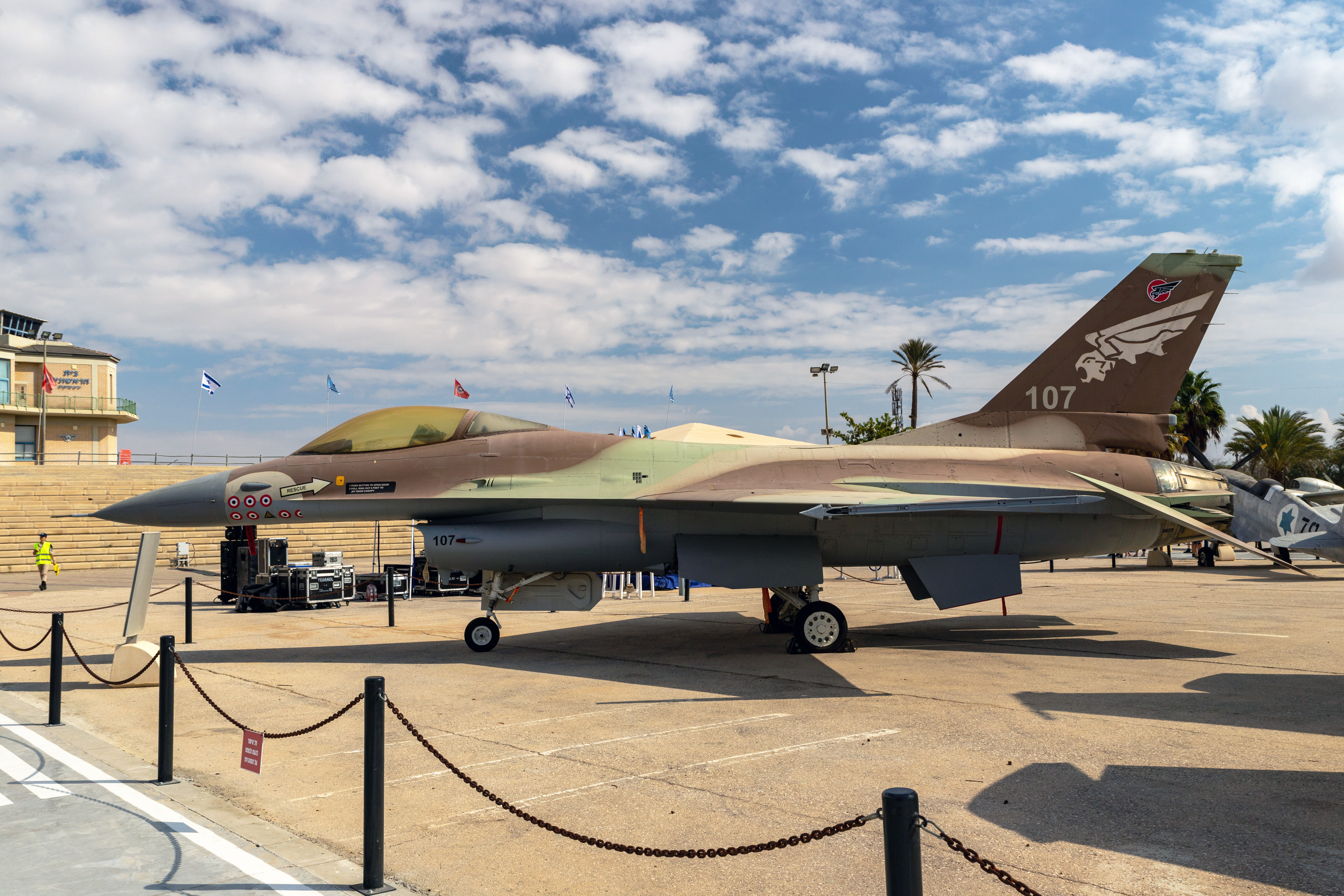
F-16A Netz #107 with kill markings of 116 Squadron "Defenders Of The South" – also at Ramat David

==== Underground hangars ====
The fighter jets are housed in large underground hangar systems and shelters into which they disappear after each landing and which have several entrances and exits. This protects them from missiles and at the same time hides them from view and precise localization. Syria and Lebanon are only 50 to 60 kilometers away, from where rockets are repeatedly fired at northern Israel. During the Yom Kippur War in 1973, this airbase was the only one where rockets hit and not only destroyed facilities but also caused casualties.

Since the onset of direct attacks between Israel and Iran in April 2024 (see: April 2024 Iranian strikes on Israel), Ramat David has had to anticipate coming under rocket fire from that quarter as well – something that has indeed occurred.

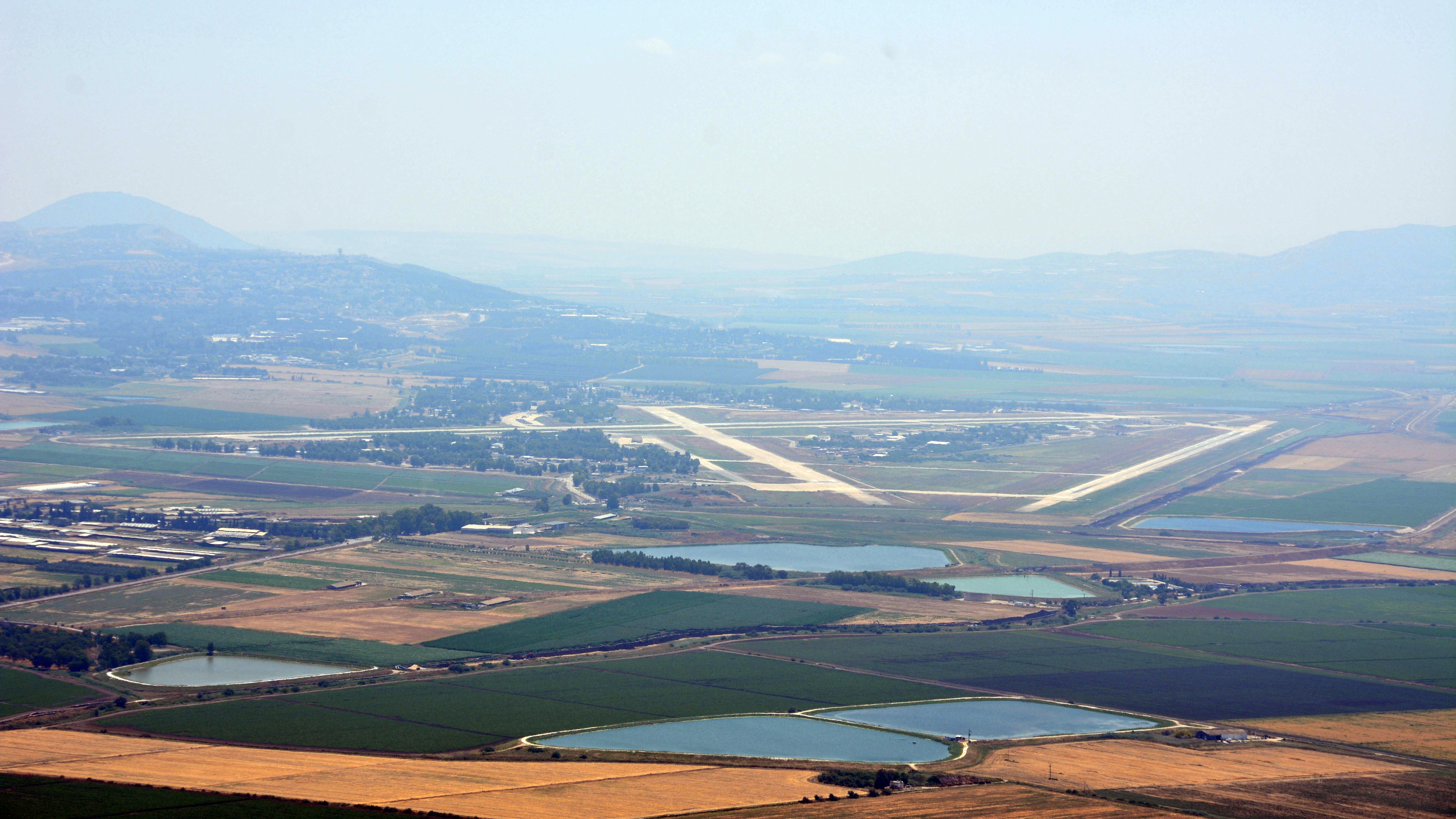
Ramat David Airbase seen from Mount Carmel, looking east-southeast, June 2019

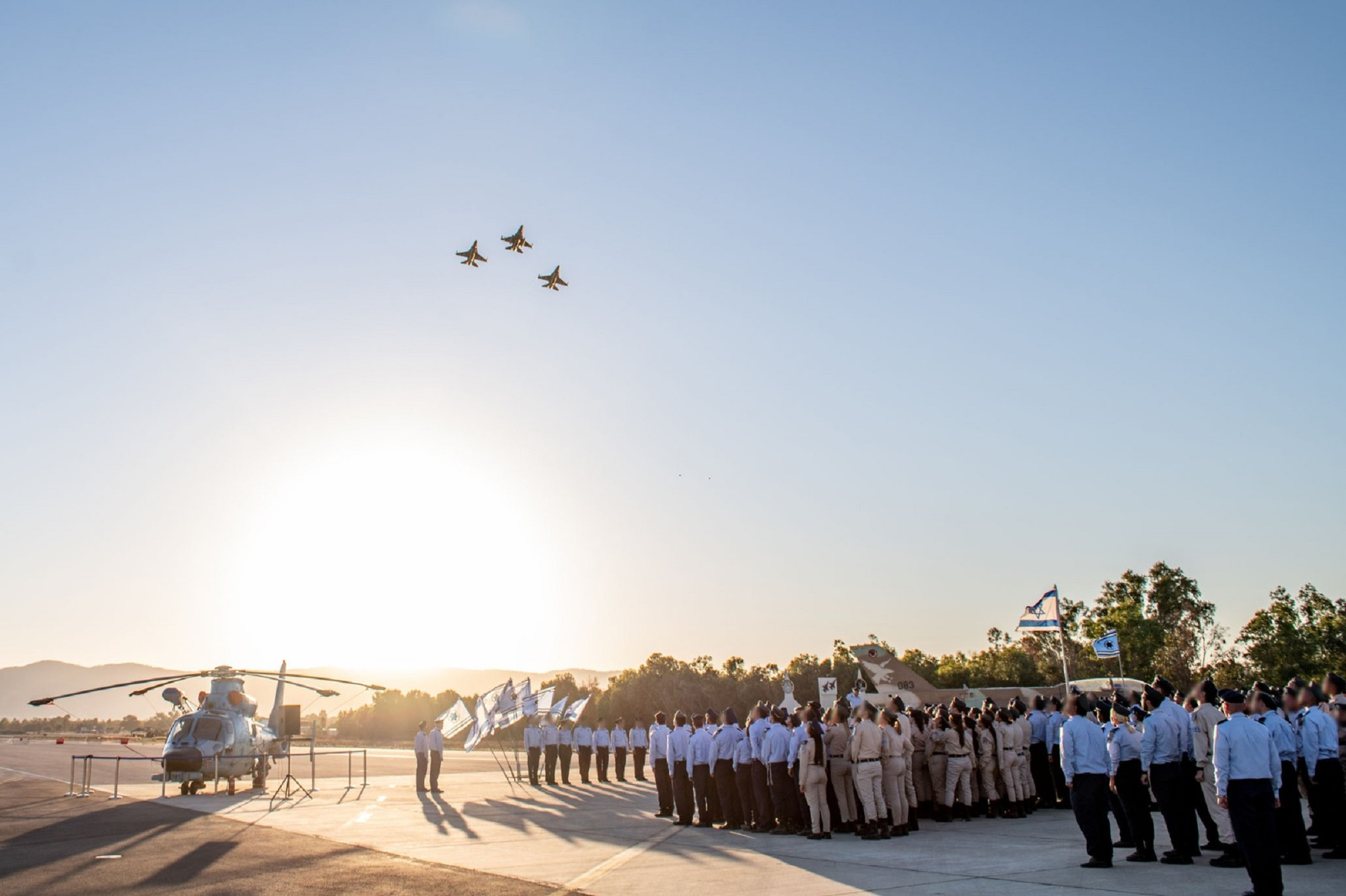
Change of command ceremony at Ramat David Airbase in July 2022

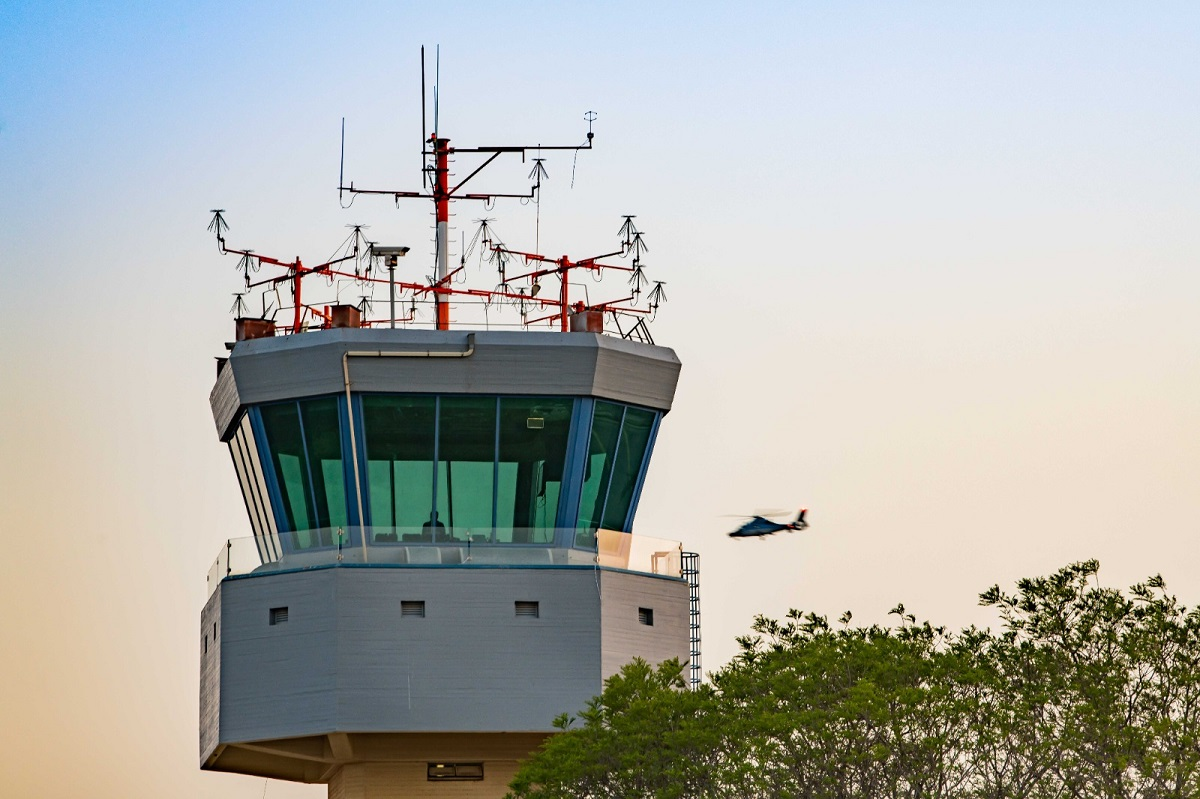
ATC Tower at Ramat David Airbase in August 2023 with an AS565 Panther Atalef flying by

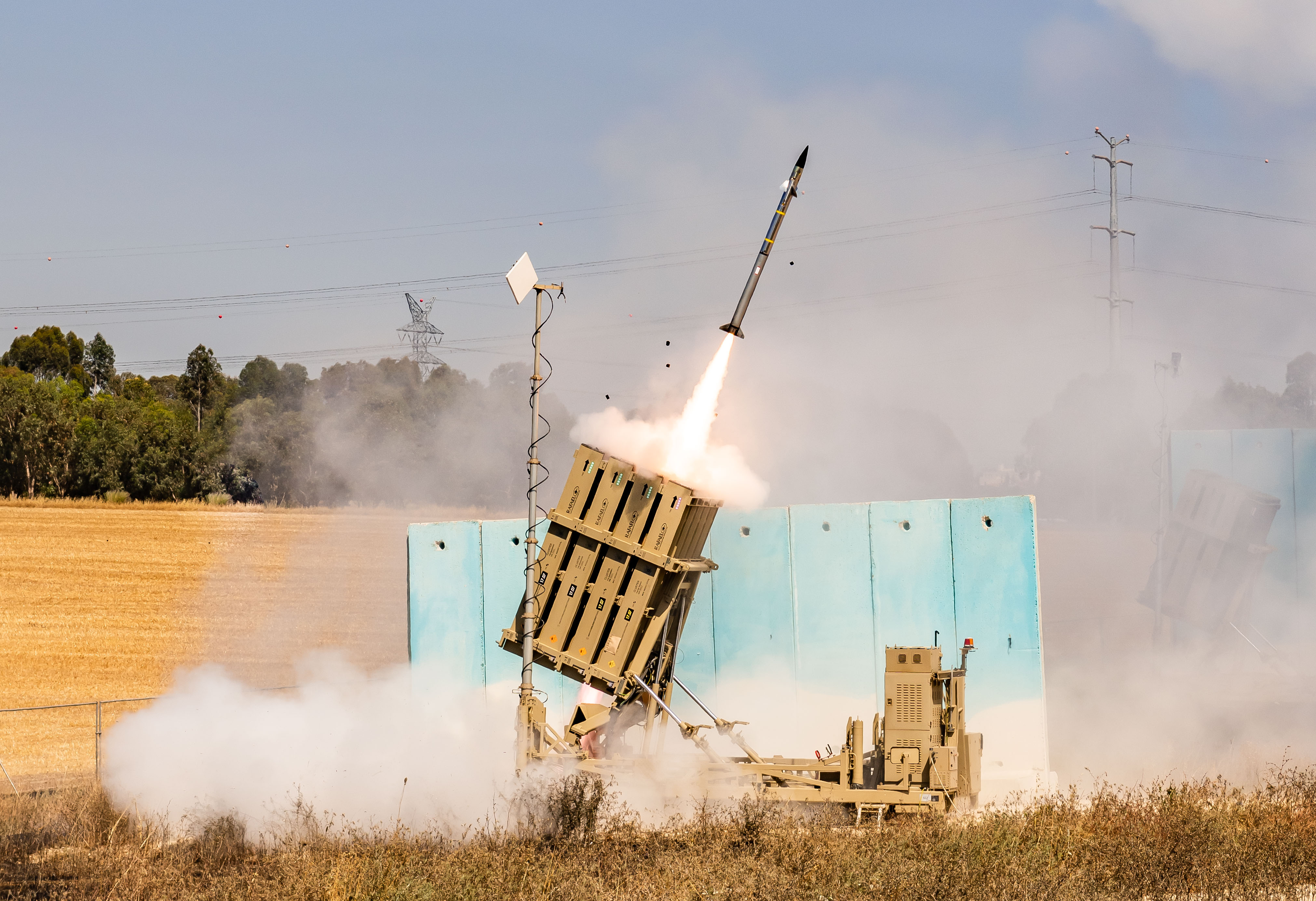
The Iron Dome defense system, also stationed at Ramat David, is intended to protect against rockets

== Today ==
=== F-16 fighter jets ===
At the beginning of October 2020, as part of an IAF efficiency program, the 117 Squadron "First Jet" with F-16 fighter jets on Ramat David was disbanded and most of the jets and pilots were assigned to other units. It was involved in all of the country's wars since 1953 and, among other things, also involved in Operation Opera, the destruction of an unfinished Iraqi nuclear reactor in 1981. In July 2021, the squadron reopened at Nevatim Airbase with new F-35I Adir jets.

From March 2021, the two F-16 Squadrons 101 "First Fighter" and 105 "Scorpion" were gradually relocated here from Hatzor Airbase to bring all remaining F-16C/D Barak jets under one roof. They were united with 109 Squadron "The Valley" of F-16D machines. Three squadrons with the newer F-16I Sufa, adapted to Israeli needs, are based at Ramon Airbase, as well as a fourth squadron of them at Hatzerim Airbase.

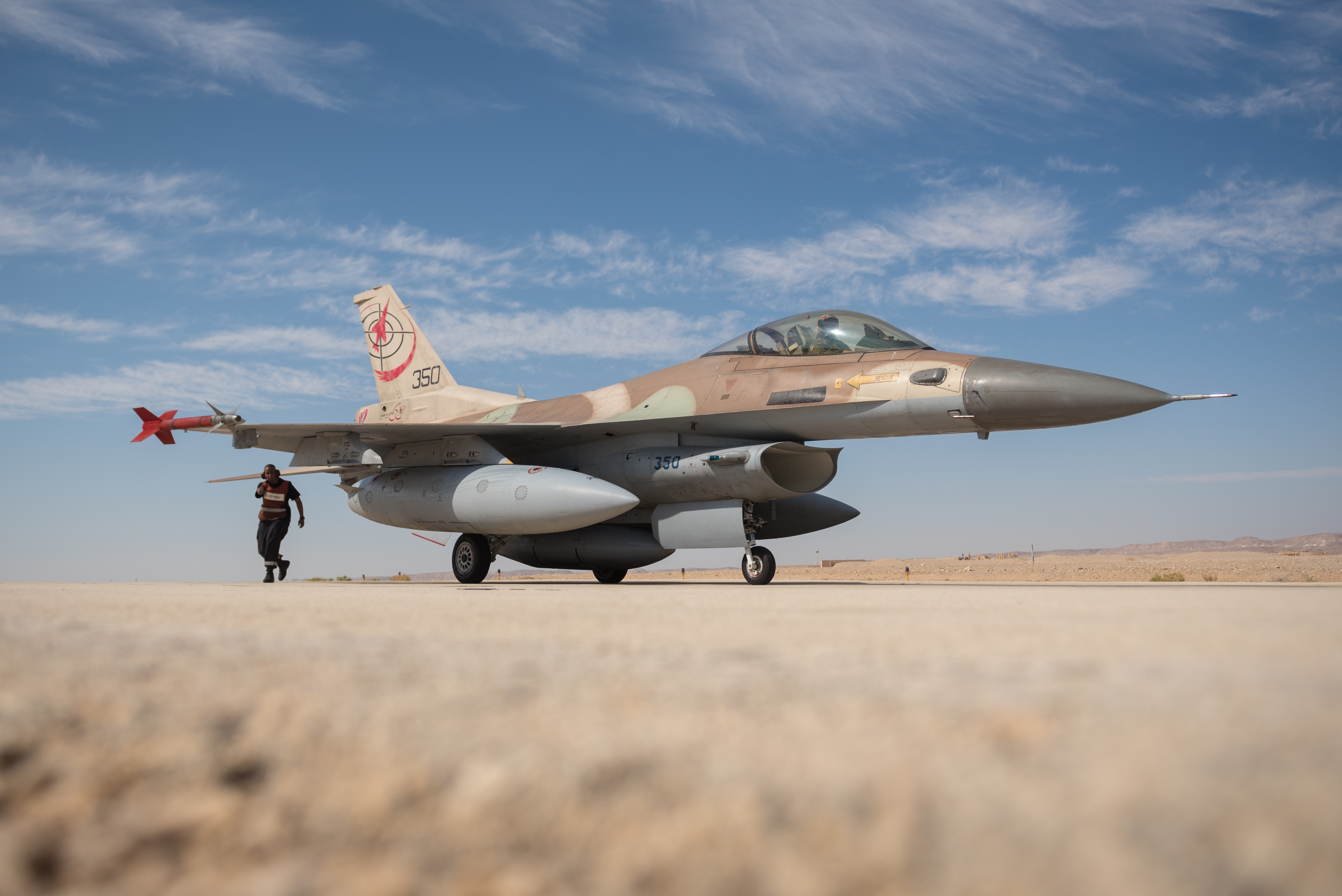
An F-16C Barak from 117 Squadron "First Jet" at Blue Flag in 2017, disbanded at Ramat David in 2020

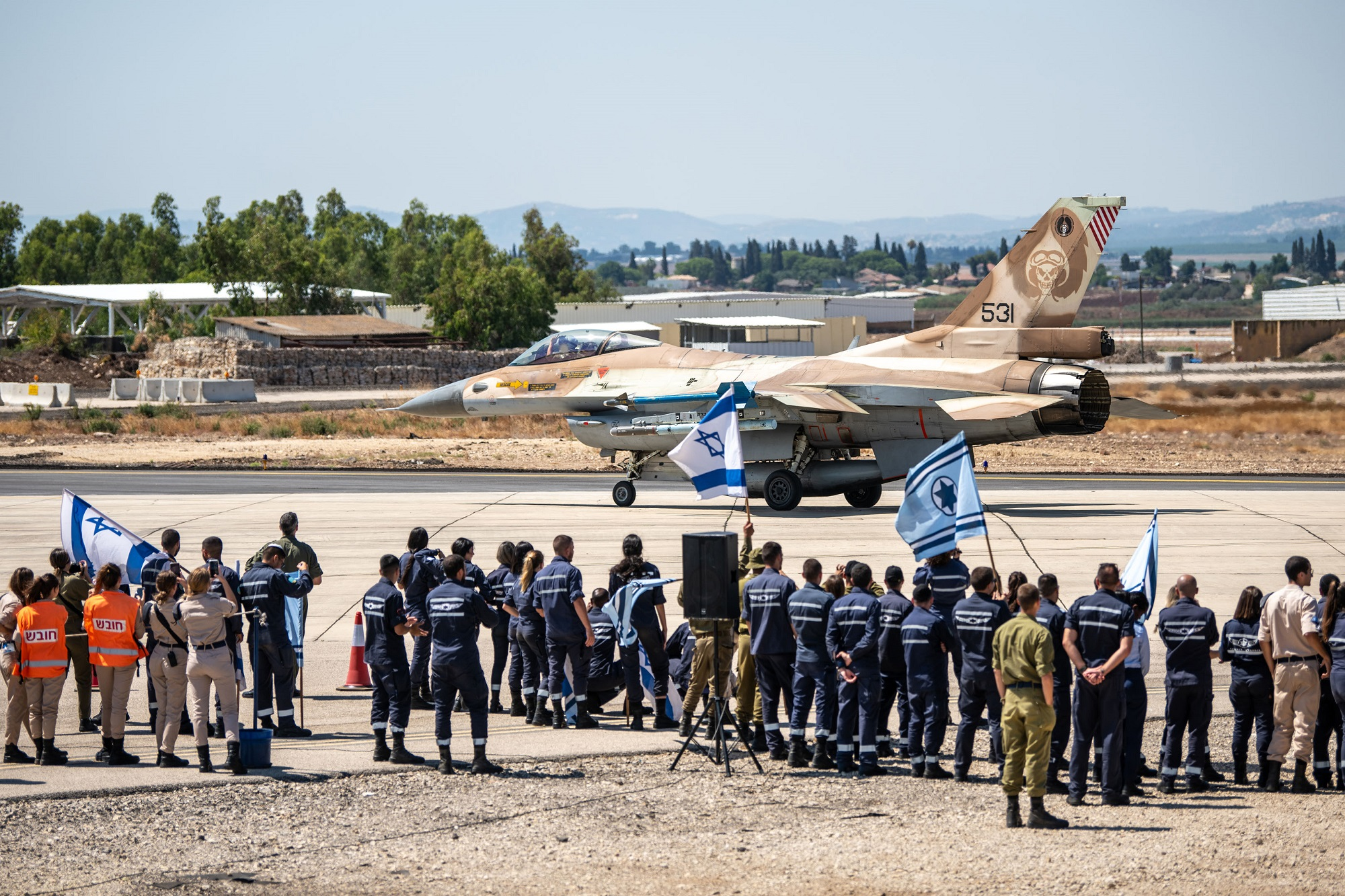
Relocation of 101 Squadron "First Fighter" with F-16C jets from Hatzor Airbase to Ramat David in 2021

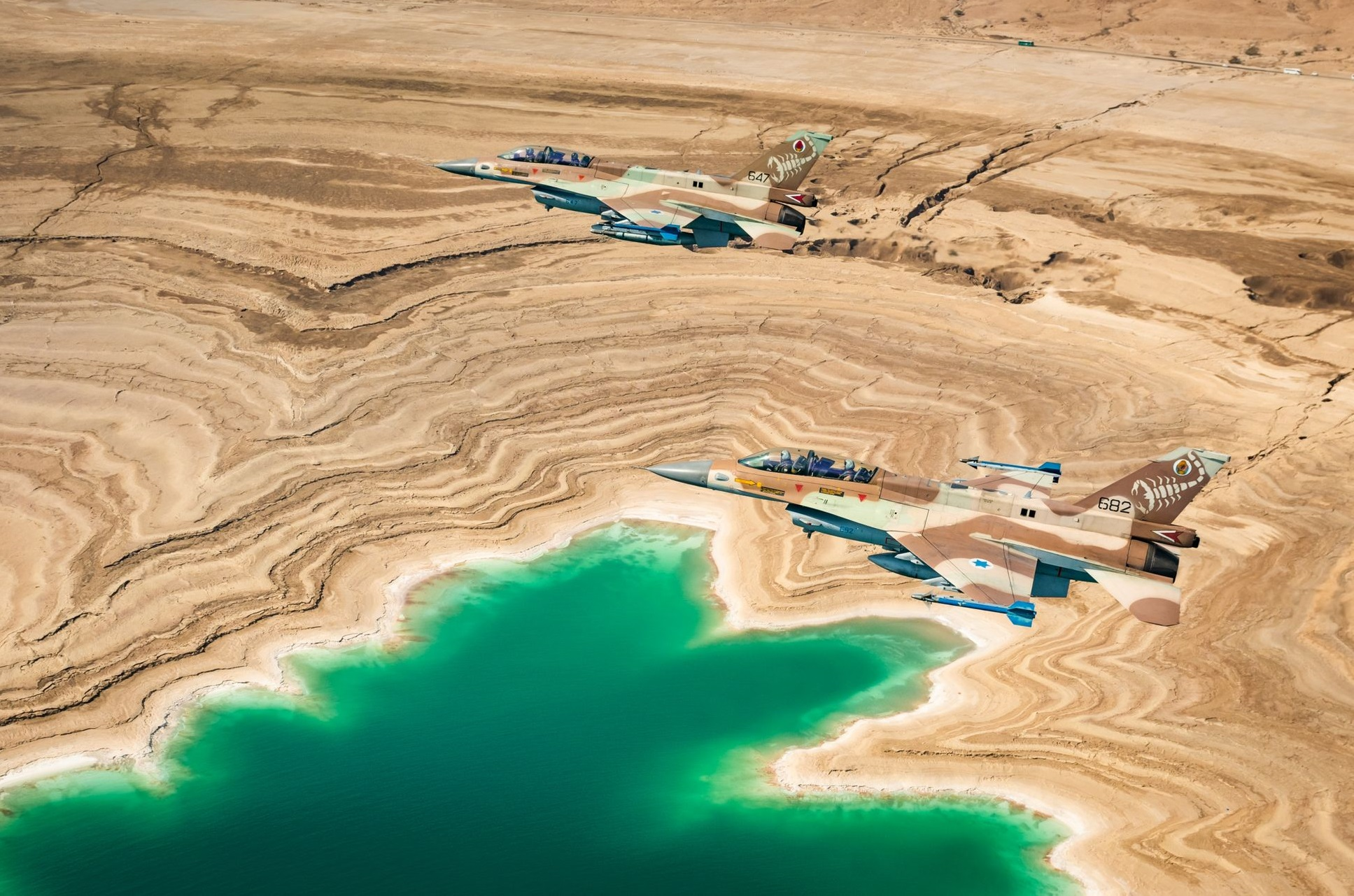
Two F-16D Barak from 105 Squadron "Scorpion" flying over the Dead Sea in October 2022

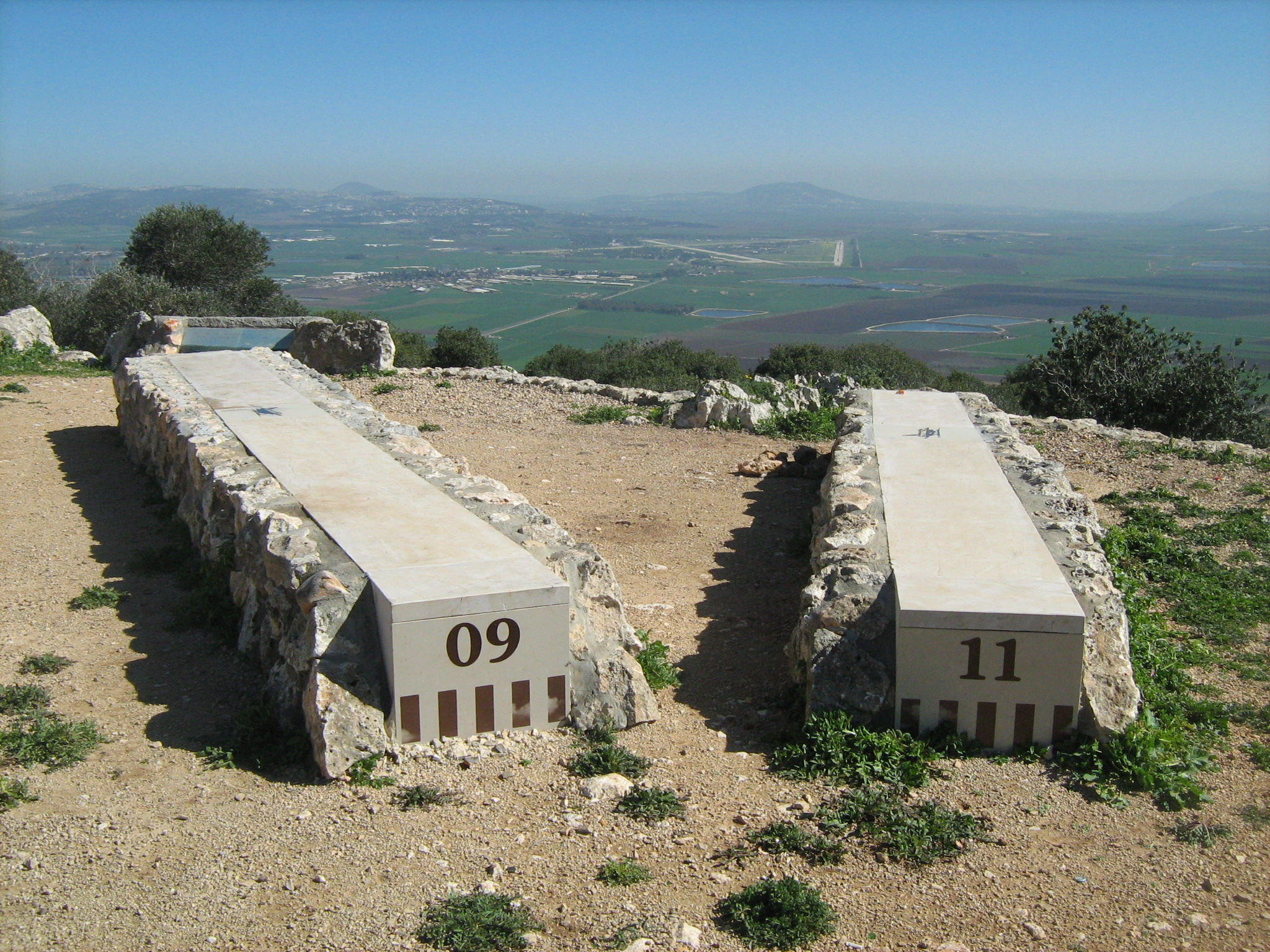
View from 109 Squadron Lookout (F-16D, "The Valley") into the Jezreel Valley with Ramat David Airbase

In December 2024, the first ultra-Orthodox technician unit of the IAF was established on Ramat David, after 26 so-called Haredim had completed their training. They will be responsible for the 105 Squadron "Scorpion" with F-16D fighter jets and maintain their weapons systems. The aim of this training is to better integrate ultra-Orthodox Jews into the army. The challenge is to enable soldiers to live a religious lifestyle within the army. This includes separate accommodation, strict kosher cuisine and the construction of a synagogue on the base. The IAF called the now completed training a "groundbreaking pilot project".

=== Helicopters ===
From 1996 to 2025, the Eurocopter AS565 Panther Atalef of 193 Squadron "Defenders Of The West" at Ramat David served as maritime reconnaissance, surveillance and SAR helicopters and were used in close cooperation with the Israeli Navy as on-board helicopters on ships of the Sa'ar 5-class corvette and Sa'ar 6-class corvette. These have their home port at the Haifa naval base, 25 km away.

On 31 August 2025, the 193 Squadron at Ramat David was closed. It is expected to reopen in 2026 at Palmachim Airbase with eight SH-60F Seahawk, which had already been purchased by the IAF and Navy from US Navy stocks in 2015. The helicopters were extensively converted and equipped with Israeli systems.

Until then, the remaining Atalefs will continue to serve on the ships. The relocation of 193 Squadron "Defenders Of The West" is another indication that Ramat David is being prepared to be abandoned by the IAF and converted into a civilian airport.

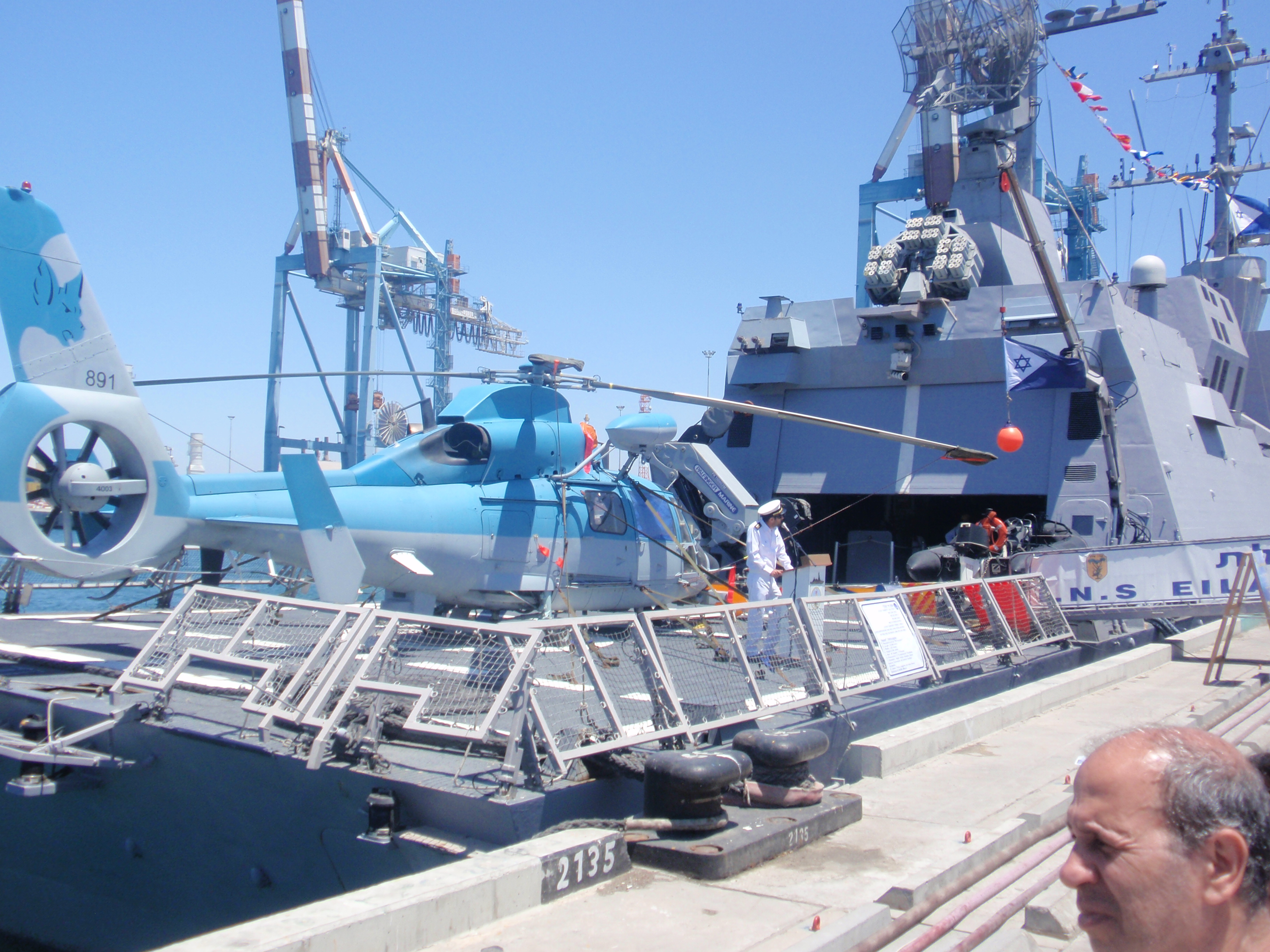
An AS565 Panther Atalef of 193 Squadron as onboard helicopter of a Sa'ar 5-class corvette in 2011

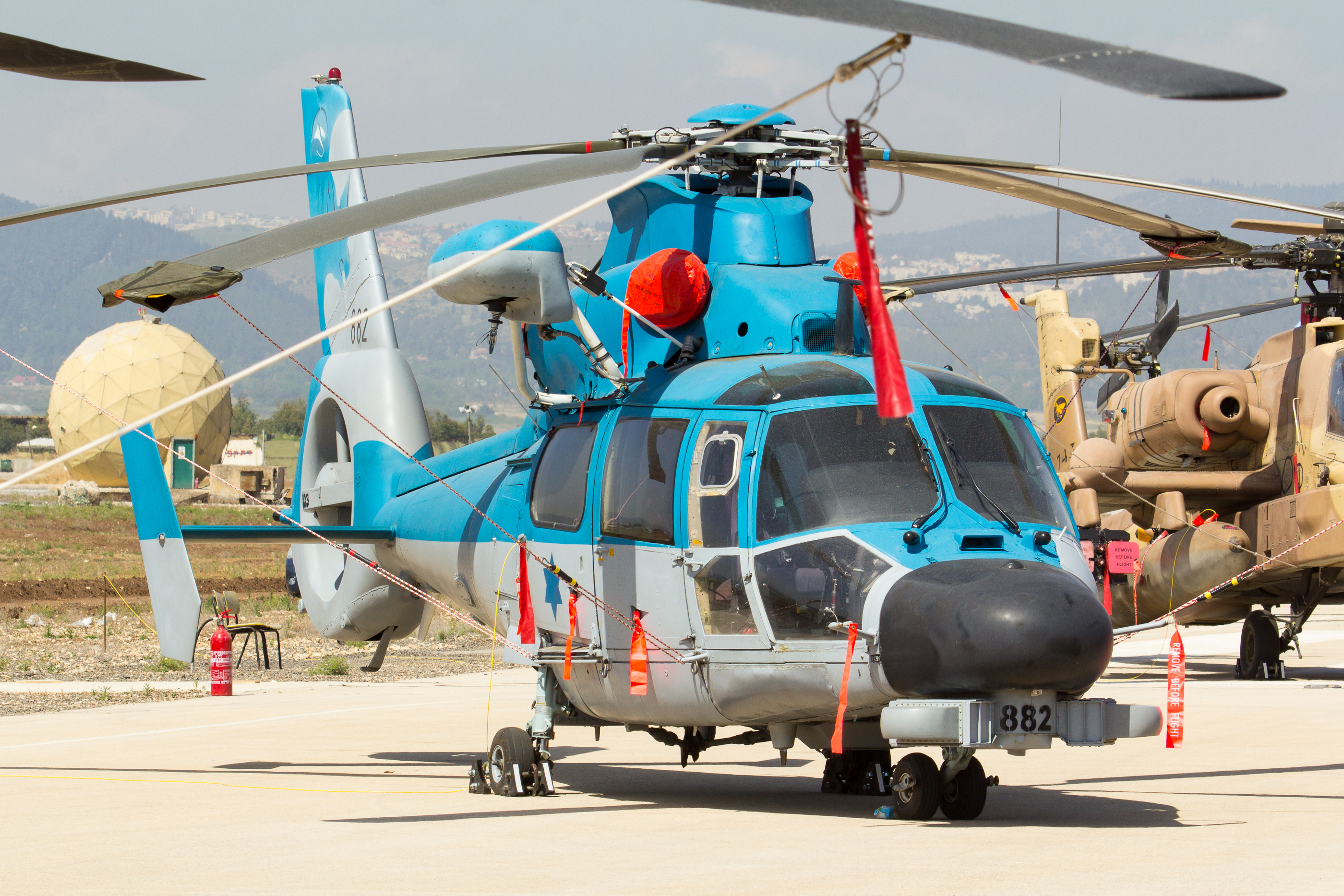
An AS565 Panther Atalef maritime helicopter of 193 Squadron "Defenders of the West" in May 2017

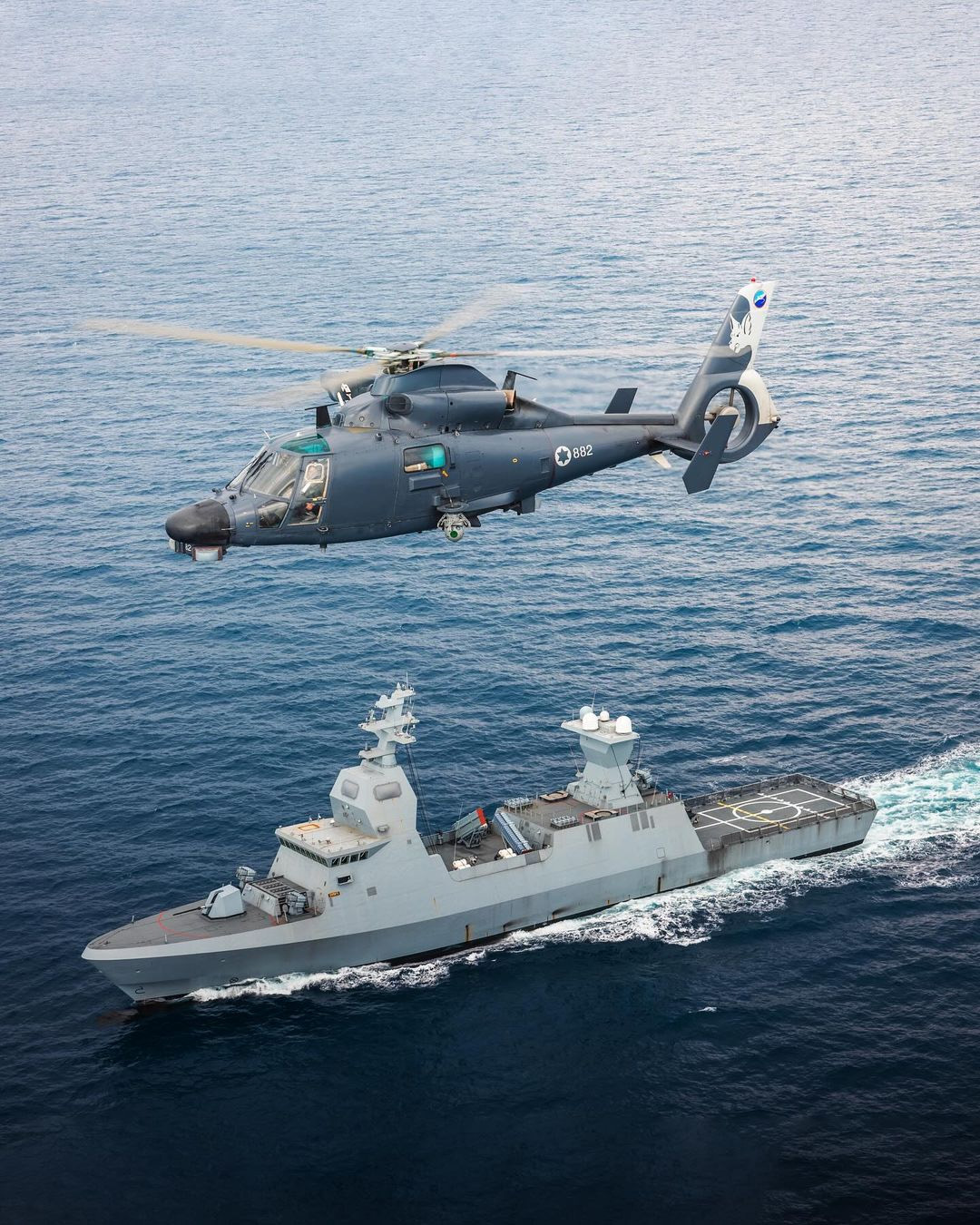
An AS565 Panther Atalef of 193 Squadron is flying above its Sa'ar 6-class corvette in 2024

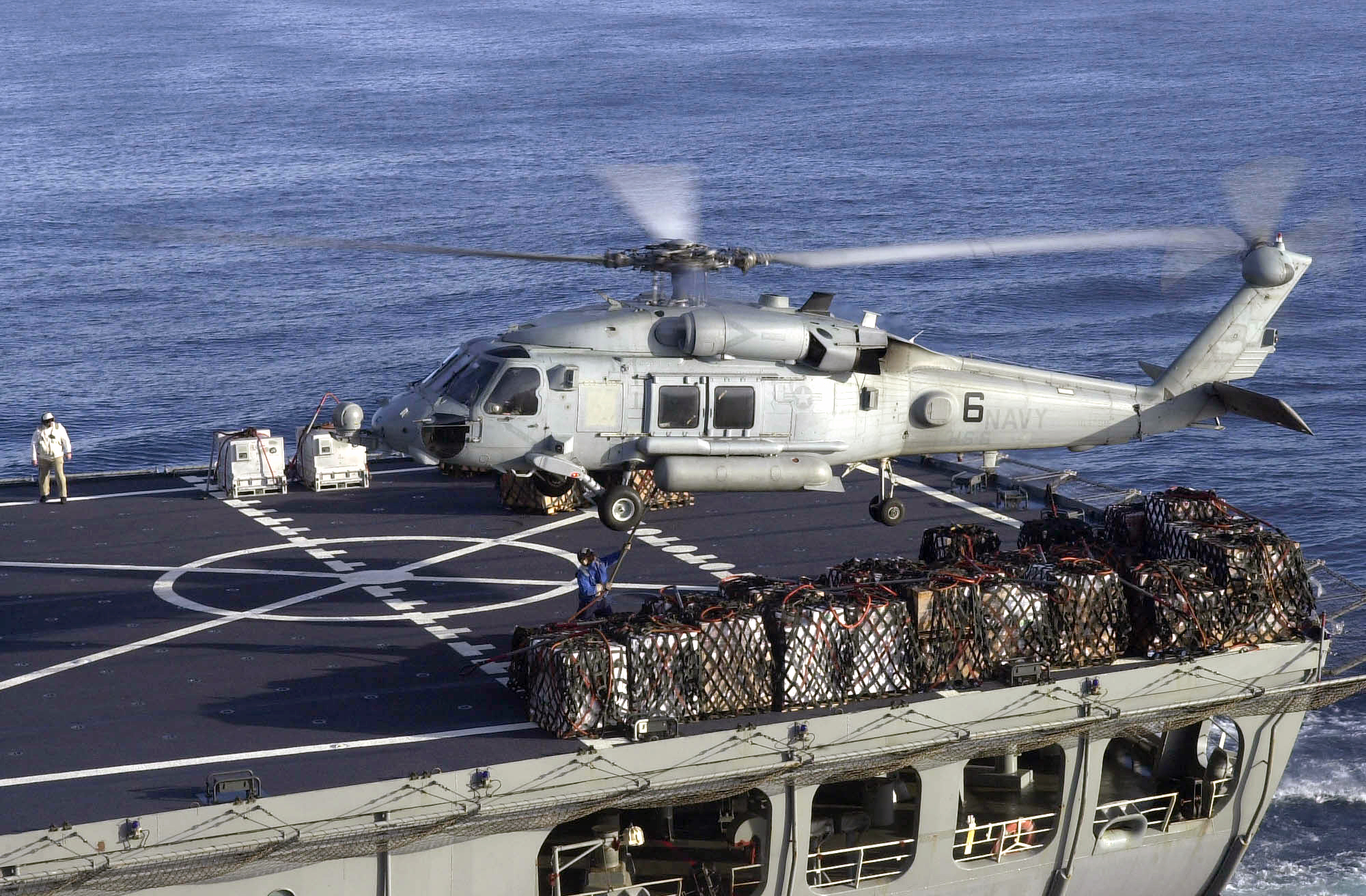
From 2026 the AS565 Atalef will be replaced by eight SH-60F Seahawk, bought used from the US Navy

=== Secret UAVs ===
There are two squadrons of still-secret UAVs at Ramat David: the 157 Squadron "In The Valley" and the 160 Squadron "Shadow Hunter" (see gallery below). It is assumed that the reason for the secrecy is their stealthiness. Since other countries have such stealth UAVs for a long time, it can also be assumed that Israel – a leading manufacturer of drones – also has such aircraft, but wants to keep their appearance secret for as long as possible. Large UAVs are also designed to fly for at least 24 hours at a time, which would make the whole of Iran accessible, for example.

=== Hezbollah attacks ===
On 22 August and 22 September 2024, the militant group Hezbollah launched many rockets from Lebanon in an attempt to hit the base, but no serious hit has been reported. An Iron Dome defense system (see photo above and 32°40′04″N 35°09′38″E) stationed there had probably intercepted most of the incoming missiles. Hezbollah had previously published a disturbing video showing the base from above by a UAV flying over for several minutes and named various buildings and installations on it. The video also showed that some Apache attack helicopters from the Ramon Airbase are temporarily stationed there to take part in military operations in Lebanon against Hezbollah.

=== 2026 Iran war ===
During the Iran war in early June 2026, Iran's Revolutionary Guards say they targeted Israel's Ramat David Airbase. The IDF confirmed that the airbase was hit by a missile strike. A hangar was damaged that is reportedly used for vehicle maintenance.

== International airport ==
Since 2014, there have been considerations to convert Ramat David into a third major international airport alongside Ben Gurion Airport near Tel Aviv and Ramon Airport near Eilat. The Nevatim Airbase in the south of Israel was also being discussed, which could be used for both military and civilian purposes, as was previously the case with the Ovda Airbase for over 30 years.

In the meantime, the civilian conversion of Ramat David seemed to be off the table, because the local resistance to it is too strong. In 2021, the government's policy was to build two smaller international airports at both Haifa in the north and Beersheba in the south. However, after the presentation of an extensive study and audit in 2023, Ramat David is again the top priority for a major airport.

In July 2025, Israel's National Planning and Construction Council approved a review of plans for two international airports at Ramat David and Ziklag (15 kilometers northwest of Beersheba), including environmental adjustments, a review of security aspects, and addressing existing construction constraints. In February 2026, the Israeli government had finally approved the construction of the two international airports at the locations mentioned above.

== Units ==
- 101 Squadron "First Fighter" – operating F-16C Barak
- 105 Squadron "Scorpion" – operating F-16D Barak
- 109 Squadron "The Valley" – operating F-16D Barak
- 157 Squadron "In The Valley" – operating classified UAVs for Electronic Warfare (EW)
- 160 Squadron "Shadow Hunter" – operating classified UAVs, reopened in 2018
- 193 Squadron "Defenders of the West" – operating Eurocopter AS565 Panther Atalef – has been closed on 31 August 2025
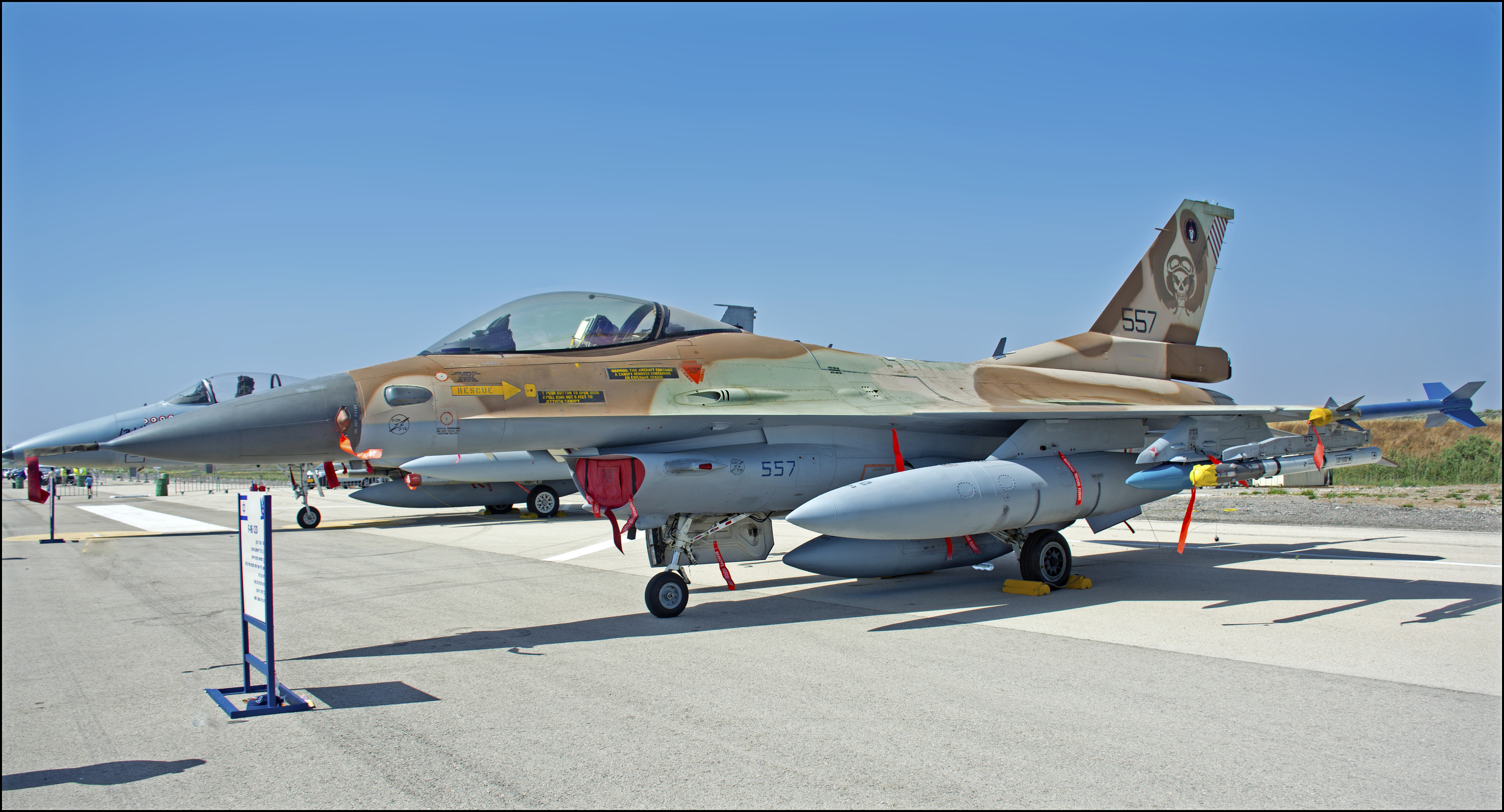
An F-16C Barak of 101 Squadron "First Fighter" from Ramat David Airbase, exhibited in May 2017

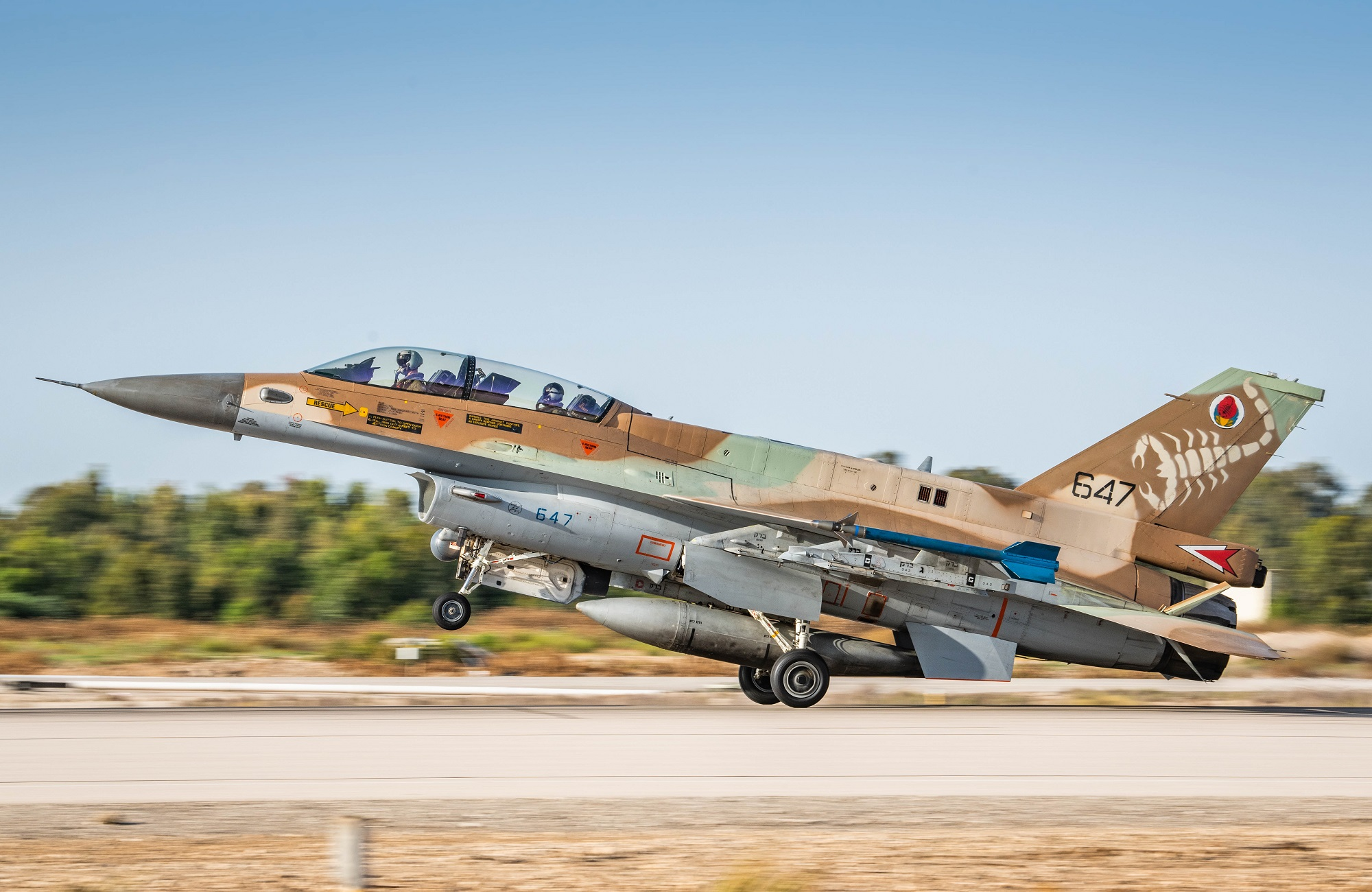
Starting F-16D Barak of 105 Squadron "Scorpion" from Ramat David Airbase in May 2021

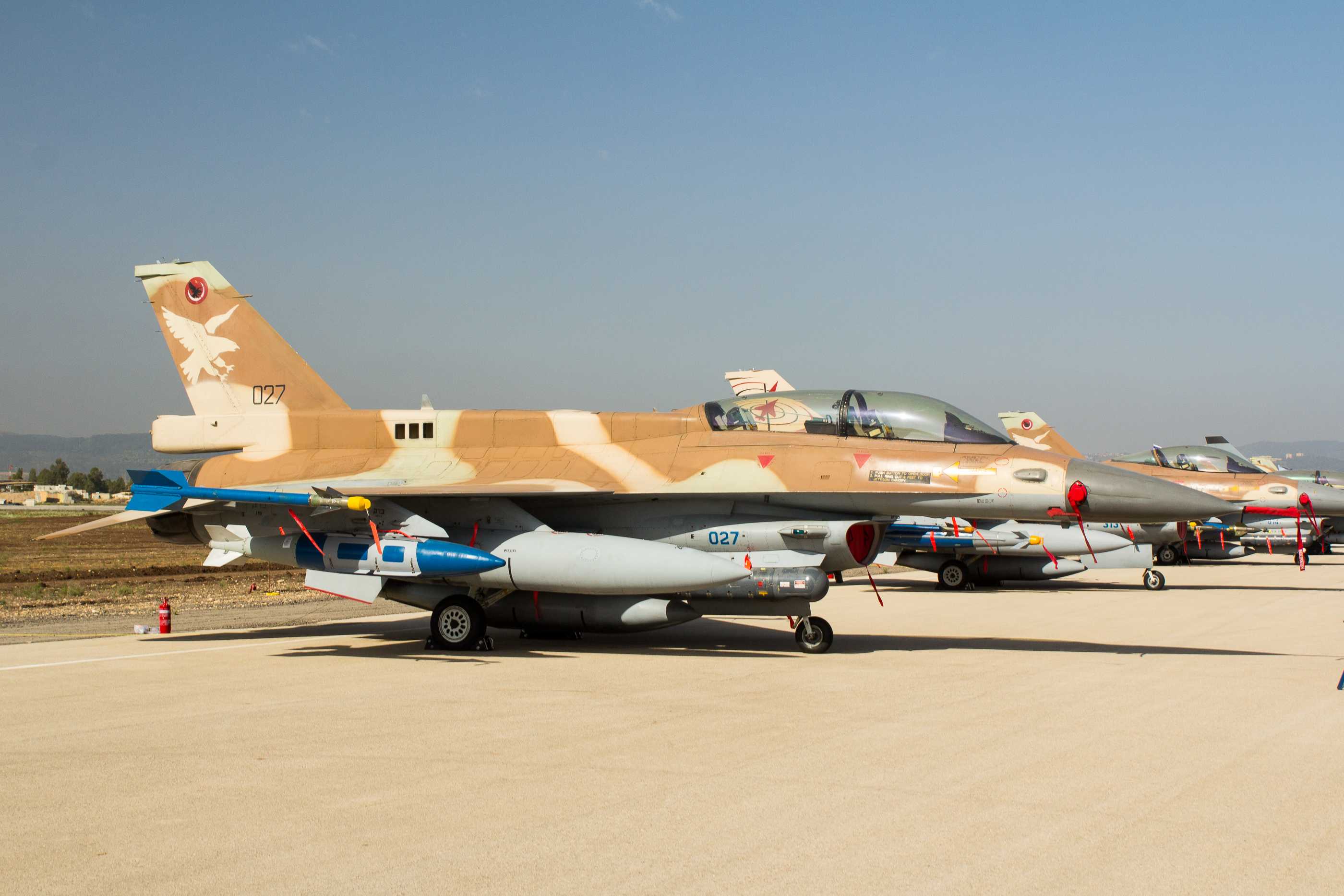
An F-16D Barak two-seater of 109 Squadron "The Valley" at Ramat David Airbase in May 2017

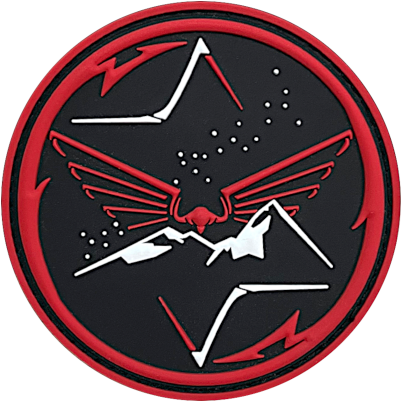
Badge of 157 Squadron "In The Valley" with classified UAVs for Electronic Warfare

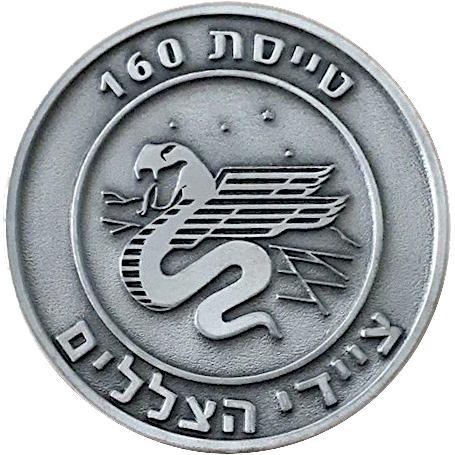
Medal of recognition for the reopening of 160 Squadron as "Shadow Hunter" with classified UAVs in 2018

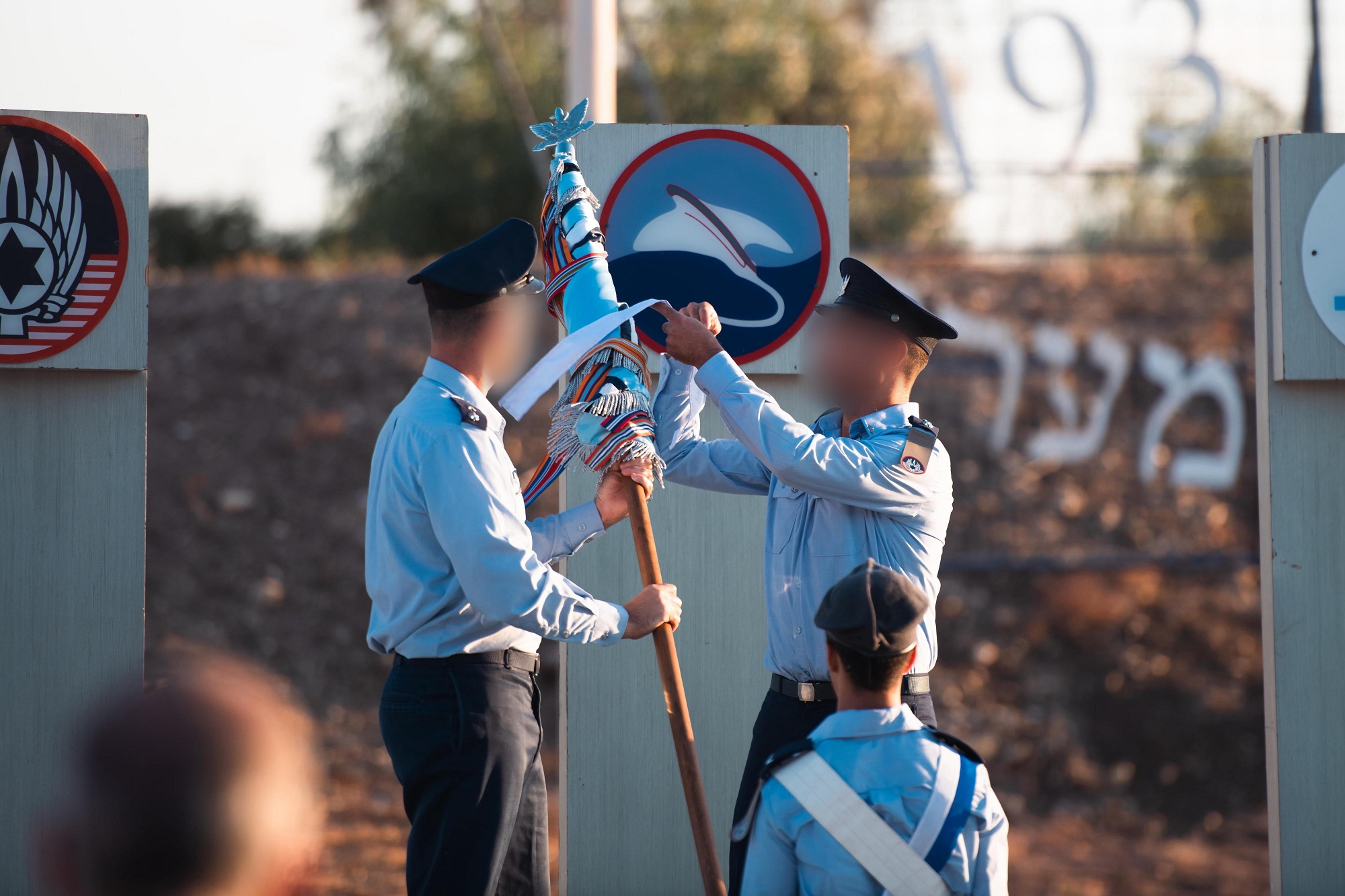
Closing ceremony of 193 Squadron "Defenders Of The West" at Ramat David on 31 August 2025

Note: IAF aircraft can usually be assigned to their squadron by the symbols on the tail

== Accidents ==
- On 16 September 1996, an MH-65 Dolphin helicopter from the 193 Squadron "Defenders of the West" from Ramat David crashed about 12 miles off the coast of Nahariya, killing all three crew members.
- On 27 March 2000, an F-16D Barak of 109 Squadron "The Valley" from Ramat David crashed into the sea 20 kilometers off the coast of Atlit during a night exercise. The pilot Jonathan Begin – a grandson of former Prime Minister Menachem Begin – and his navigator Lior Harari were killed in the crash.
- On 3 January 2022, an AS 565 Panther Atalef of 193 Squadron "Defenders of the West" from Ramat David crashed off the coast of Haifa, killing two crew members and seriously injuring another. (See: 2022 Israeli Air Force AS565 Panther helicopter crash)
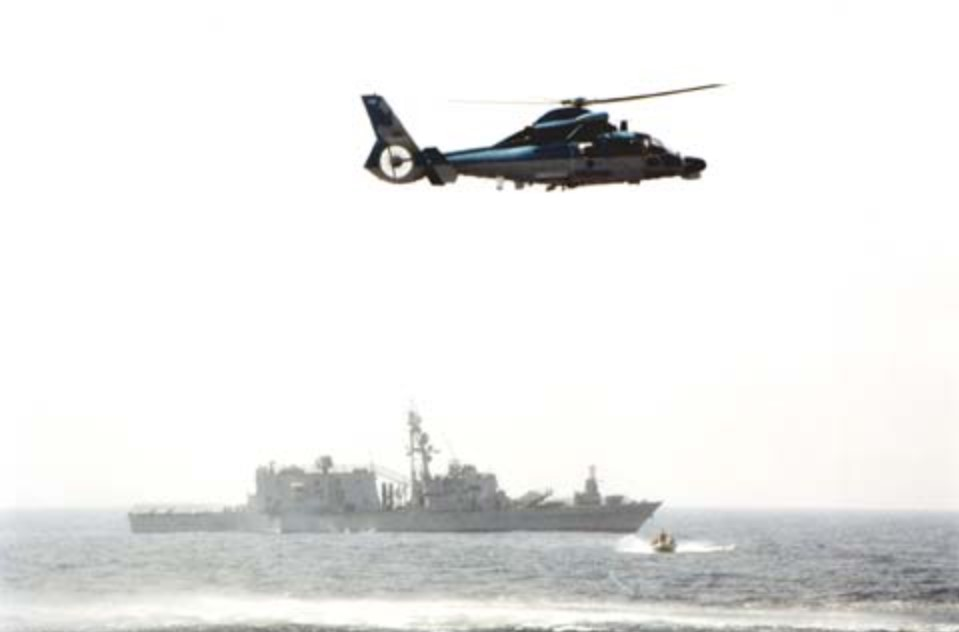
A Sa'ar 5-class corvette with AS 565 Panther Atalef looking for the crashed F-16D Barak in March 2000

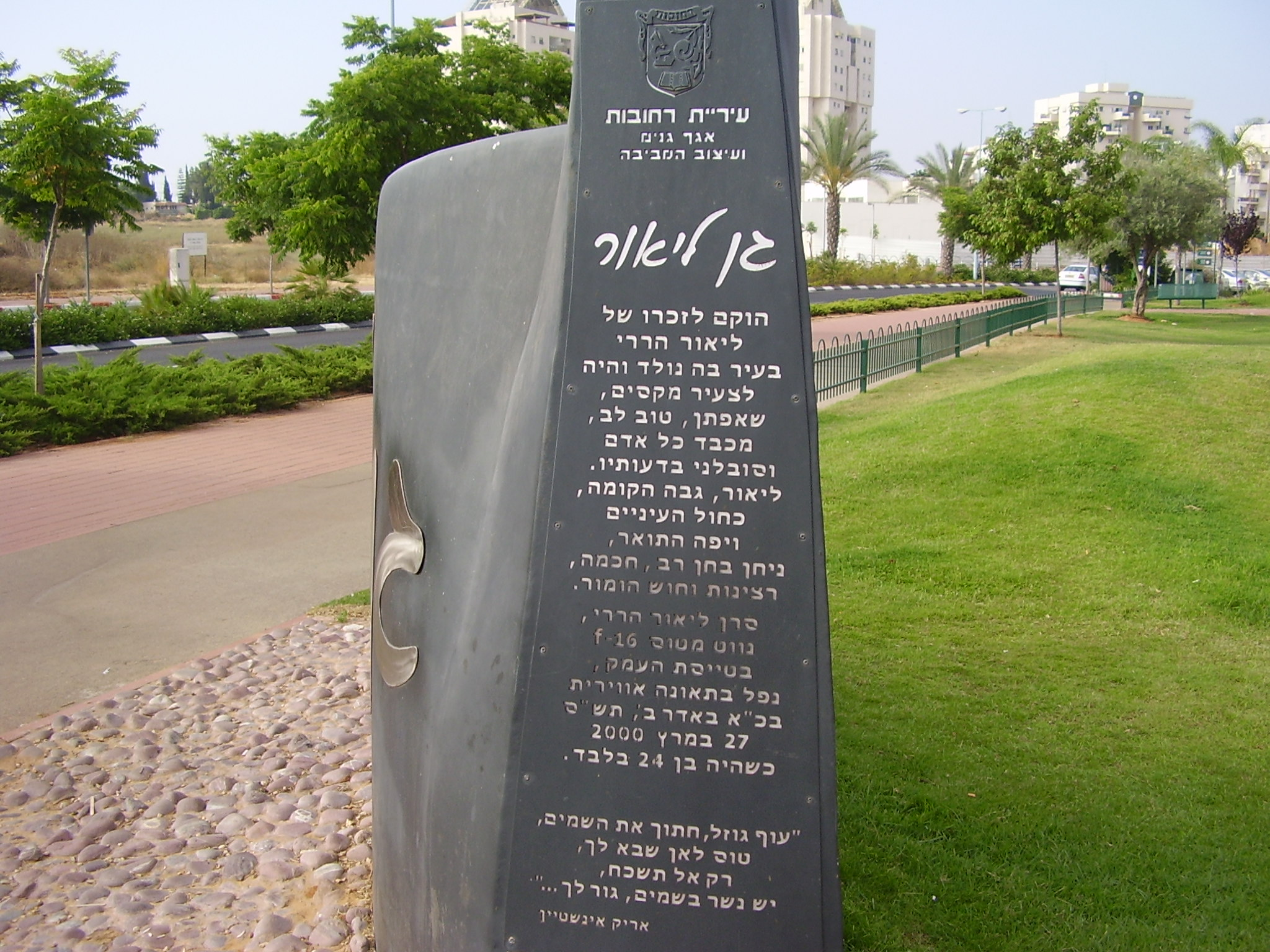
A memorial stone in Lior Harari Garden in Rehovot – the navigator who died in the crash on 27 March 2000, with pilot Jonathan Begin

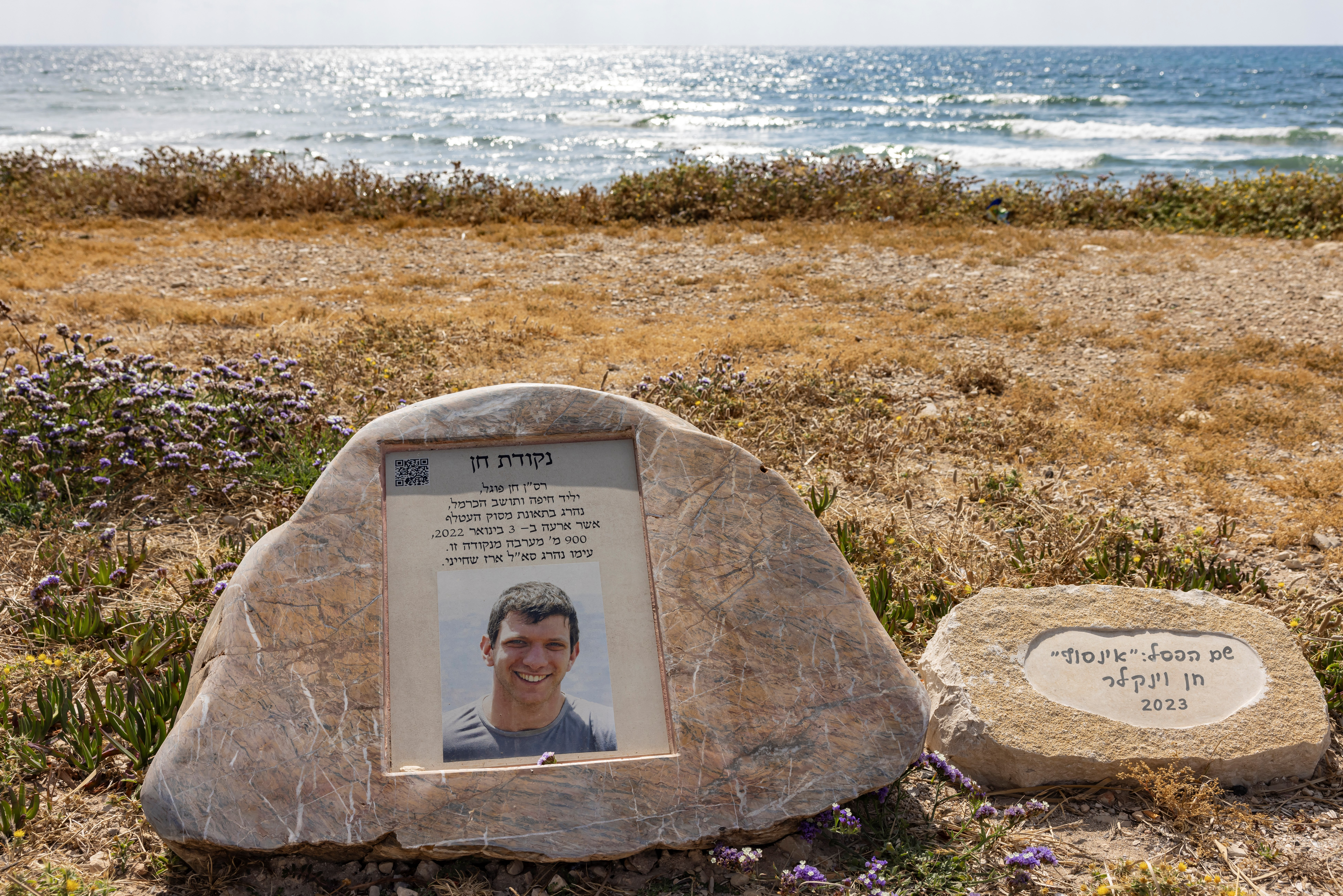
A memorial stone at Shikmona Beach (Haifa), for Maj. Chen Fogel, one of the victims of the helicopter crash on 3 January 2022

== See also ==
- List of former Royal Air Force stations
- List of airports in Israel
