= Yaakov Israel Ifargan =

Israeli Kabbalist rabbi and spiritual adviser

Yaakov Israel Ifargan יעקב ישראל איפרגן "The X-ray"
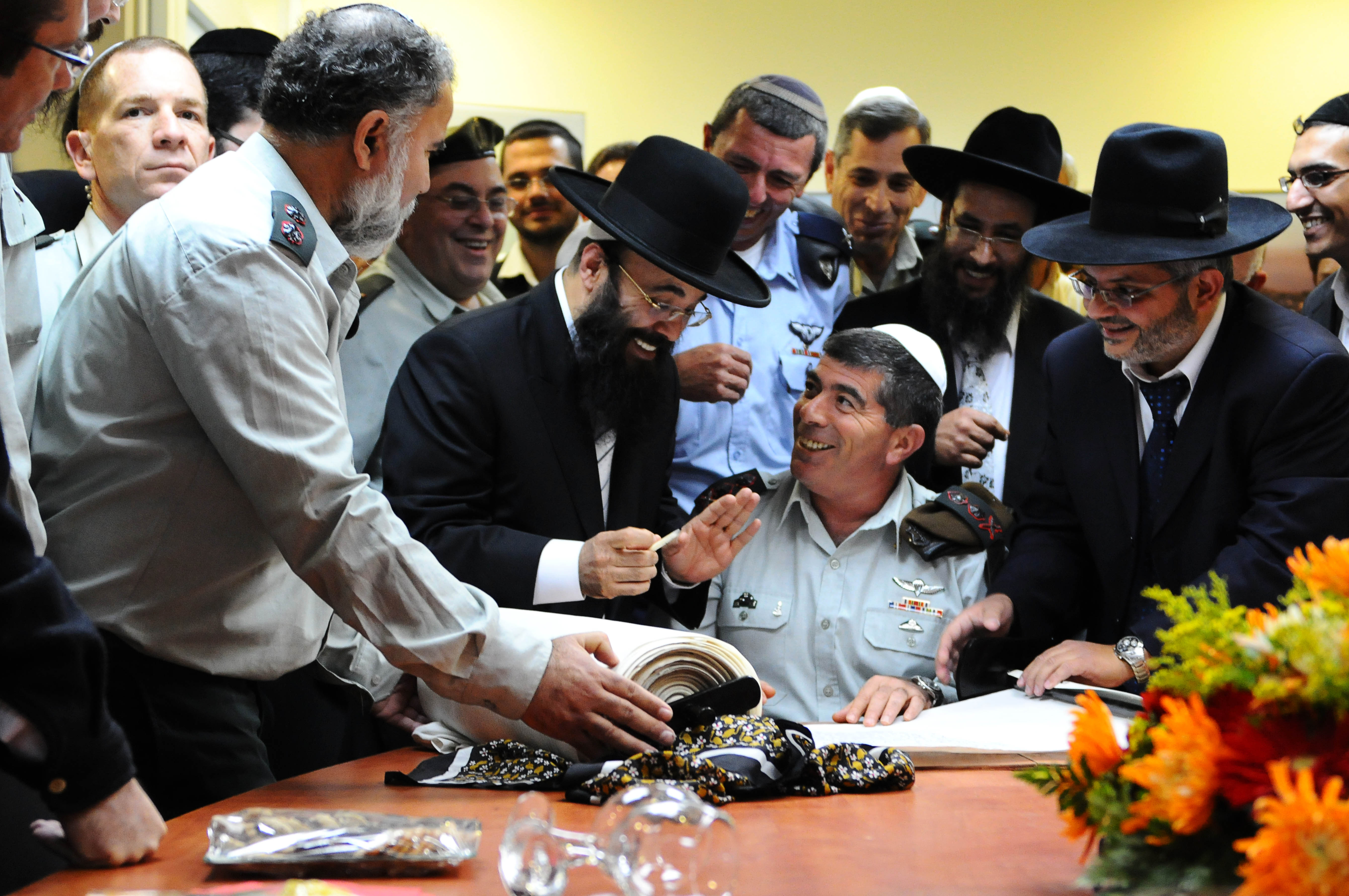
- A Torah scroll dedication ceremony in the presence of Ifargan and senior IDF officers

Personal life
- Parent: Shalom Ifargan

Religious life
- Religion: Judaism
- Denomination: Haredi
- Residence: Netivot
- Website: rentgen.co.il

Yaakov Israel Ifargan (Hebrew: יעקב ישראל איפרגן; born 1966), also known as the "X-ray" (Hebrew: ha-Rentgen), is an Israeli Kabbalist rabbi and spiritual adviser who operates in Netivot, a town in southern Israel. He is known among his followers for his supposed healing and prognostic powers.

== Biography ==
Yaakov Israel Ifargan was born in Netivot, a town in southern Israel, the ninth and youngest child of Shalom and Esther Ifargan. In his childhood, he was no different than other children of his age, and did not exhibit unusual personality traits. Like most other residents of the town, the Ifargan family was a lower-class family who originally came from Tiznit, Morocco.

Ifargan did not undergo formal rabbinic ordination. He studied in a religious Yeshiva, but dropped out at the age of 17. He spent a year studying mysticism in seclusion, in the forests of northern Israel. Then, at the age of 18 he was enlisted to the Israeli army, and served for three years as required by law. When his father died in 1995, Ifargan began spreading legends on the mystical powers of his father, which he claimed had healing powers and predicted the future. He started performing spiritual activities out of his parents’ house, as well as the gravesite estate that he purchased for his father, outside of the Netivot cemetery. Ifargan started claiming that he possessed prophetic powers, by which he can see the future as well as diagnose the health problems of people. A diverse community of miracle-seeking admirers began to form around the young mystic, then 30 years old. His followers were impressed with his supposed abilities, dubbing him "The X-ray".

== Rabbinic career ==
Ifargan's admirers includes a mix of low income Mizrahi Jewish people from southern Israel, as well as high profile Israeli politicians, businessmen and celebrities. Ifargan also has a following among a group of Breslov Hasidim.

Ifargan conducts an annual event at his fathers tomb in Netivot and holds midnight Tikkun (reparation) ceremonies there.

Ifargan provides blessings and business advice to Israeli businessmen and politicians, and adherents believe he has the ability to diagnose patients by eyesight. Others claim he is a charlatan who has become a multimillionaire from selling amulets and illicit business affairs.

Ifargan is one of the wealthiest rabbis in Israel, with an estimated net worth of $23 million as of 2012. One of his followers is Nochi Dankner, who has donated hundreds of thousands of Israeli shekels to the Rabbi's causes.

According to a 2001 report in Yedioth Ahronoth, most of the sums donated are not declared to the Israeli tax authorities, In 2008, Ifergan's "Netivot Shalom" list won four seats in the Netivot city council elections. In 2010, Netivot's city comptroller, Shimon Alon, a confidant of a rival Netivot kabbalist, Baba Baruch, was arrested for allegedly paying a young woman to seduce Ifargan and photograph him in intimate positions, with the aim of tarnishing his image. In 2013, Israeli crime boss Shalom Domrani was arrested for threatening Ifargan to support Mayor Yehiel Zohar in the Netivot municipal elections. Abergel’s supporters lobbied for the reelection of Mayor Yehiel Zohar, while Ifergan supported the challenger, Eyal Mesika.

Ifergan's aides publish "Inyan Ba'ir", a Netivot local newspaper, to convey the rabbi's messages and strengthen his public profile.

=== Tikkun ceremonies ===
Ifargan erected a large, truncated pyramid shaped mausoleum for his father at the top of a hill covered in white marble. In this location he performs ceremonies, and most importantly, the Tikkun (reparation). The ceremonies are always opened by David Zarfati, Ifargan's master of ceremonies, who instructs the participants, who sing and clap their hands, while loud music is played. Ifargan throws thousands of candles into a bonfire, creating massive flames. Sometimes Ifargan places his hands in the fire but is not burned. Ifargan says that this is a Kabbalistic ceremony. In reality the ceremony is unique in form, and differs significantly from the traditional Kabbalistic Tikkun, which does not include a bonfire. The ceremony is preceded by prayer services and a collection of donations.

== Controversy ==
The use of religion to gain profit, by Ifargan and other rabbis, drew criticism by other Jewish clerics, such as Rabbi Donniel Hartman, president of the Shalom Hartman Institute, who said "It's disappointing when religion descends to this... It's not some channel of divine power for personal wealth accumulation. That's small religion." Ifargan wears modern Haredi dress. By doing so, Dr. Anat Feldman of the Achva Academic College, says he creates an image that he is part of the rabbinic establishment, thus gaining additional public legitimacy. However, some Haredi leaders including Rabbi Ovadia Yosef and Rabbi Chaim Kanievsky have denounced Ifergan’s magical practices. The rabbis accused Ifergan of paganism and called him a "fiend", further threatening that anyone associated with Ifergan would have no part in the next world. In 2009, a reconciliation meeting took place between Ifargan and some prominent Ashkenazi rabbis, including Aharon Leib Shteinman, Chaim Kanievsky, Nissim Karelitz and Michel Yehuda Lefkowitz.

== See also ==
- Baba Sali
