= Katsav =

Katsav is a Hebrew surname literally meaning Butcher. Notable people with the surname include:

- Gila Katsav, Israeli public figure who was First Lady of Israel from 2000 until 2007
- Guy Katsav, British record producer
- Moshe Katsav, Israeli politician, the eighth President of Israel
