= Erfoud =

Arfoud أرفود (Arabic) ⴰⵔⴼⵓⴷ (Berber languages)
- City
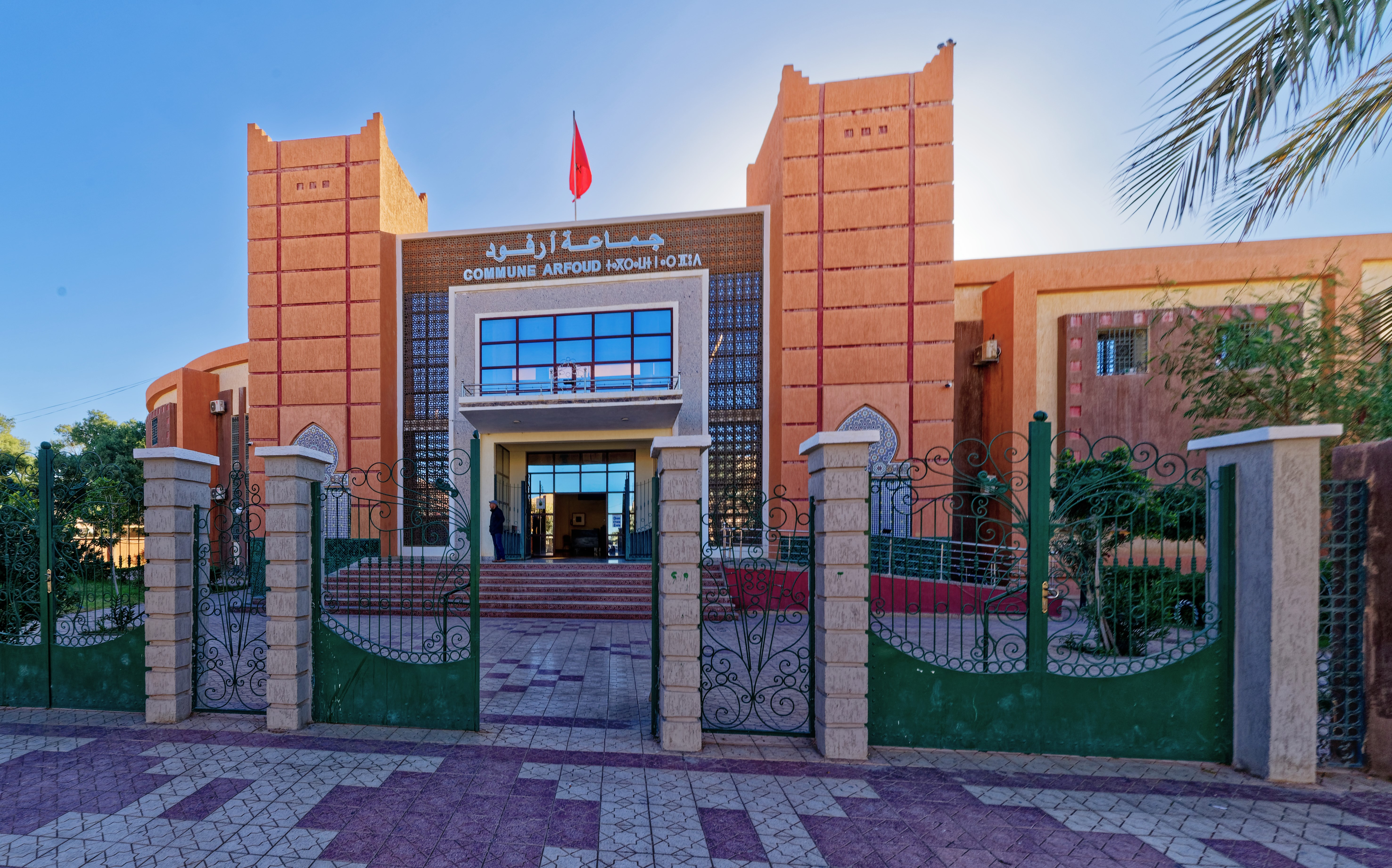
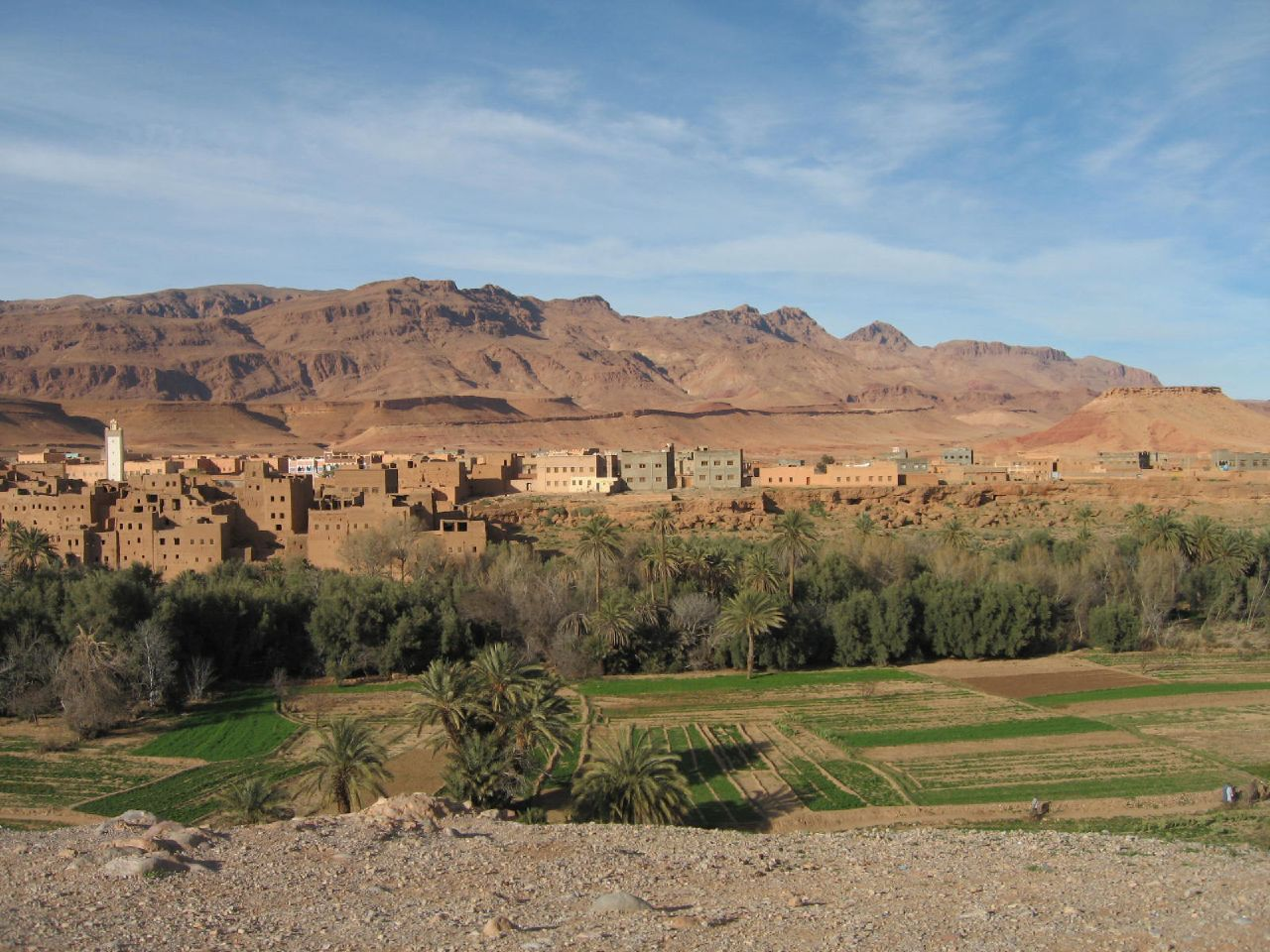
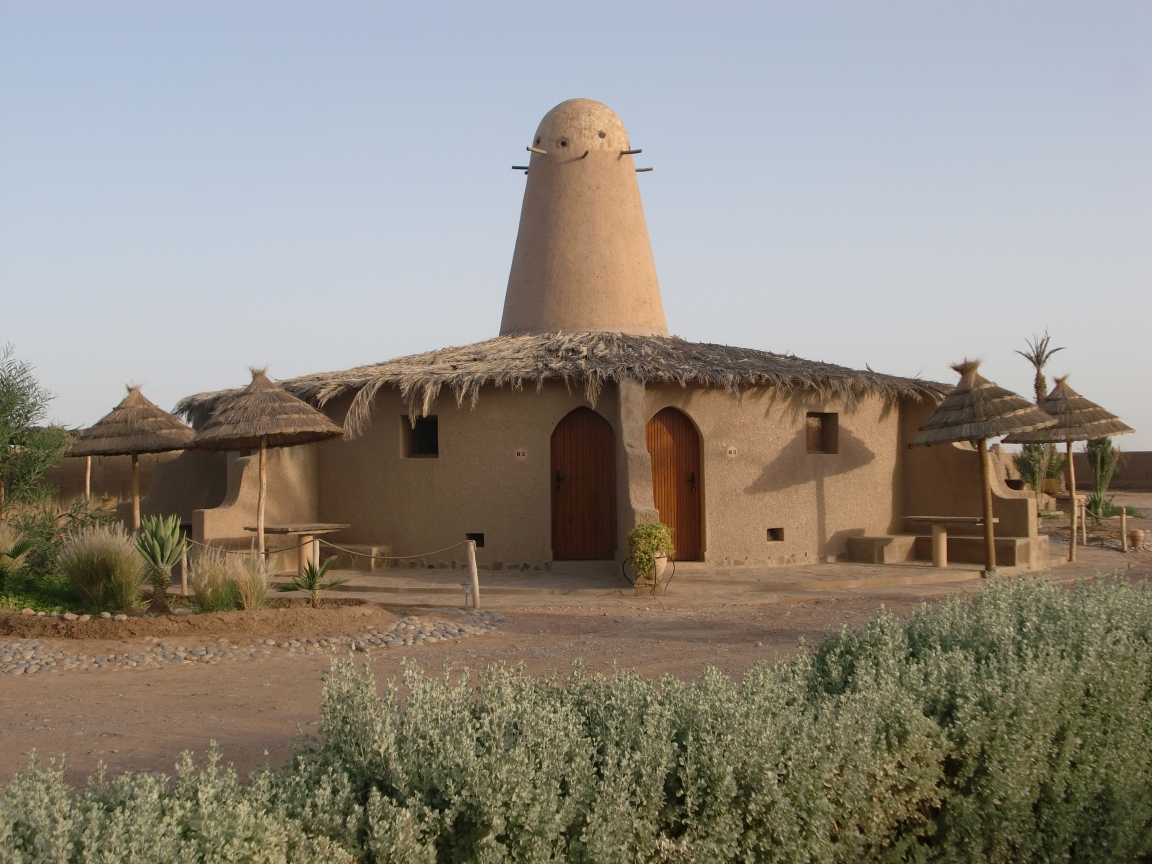
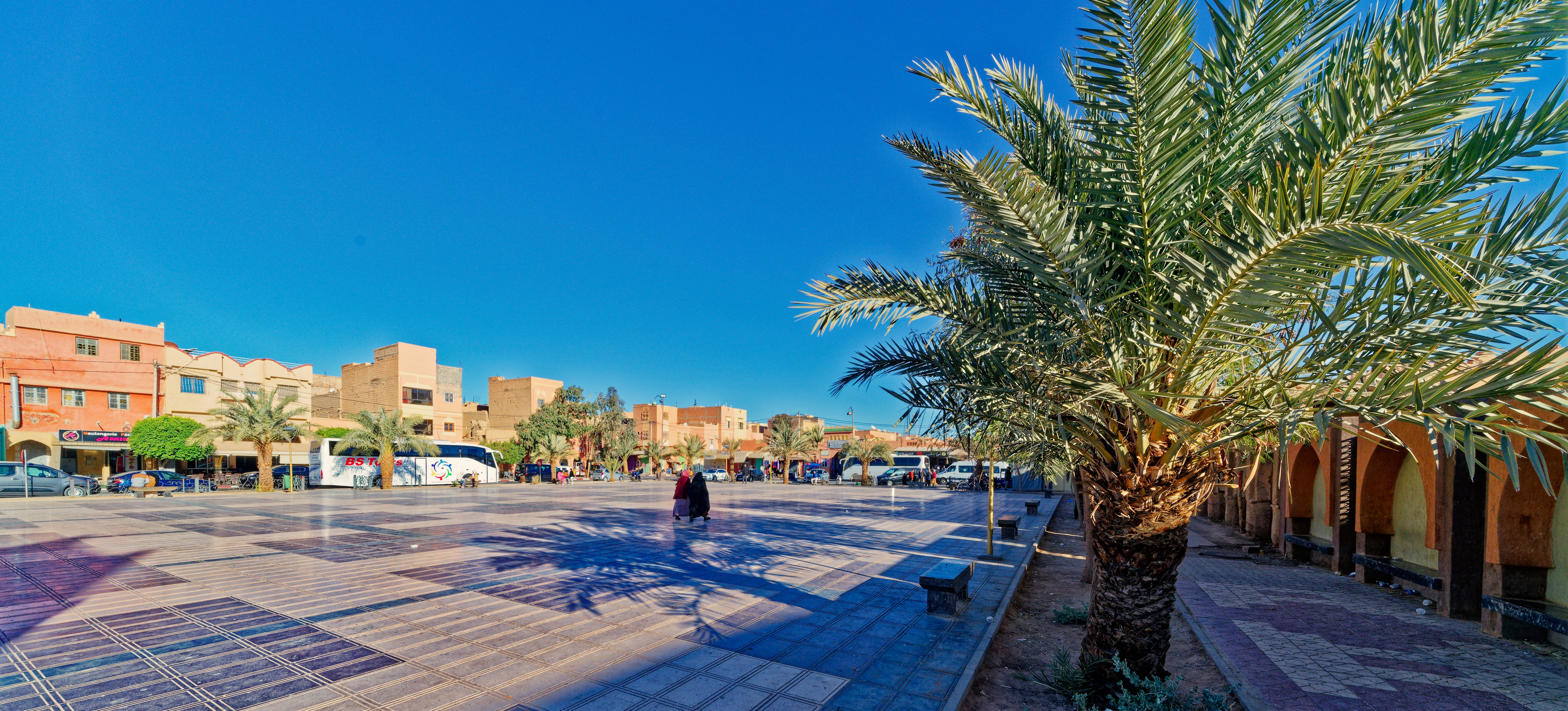
- Interactive map of Arfoud
- Coordinates: 31°26′10″N 4°13′58″W
- Country: Morocco
- Region: Drâa-Tafilalet
- Province: Errachidia
- Elevation: 807 m (2,648 ft)

Population (2024)
  - Total: 28,912
  - Density: 3,139/km^{2} (8,130/sq mi)
- Time zone: UTC+0 (GMT)
- Postcode: 52200

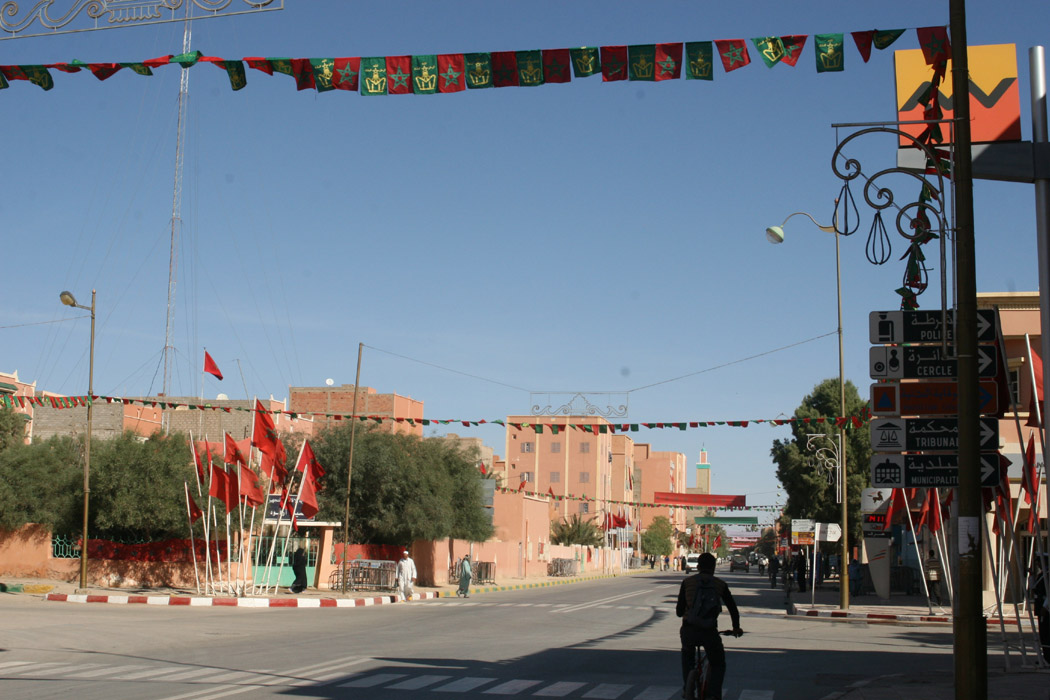
Erfoud, city center district

Erfoud or Arfoud (Berber languages: ⴰⵔⴼⵓⴷ, Arfud; Arabic: أرفود) is an oasis town in Errachidia Province, Drâa-Tafilalet region, Morocco. It belongs to ait atta tribe, divided into several districts: Hay Salam, Hay Jdid, Hay Ziz, Hay el Bathaa, Hay Annahda, and Hay el Hamri.

Due to its proximity to Merzouga desert village in the Erg Chebbi Dunes, Erfoud has developed tourist-related infrastructures such as hotels and restaurants.

== History ==
=== Jewish community ===
Erfoud's Jewish community traced its roots to the French protectorate period in the early 20th century, when several hundred individuals from nearby towns, particularly El Mâadid, settled in the region encouraged by French plans to develop the town. The community gained prominence as a base of the Abuhatzeira family, known for its esteemed rabbis, including Abir Yakkov, the Baba Lu Ḥazzan, and the Baba Sali. Due to the absence of an Alliance Israélite Universelle school in Erfoud, although one existed in nearby Rissani, many Jewish children attended a French school.

By 1931, the Jewish population constituted approximately one-third of Erfoud's total residents, numbering 1,172 out of a total population of 3,534. Following World War II, the number of Jewish inhabitants exceeded 700. Following Morocco's independence in 1956, the majority of Erfoud's Jewish population emigrated, mainly to Israel.

== Filming location ==
Due to the beauty of the surrounding Sahara Desert and the town's oasis areas, Erfoud has been a filming location for many films, including:

- March or Die (1977)

In the film archeologists are uncovering an ancient city near Erfoud buried by a sand storm 3,000 years ago. The site is the resting place of a Berber saint, "The Angel of the Desert".

- The Mummy (1999)

Filming began in Marrakesh, Morocco on May 4, 1998 and lasted 17 weeks. Photography then moved to the Sahara Desert outside Erfoud.

Production designer Allan Cameron found a dormant volcano near Erfoud where the entire set for Hamunaptra could be constructed.

- The Four Feathers (2002)

For its Egypt and Sudan scenes, the film directed by Shekhar Kapur starring Heath Ledger, Wes Bentley and Kate Hudson was shot in Erfoud and Ouarzazate for more than a week.

- Prince of Persia (2010)

Mike Newell selected Morocco as a shooting location for the film and also planned to film in Pinewood Studios. Filming began in July 2008 in Morocco. Eight weeks were spent in Morocco before the first unit moved to Pinewood.

- Spectre (2015)

For the 24th (official) James Bond film, the nearby Gara Medouar played the part of an enemy headquarters.

== Mars analogue research ==
This area of Morocco has also been identified as being very similar in appearance and possibly geology to certain areas on the planet Mars. Because of this, there is an interest in this area as a field research location for Mars analogue research.

In February 2013 the Austrian Space Forum spent the whole month with a field team including two space suit simulators (Aouda.X and Aouda.S) and a number of rovers to conduct a large number of experiments. They were supported by a Mission Support Center run from Innsbruck, Austria to simulate a mission to the surface of Mars. The main desert base camp was named Camp Weyprecht on February 11, with a later satellite camp about 80 km further south being called Station Payer.
