= Elazar Abuhatzeira =

Israeli Orthodox Sefardi rabbi and kabbalist (1948–2011)

Rabbi Elazar Abuhatzeira אלעזר אבוחצירא
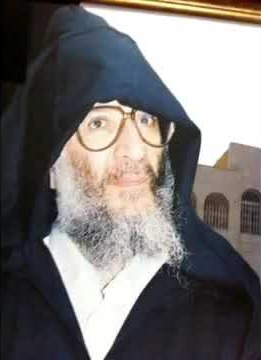
- Title: Baba Elazar

Personal life
- Born: 9 August 1948 Rissani, Morocco
- Died: 28 July 2011 (aged 62) Be'er Sheva, Israel
- Buried: Mount of Olives
- Parent(s): Meir and Simcha Abuhatzeira

Religious life
- Religion: Judaism
- Residence: Be'er Sheva, Israel

Elazar Abuhatzeira (Hebrew: אלעזר אבוחצירא) also known as Baba Elazar (9 August 1948 – 28 July 2011) was an Orthodox Sefardi rabbi and kabbalist in Israel.

Born in Rissani, Morocco to Rabbi Meir and Simcha Abuhatzeira, Elazar was the grandson of the Baba Sali, Rabbi Yisrael Abuhatzeira, and the brother of Rabbi David Chai Abuhatzeira of Nahariya.

He moved to Israel in 1966 and studied at the Porat Yosef Yeshiva. He later moved to Beersheba where he ran a yeshiva. He practiced a lifestyle characterized by ascetic habits, abstaining from meat and poultry for over three decades due to concerns about dietary laws, limiting his sleep, wearing a cloak that covered his face and prevented him from looking at women, and constructing a tunnel between his home and synagogue to avoid walking in public. Supporters and visitors attributed various reported miracles, blessings, and revelations to him, which contributed to his public reputation. In 2011 he had estimated assets of $80 million.

Abuhatzeira was married to Dvora and had seven children.

== Fraud and tax evasion claims ==
A 1997 investigation by Yossi Bar-Moha for the Haaretz newspaper linked several incidents of corruption to Abuhatzeira, claiming that he tried to impress and persuade people to pay him in exchange for his blessings; some who didn't comply reported being threatened with curses. The report also claimed that Abuhatzeira's bank account contained NIS 250 million in gifts and contributions, that he had sold land designated for a girls school, and was evading municipal property taxes. A police investigation was launched, and in 2003, Abuhatzeira was ordered to pay NIS 100 million to the tax authority for money he had received from followers. Following an appeal, a settlement was reached whereby he paid back NIS 20 million to charitable organizations. By 2004, Bar-Moha claimed that Abuhatzeira's income had grown to NIS 500 million ($141 million at that time). Bar-Moha filed a joint petition with the Progressive Judaism Movement to the Israeli Supreme Court demanding the tax settlement to be cancelled, but the petition was dismissed.

In 2009, a man was indicted for threatening to kill Abuhatzeira, claiming that the rabbi made him a medical promise that had not come true. In 2010, Abuhatzeira was accused by Jews in New York of charging hundreds of thousands of dollars in exchange for promised miracles that never came to fruition. The prosecutor in Brooklyn subsequently opened an investigation, and Abuhatzeira stopped traveling to the United States as a result. His followers and students claimed that the plaintiff was a violent man who tried to obtain halachic approval for certain prohibitions from the rabbi, and the rabbi spoke harshly to him and expelled him. In light of this, he held a grudge and made false allegations against the rabbi. His students also claimed that Abuhatzeira was humble and modest and would never do such a thing, insisting he used his wealth to support the poor.

== Murder ==
Abuhatzeira was murdered on 28 July 2011 by Asher Dahan of El'ad who stabbed him in the upper body during a private audience. The 42-year-old attacker was said to have been unhappy with marital advice the rabbi had given him. Attempts were made at the scene to resuscitate him, but he was pronounced dead on arrival at the Soroka Medical Center. The funeral was held the next day in Jerusalem and was attended by tens of thousands of people, including Israel's chief rabbis, Haredi ministers, and Knesset members. Eulogies were delivered at the Porat Yosef Yeshiva and in the Geula neighborhood. MK Meshulam Nahari asked "who would have thought that... a rabbi could be murdered in Israel?" He is buried on the Mount of Olives. Asher Dahan was sentenced to life imprisonment for the murder.
