= Abuhatzeira =

Abuhatzeira (Hebrew pronunciation) or Abu Hasira (Arabic) is the surname of a family of rabbis. Notable members of the family include, chronologically:

- R. Shmuel, the patriarch of the family
  - Yaakov Abuhatzeira (1806–1880), Moroccan rabbi, son of R. Mas’ud
    - Yisrael Abuhatzeira (1889–1984), Moroccan-born Israeli rabbi known as the "Baba Sali", son of Rabbi Mas'ud Abuhatzeira son of Rabbi Yaakov
      - Meir Abuhatzeira (1917–1983), also known as the "Baba Meir", 1st born son of Baba Sali
        - David Hai Abuhatzeira (born 1952) also known as Rabbi David, former chief Rabbi of Nahariya
        - Elazar Abuhatzeira (1948–2011; murdered), the "Baba Elazar", Moroccan-born Israeli rabbi, grandson of Rabbi Meir Abuhatzeira and son of the Baba Sali
      - Baruch Abuhatzeira (born 1941), also known as the "Baba Baruch", son and successor of Baba Sali
    - Isaac Abuhatzeira (1895–1970), the "Baba Chaki", son of Rabbi Mas'ud Abuhatzeira son of Rabbi Yaakov
      - Abraham Abuhatzeira (1915–1973), the "Baba Hana", son of the "Baba Chaki"
