= Ezer Weizman =

President of Israel from 1993 to 2000

- עֵזֶר וַיְצְמָן
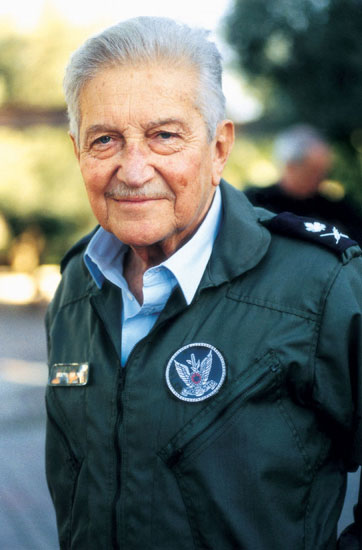

7th President of Israel
- In office 13 May 1993 – 13 July 2000
- Prime Minister: Yitzhak Rabin; Shimon Peres; Benjamin Netanyahu; Ehud Barak
- Preceded by: Chaim Herzog
- Succeeded by: Moshe Katsav

Minister of Science and Technology
- In office 22 December 1988 – 15 March 1990
- Prime Minister: Yitzhak Shamir
- Preceded by: Gideon Patt
- Succeeded by: Yuval Ne'eman

Minister of Defense
- In office 20 June 1977 – 28 May 1980
- Prime Minister: Menachem Begin
- Preceded by: Shimon Peres
- Succeeded by: Menachem Begin

Minister of Transport
- In office 15 December 1969 – 6 August 1970
- Prime Minister: Golda Meir
- Preceded by: Moshe Carmel
- Succeeded by: Shimon Peres

Member of the Knesset
- In office 13 August 1984 – 3 February 1992
- In office 13 June 1977 – 20 July 1981

Personal details
- Born: 15 June 1924 Tel Aviv, Mandatory Palestine
- Died: 24 April 2005 (aged 80) Caesarea, Israel
- Party: Labor (1991–2005)
- Other political affiliations: Gahal (1965–1972); Likud (1976–1984); Yahad (1984–1991)
- Spouse: Reuma Schwartz (m. 1950)
- Children: 2
- Relatives: Chaim Weizmann (uncle)
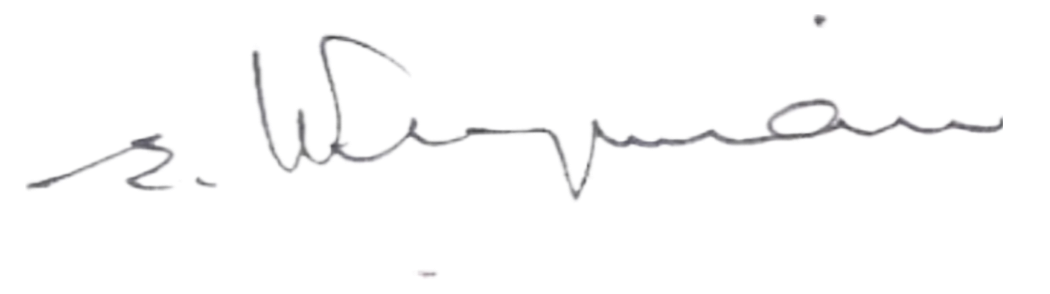
- Signature
- Military career
- Allegiance: United Kingdom; Israel
- Branch: British Army; Royal Air Force; Israeli Air Force
- Service years: 1942–1945 (UK); 1946–1969 (Israel)
- Rank: Aluf (Major General)
- Commands: Chief of Operations on the General Staff; Commander of Ramat David; Commander of the Israeli Air Force; Deputy Chief of the General Staff
- Conflicts: World War II; 1947–1949 Palestine war Suez Crisis; Six-Day War; War of Attrition

Ezer Weizman (Hebrew: עֵזֶר וַיְצְמָן, romanized: Ezer Vaytsman, pronounced [ˈezeʁ ˈvaitsman]; 15 June 1924 – 24 April 2005) was an Israeli major general and politician who served as the president of Israel, first elected in 1993 and re-elected in 1998. Before the presidency, Weizman was commander of the Israeli Air Force and Minister of Defense.

== Biography ==
Ezer Weizman was born in Tel Aviv in the British Mandate of Palestine on 15 June 1924 to Yechiel and Yehudit Weizmann. His father was an agronomist originally from Pinsk, whereas his mother's family had been among the founders of Rishon LeZion. Weizman was a nephew of Israel's first president, Chaim Weizmann.

He grew up in Acre and Haifa, and attended the Hebrew Reali School. He married Reuma Schwartz, sister of Ruth Dayan, wife of Moshe Dayan, and they had two children, Shaul and Michal.

Weizman enlisted in the British Army in 1942 during World War II and served as a truck driver in the Western Desert campaign in Egypt and Libya. In 1943, he joined the Royal Air Force (RAF) and attended aviation school in Rhodesia. He served with the RAF in Egypt and then India until 1945. Weizman ended his service in the RAF as a sergeant pilot but did not obtain any operational experience.

Between 1944 and 1946, he was a member of the Irgun underground in Mandatory Palestine. From 1946 to 1947, he studied aeronautics in England. During 1947, in the midst of his studies, he became involved in a plot to assassinate General Evelyn Barker, commander of the British forces in Mandatory Palestine at the time. He and another Irgun operative had planned to mine the road outside Barker's house in London, but after attracting the suspicions of Scotland Yard, he left England, ending the plot.

== Military career ==
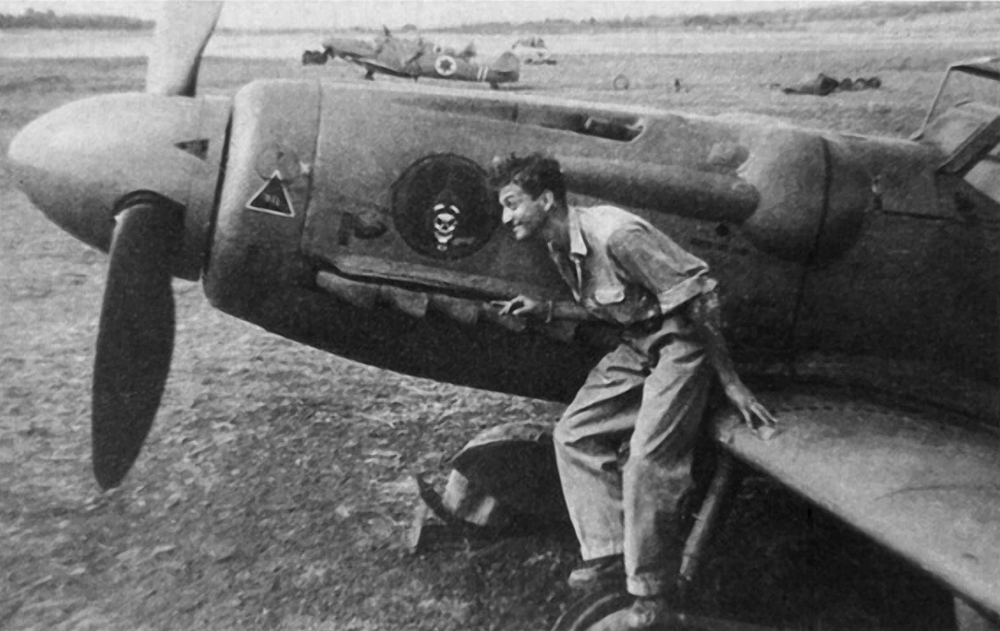
Weizman sits upon the wing root of an Avia S-199, a Czechoslovak-built version of the Bf 109.

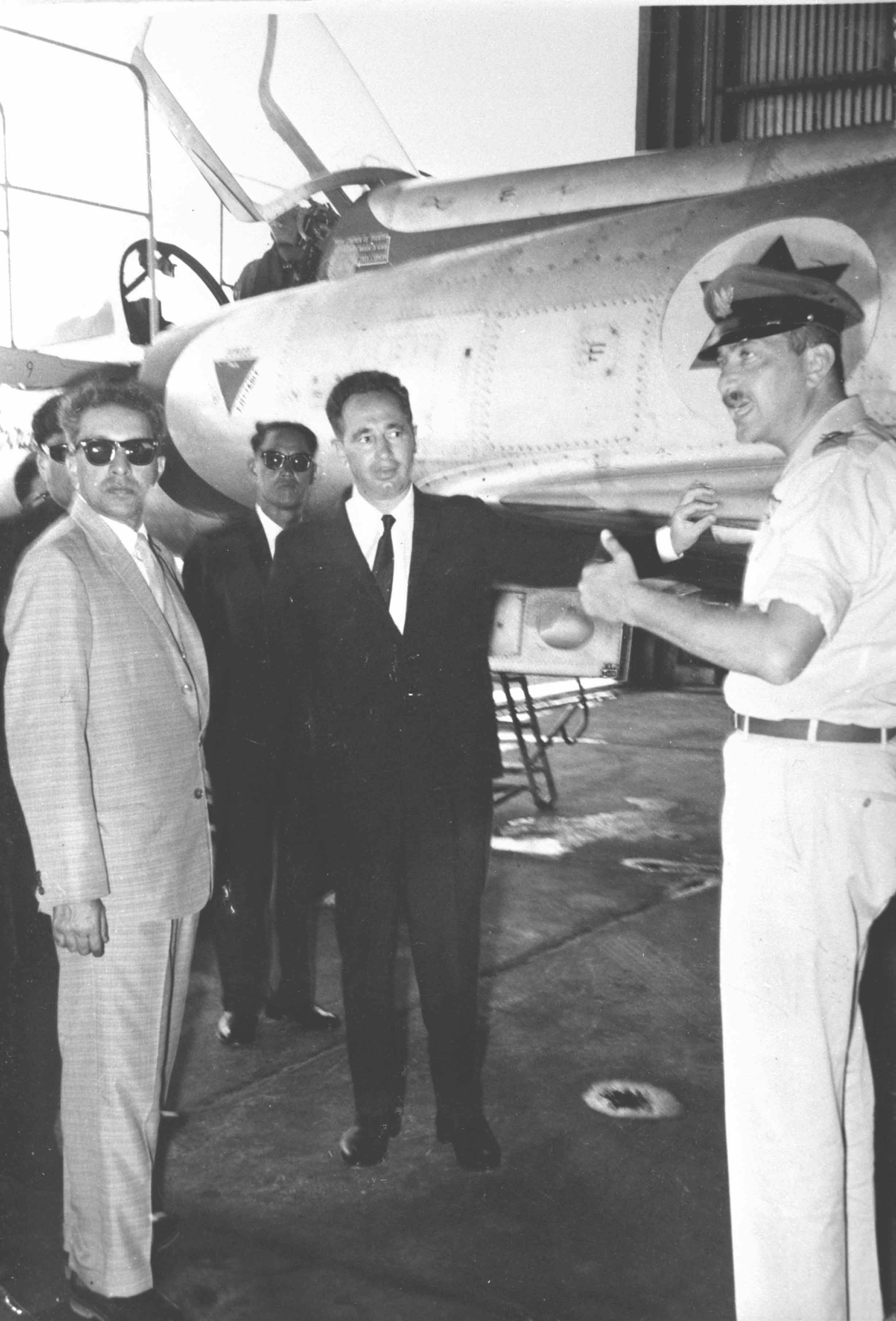
King Mahendra of Nepal (left) visiting Israel, accompanied by Shimon Peres, Director General of the Ministry of Defense (middle), and Air Force commander Maj. Gen. Ezer Weizman (right) with a IAF Mirage III in the background, 1958.

After the establishment of the State of Israel, Weizman was a pilot for the Haganah in the 1948 Arab–Israeli War. He was the commander of the Negev Air Squadron near Nir-Am. In May 1948, he learned to fly the Avia S-199 (Messerschmitt Bf 109) at the České Budějovice air base in Czechoslovakia (Operation Balak) and participated in Israel's first fighter mission (executed by its "first fighter squadron"), a ground attack on an Egyptian column advancing toward Ad Halom near the Arab town of Isdud south of Tel Aviv. In a battle between Israeli and neutral British RAF aircraft on 7 January 1949, he flew one of four Israeli Spitfire fighters that attacked 19 British fighters, which were on a rescue mission in Egypt searching for four aircraft on a reconnaissance flight that had been destroyed in an earlier IAF attack, with the IAF pilots falsely claiming the RAF aircraft were attacking Israeli ground forces. An RAF Hawker Tempest was shot down by the IAF, resulting in the death of the pilot. Due to an oversight by ground crewmen, most of the RAF aircraft were not able to fire.

Weizman joined the Israel Defense Forces and served as the Chief of Operations on the General Staff. In 1951 he attended the RAF Staff College, Andover in England. Upon his return he became commander of Ramat David.

Weizman served as the commander of the Israeli Air Force between 1958 and 1966, and later served as deputy Chief of the General Staff. In 1966, he oversaw the defection of an Iraqi fighter pilot and his MiG fighter which gave Israel vital intelligence information.

In 1967, he directed the early morning surprise air attacks against the Egyptian air bases, which resulted in giving the Israelis total air superiority over the Sinai battlefields by totally destroying the Egyptian Air Force in 3 hours. A total of 400 enemy planes were destroyed by the Israeli Air Force on the first day of the Six-Day War.

Although he became the IDF's Deputy Chief of Staff in 1966, he retired from military service in 1969.

== Political career ==
Upon retiring from the military, Weizman joined the right-wing Gahal party. He served as Minister of Transportation in Levi Eshkol's national unity government until Gahal left the coalition in 1970. Weizman quit Gahal in 1972, but returned in 1976, by which time it had become Likud.

In 1977, he became Defense Minister under Menachem Begin. During his term, Israel developed the IAI Lavi fighter and launched the Litani Operation against the PLO in south Lebanon.

After Donald Neff wrote an article for Time magazine reporting an incident at Beit Jala, where a school was surrounded, the doors shut and canisters of gas fired into it, Weizman had a commission investigate Palestinian claims that it was part of an Israeli army campaign against youths in the West Bank which resulted in numerous Palestinians having their arms and legs broken and their heads shaved. When the commission confirmed that the Beit Jala story was true he fired the military governor of the West Bank, Brigadier General David Hagoel, for abusing Palestinians.

Over time, Weizman's views became more dovish. After the visit to Jerusalem of Egypt's president Anwar Sadat in 1977, Weizman (who spoke Arabic) developed a close friendship with him and the Egyptian negotiators Boutros Boutros-Ghali and Hosni Mubarak. Sadat was quoted as saying: "Weizman is the only Israeli personality I can deal with ... He is my younger brother." These relations were a crucial factor in the talks that culminated in the 1978 Camp David Accords, followed by a peace treaty with Egypt the following year.

In May 1980, Weizman quit the government. He considered establishing a new party with Moshe Dayan, which led to his ousting from Likud. For the next four years, he put politics on hold and entered the business world.

In 1984, he established a new party, Yahad, which won three seats in the 1984 elections. The party joined a national unity government in which Shimon Peres and Yitzhak Shamir served as prime ministers in rotation. In October 1986, Yahad merged with the Alignment, after Yossi Sarid and the Mapam party left the coalition. Between 1984 and 1990, Weizman was Minister for Arab Affairs and then Minister of Science and Technology. In 1992, the Alignment became the Israeli Labor Party.

== Presidency ==
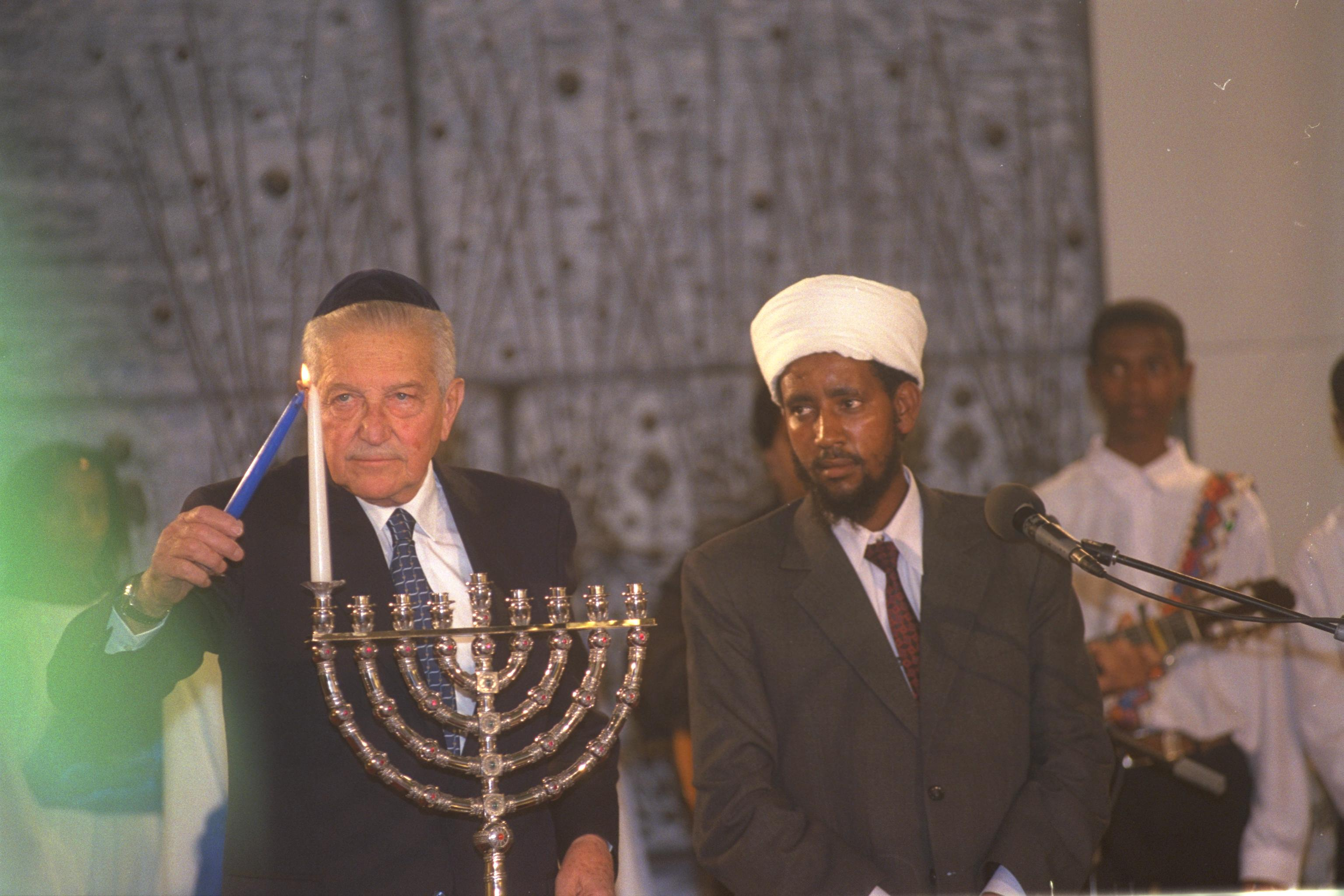
Weizman lighting the first candle of a Channukia in Hannukah. In the background is an Israeli volcanic ash artwork by Moshe Castel.

On 24 March 1993, the Knesset elected Weizman, by a majority of 66 to 53 (against Dov Shilansky, the Likud candidate), to serve as the next president of Israel. He assumed office as president on 13 May 1993.

In 1996, in an attempt to promote the peace process, Weizman invited Yasser Arafat for a private visit to his home in Caesarea. In 1999, he met with the DFLP leader Nayef Hawatmeh, declaring "I am even prepared to meet with the devil if it helps [to bring peace]." He openly supported withdrawal from the Golan Heights in exchange for peace with Syria, drawing criticism from the right wing parties.

At the end of 1999, newspapers published allegations that Weizman had accepted large sums of money from businessmen before becoming president, without reporting this to the proper authorities. Since the statute of limitations had expired Weizman was not prosecuted, but the controversy compelled him to resign. Weizman's resignation took effect on 13 July 2000.

== Death ==
Weizman died of respiratory failure at his home in Caesarea on 24 April 2005, at the age of 80. He is not buried on Mt. Herzl, where Israeli presidents and prime ministers are usually interred, but alongside his son and daughter-in-law in Or Akiva.

== Gallery ==
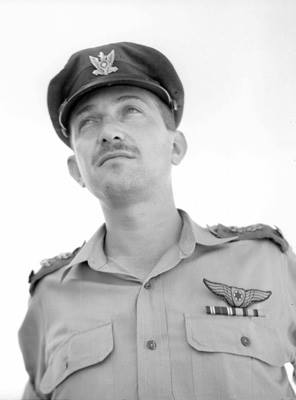
Ezer Weizman 1958.

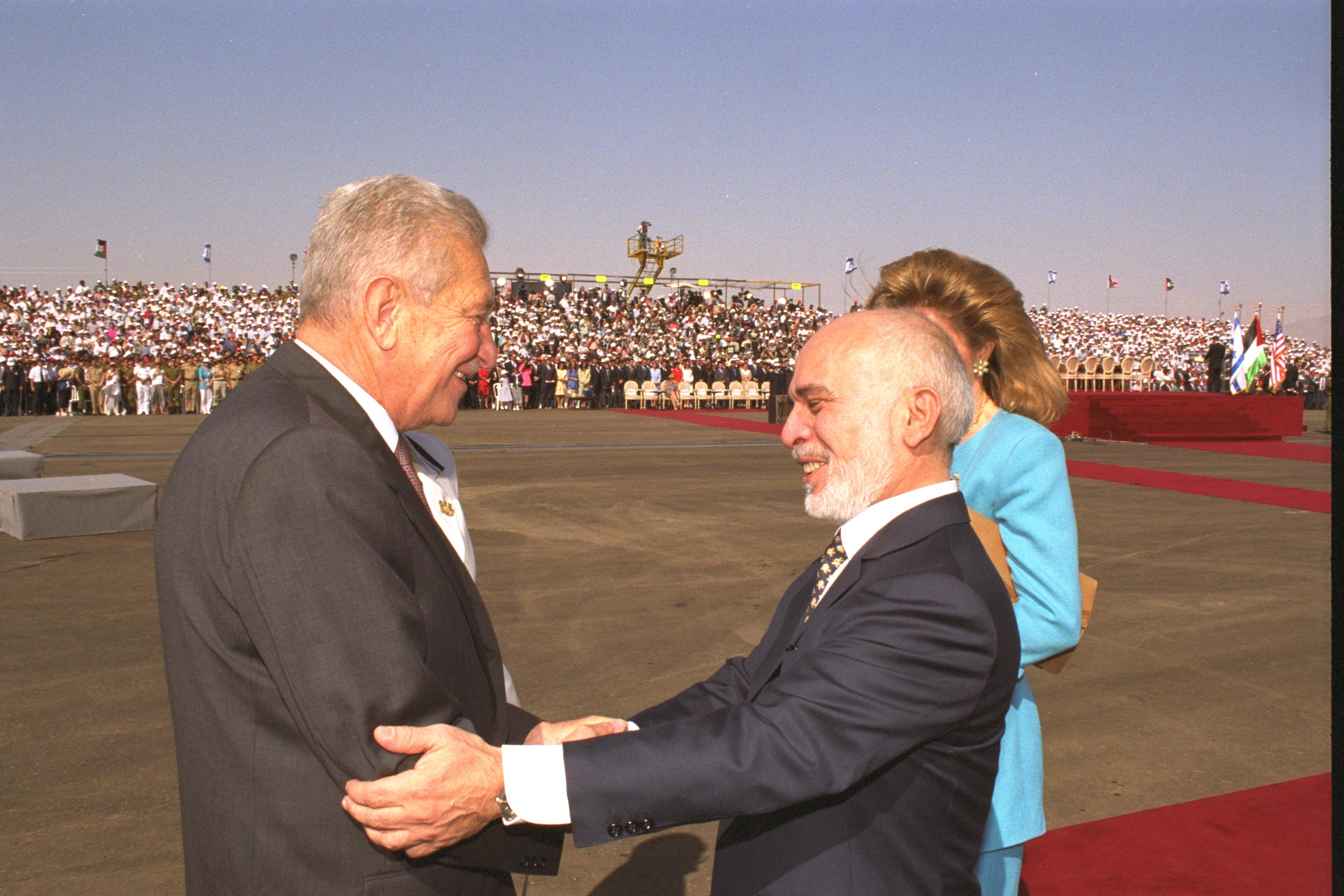
Ezer Weizman greeting King Hussein of Jordan.

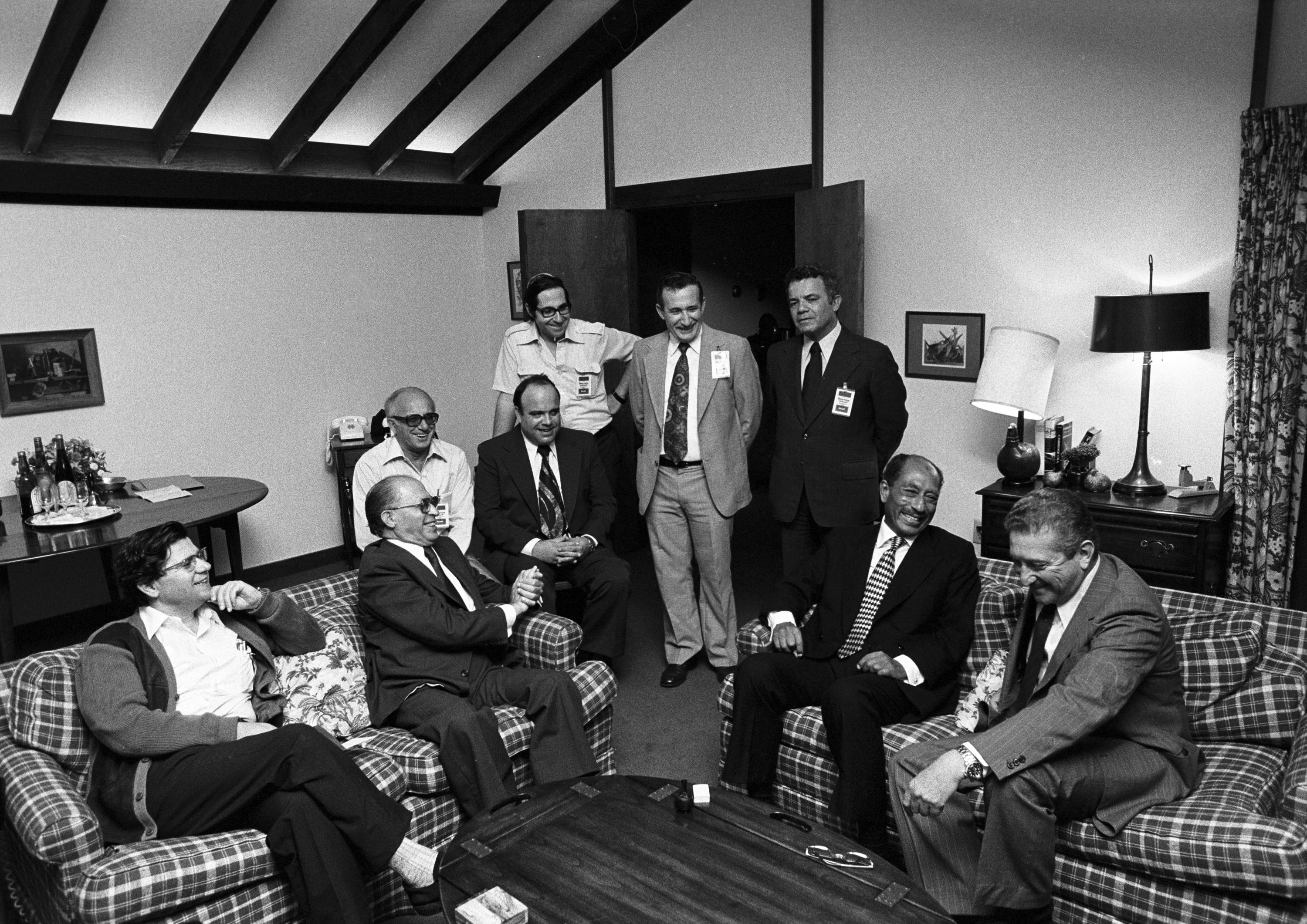
A meeting at Camp David with (l-r) Aharon Barak, Menachem Begin, Anwar Sadat, and Ezer Weizmann, 1978.

== Awards and recognition ==
- 1996: Order of the White Lion, civil division, 1st Class with collar
- 1999: Collar Class of the Order of the Star of Romania.

== Published works ==
- Weizman, Ezer (1976). On Eagles' Wings: The Personal Story of the Leading Commander of the Israeli Air Force. New York: Macmillan Publishing Co., Inc. ISBN 0-02-625790-4.
- Ruth, Sof (2002) (Hebrew, idiomatically: "Over and Out")

Military offices
Preceded by Dan Tolkowsky	Commander of Israeli Air Force; 1958–1966	Succeeded by Mordechai Hod
Political offices
Preceded by Moshe Carmel	Minister of Transportation; 1969–1970	Succeeded by Shimon Peres
Preceded by Shimon Peres	Minister of Defense; 1977–1980	Succeeded by Menachem Begin
Preceded by Gideon Patt	Minister of Science and Technology; 1988–1990	Succeeded by Yuval Ne'eman
Preceded by Chaim Herzog	President of Israel; 1993–2000	Succeeded by Moshe Katsav
