= Tikun Olam =

Tikun Olam may refer to:

- Tikkun olam, a concept in Judaism
- Tikun Olam (blog)
- Tikun Olam (cannabis), medical marijuana firm in Israel

== See also ==
- Tikkun (disambiguation)
