= Gila Katsav =

Israeli public figure (born 1948)

- גילה קצב
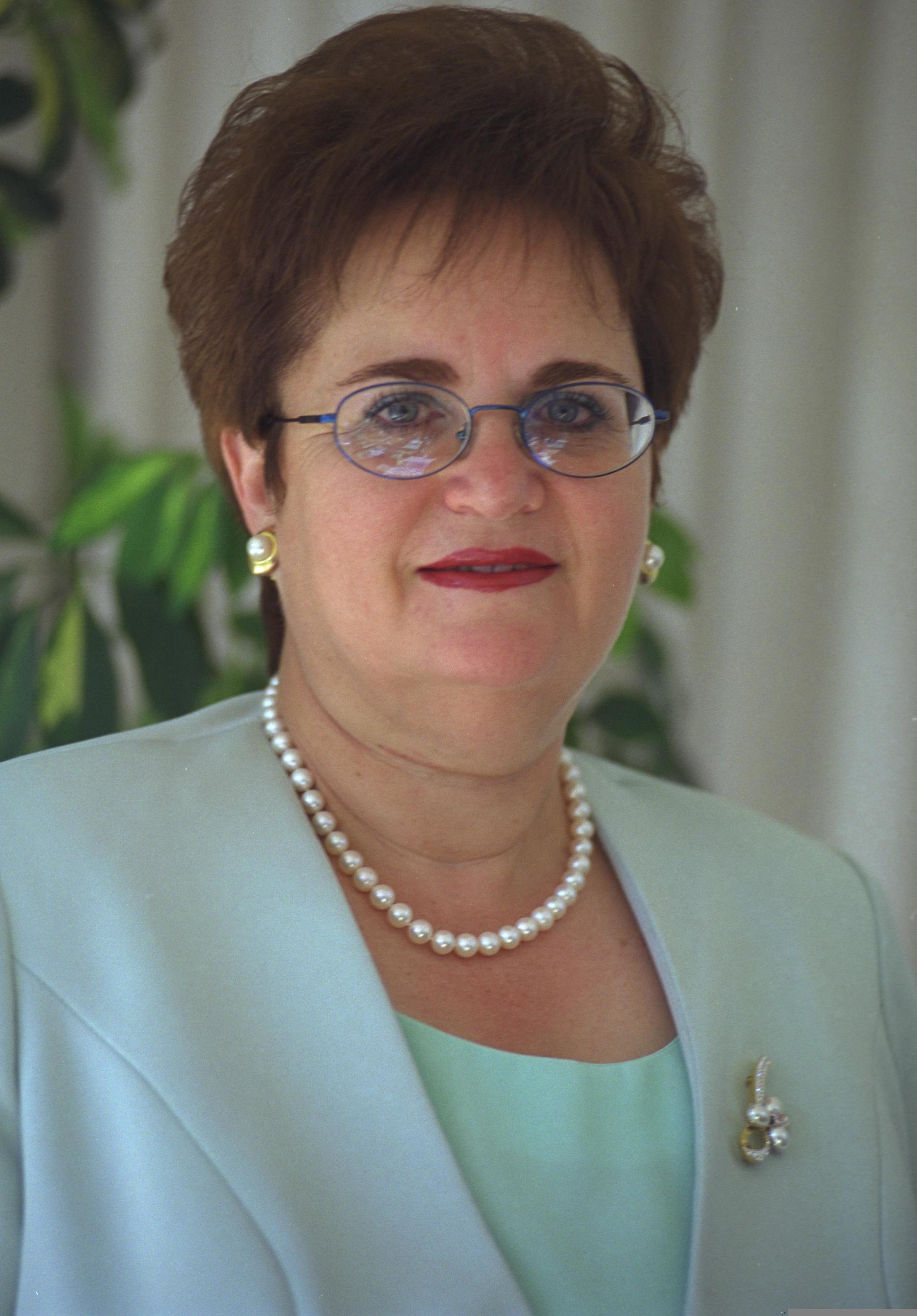
- Katsav in 2001

First Lady of Israel
- In role 1 August 2000 – 1 July 2007
- President: Moshe Katsav
- Preceded by: Reuma Weizman
- Succeeded by: Sonia Peres

Personal details
- Born: 1948 (age 77–78) Tel Aviv, Israel
- Spouse: Moshe Katsav (m. 1969)
- Children: 5

Gila Katsav (Hebrew: גילה קצב; born 1948) is an Israeli public figure who served as the First Lady of Israel from 2000 until 2007 as the wife of former President Moshe Katsav.

== Biography ==
Gila Katsav was born in Tel Aviv. She is of Polish-Jewish and Ukrainian-Jewish ancestry. One of her grandfathers was among the founders of Bnei Brak. In 1969, she married Moshe Katsav. The couple has five children, four sons and a daughter, and two grandchildren.

Katsav is involved in personal volunteer activities for children who come from disadvantaged families as part of the efforts of “The Council for the Sheltered Child. She also volunteered for the Rehabilitation Department of Yad Sarah, a voluntary organization which specializes in providing home care and lending medical equipment without charge.

Katsav served as the First Lady of Israel from 2000 until 2007 during the tenure of her husband. In May 2005, Katsav led U.S. First Lady Laura Bush on a tour of the Yad Vashem and a controversial visit to the Western Wall.

Gila Katsav publicly defended her husband, then-President Moshe Katsav, against allegations of rape and sexual harassment. In September 2006, she told journalists attending an exhibition at the Jerusalem Theater, "I have no doubt that my husband is innocent. I'm certain that the truth will come to light...We are undergoing difficult times, but we're alright and will get through them." President Katsav resigned from office in 2007 as part of a plea deal, but was convicted of rape and obstruction of justice in 2010. She accompanied her husband upon his release from Ma'asiyahu Prison in December 2015.

Honorary titles
Preceded by Reuma Weizman	First Lady of Israel; 2000–2007	Succeeded by Sonia Peres
