= Maasiyahu Prison =

Prison in Ramle, Israel

Coordinates: 31°56′9.25″N 34°52′59.41″E

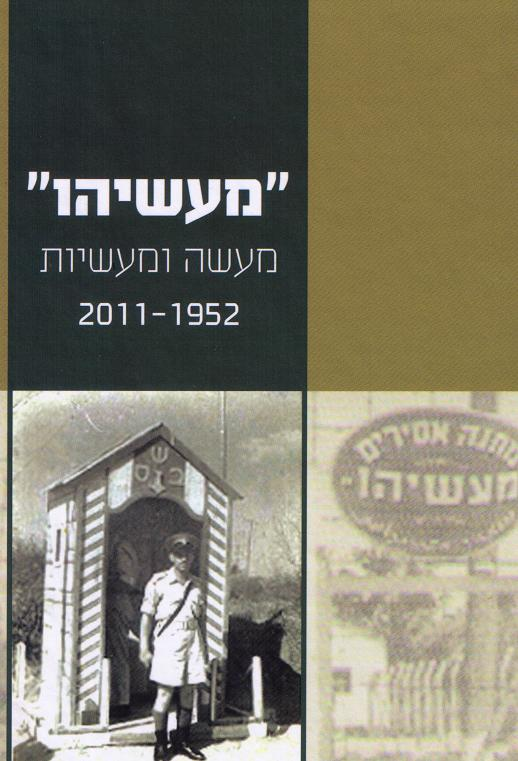
Book about Maasiyahu Prison

Maasiyahu Prison is a minimum-security prison in Ramle, Israel, run by the Israel Prison Service.

== History ==
Prisoners who have proven responsible have access to various places of employment and education programs, the right to take vacations from prison, as well as rehabilitative treatment through various methods including therapy animals. Prisoners who have a history of problematic behavior are held under tighter security and are not permitted to take vacations. There is a special wing for religious inmates called the Torani wing, also known as "Beis Medrash Maasiyahu", where inmates spend most of the day praying and studying Torah and other sacred Jewish texts in two seminaries and do not have access to television and newspapers. The whole prison complex is located in the city of Ramla in the Central District of Israel.

In 2002, inmates declared a hunger strike to protest what they viewed as improper medical and legal treatment.

In 2004, public workers from the nearby town of Lod, who had not been paid in months, chained themselves to the gates of the prison in a public protest, demanding to be arrested so they could be fed the free prison food.

In 2005, a wing of the prison was converted to house those detained while protesting Sharon's plan to withdraw from 21 settlements in Gaza and another 4 in the West Bank. The new wing can house 900 detainees.

== Notable inmates ==
- Baruch Abuhatzeira, rabbi, spiritual leader and son of the Baba Sali
- Shlomo Benizri, Israeli politician and member of the Shas party (started as 4 years, reduced to 2 years and 8 months)
- Aryeh Deri, Israeli politician and one of the founders of the Shas ultra-Orthodox religious party (22 months)
- Binyamin Ze'ev Kahane (1966–2000), far-right Israeli politician
- Meir Kahane (1932–1990), ultra-nationalist American-Israeli politician
- Moshe Katsav, former President of Israel and convicted rapist (7 years, served 5 years)
- Ehud Olmert, former Prime Minister of Israel, convicted in the Holyland Case of bribery while serving as the mayor of Jerusalem and later obstruction of justice (19 months)
- Yishai Schlissel, convicted criminal who stabbed marchers at the Jerusalem gay pride parade in 2005 and 2015 (10 years)
- Ami Popper, Israeli mass murderer,
- Jaggi Singh, Canadian anarchist, anti-globalization and social justice activists (1 day)
