= Reuma Weizman =

First Lady of Israel from 1993–2000

- ראומה ויצמן
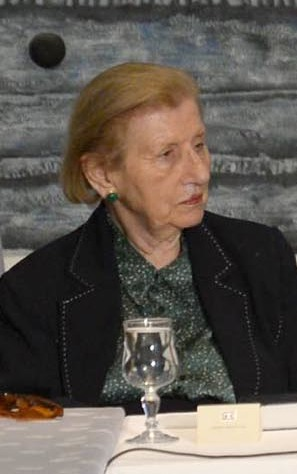
- Weizman in 2015

First Lady of Israel
- In role 13 May 1993 – 13 July 2000
- President: Ezer Weizman
- Preceded by: Aura Herzog
- Succeeded by: Gila Katsav

Personal details
- Born: Reuma Schwartz; 18 August 1925 London, England
- Died: 15 April 2025 (aged 99) Or Akiva, Israel
- Spouse: Ezer Weizman (m. 1950; died 2005)
- Children: 2

Reuma Weizman (Hebrew: ראומה ויצמן; née Schwartz; 18 August 1925 – 15 April 2025) was an Israeli public figure and the wife of the seventh President of Israel, Ezer Weizman, who served in this position from 13 May 1993 to 13 July 2000.

== Early life ==
Reuma Schwartz was born in London, England, on 18 August 1925. Her parents, Zvi, born in Novoselytsia, and Rachel, born in Kishinev (daughter of Dov Klimker), were members of the Second Aliyah, founders of the Mapai party and the Faculty of Law at the Hebrew University of Jerusalem. Reuma's older sister was Ruth, who later married Moshe Dayan.

Zvi and Rachel traveled with two-year-old Ruth to England for Zvi's law studies. A year after the birth of Reuma, the family returned to Mandatory Palestine, and settled in Jerusalem in the Rehavia neighborhood. At the age of nine, Reuma moved to Kibbutz Mishmar HaEmek. Her parents, who were preoccupied with the family's livelihood and public activities, decided that kibbutz education would benefit their daughter.

== Volunteer work ==
After leaving Mishmar HaEmek, Reuma underwent agricultural training at Kibbutz Nir David and completed a teaching course at the Kibbutzim College in Tel Aviv. When she was looking for a job, Reuma went to a children's home in a suburb of Hamburg that was under the Jewish Agency and the Red Cross, where she worked for about two years with children who were World War II refugees.

After the 1947–1949 Palestine war, Reuma returned to Israel and served in the Women's Corps as a clerk in the Government Press Office.

Prior to her arrival at the Presidential Residence of Israel, Reuma worked extensively for children with Intellectual disabilities in various social organizations.

== First Lady ==
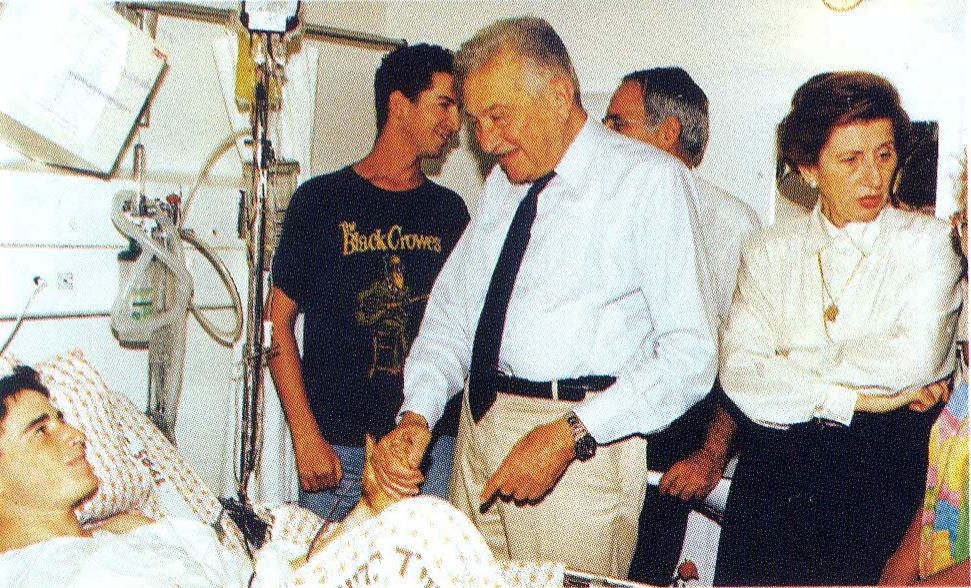
Weizman with her husband President Ezer Weizman in 1998

During her husband's tenure, she opened the President's House to non-profit organizations that organized camps for children with cancer. During the period of the absorption of the large waves of aliyah, she toured the absorption camps sites throughout Israel and cared for the welfare of the immigrants, especially from Ethiopia. Weizmann worked to open the President's House to exhibitions of many Israeli artists, and many of their works were given by the President, with her encouragement, to high-ranking guests outside Israel. She also opened the exhibitions to the general public in order to bring Israeli art closer to the people. Weizmann initiated the "Good Deed Award" which aims to "praise the good deeds of citizens, that were done for the benefit of all, free of charge, in a voluntary framework, which constitutes an example and role model for all of us."

== Personal life ==
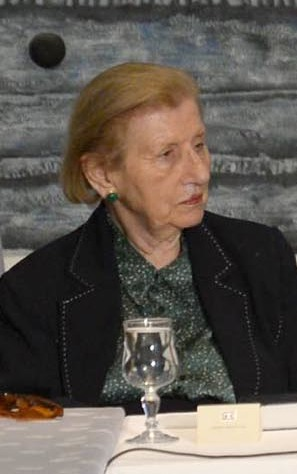
Weizman in 2015

Reuma met Ezer Weizmann in 1949 when he and Mordechai Hod stopped for her for a ride on the way to a memorial service for Modi Alon. They were married in 1950 in the yard of the home of her sister and husband, Ruth and Moshe Dayan. Moshe Dayan was then the commander of Jerusalem, and the family home was located in Villa Leah in the Rehavia neighborhood of Jerusalem. The couple was married by Chief Rabbi Yitzhak HaLevi Herzog.

In 1951 Ezer Weizmann was accepted to study in the British Air Force and the couple moved to England, where their eldest son Shaul was born. Their daughter Michal was born four years later. Shaul was severely wounded in the canal front during the War of Attrition when an Egyptian sniper shot him on the head. In 1991, Shaul was killed with his wife in a car accident and they were both buried in the cemetery in Or Akiva. In March 1991, a woman sued the Weizmann couple and the estate of their son Shaul, claiming that Shaul was the father of her son. A tissue test that the Weizmann couple underwent proved that the boy is indeed Shaul's son.

Weizman died in Or Akiva, Israel on 15 April 2025, at the age of 99.

Honorary titles
Preceded by Aura Herzog	First Lady of Israel; 1993–2000	Succeeded by Gila Katsav
