= Baruch Abuhatzeira =

Moroccan rabbi

Baruch Abuhatzeira "The Baba Baruch"
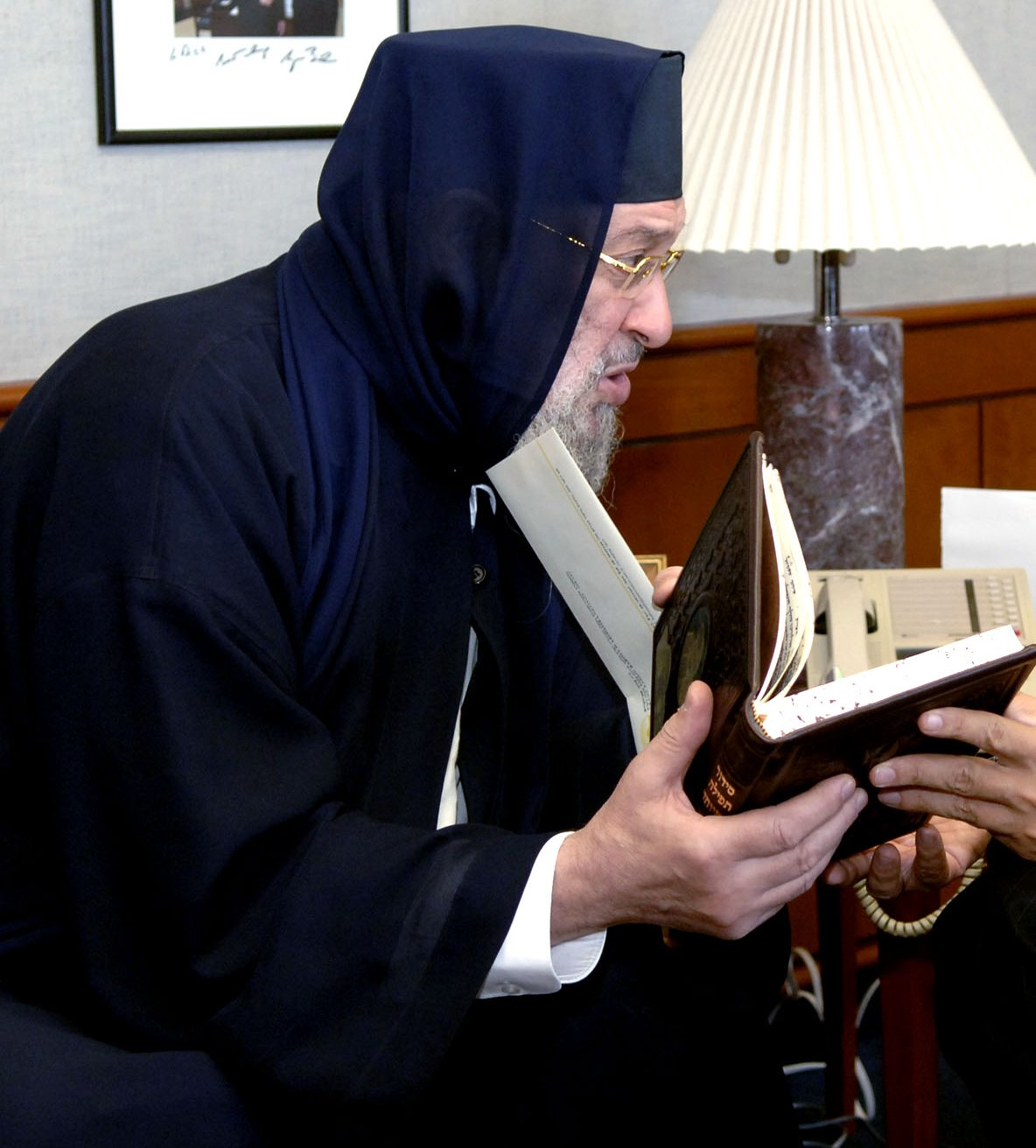

Personal life
- Born: 1941 (age 84–85) Arfoud, Morocco
- Parent: Israel Abuhatzeira (Baba Sali) (father)

Religious life
- Religion: Judaism
- Denomination: Haredi
- Residence: Netivot

Baruch Abuhatzeira (Hebrew: ברוך אבוחצירא; born 1941), also known as Baba Baruch, is a Moroccan-Israeli Kabbalist rabbi and spiritual adviser who operates in Netivot, a blue-collar town in southern Israel. He is the son of the leading Moroccan rabbi Israel Abuhatzeira, also known as the Baba Sali, and thus scion of the Abu Hasira/Abuhatzeira family.

Baruch was born in Arfoud in the Tafilalt region in eastern Morocco. There, he was educated by his father. During his youth Baruch spent several years in Paris. In the mid-1960s, Baruch emigrated to Israel with his father, and he decided to pursue a political career. He was elected deputy mayor in Ashkelon, and served on the city council as the leader of the local MAFDAL (National-Religious Party) faction. In this position, Abuhatzeira was convicted for taking bribes and served a five-year sentence in Maasiyahu prison. He has denied any wrongdoing and after his release, Abuhatzeira joined his father Baba Sali, and was with him during the last three months of the Rabbi's life.

During the shiva (week of mourning) on the death of the Baba Sali, Abuhatzeira donned his father's robe and announced himself as the Baba Sali's heir.
