= Tikkun =

Tikkun (Hebrew: תיקון, 'amending') or variants may refer to:

== Traditional uses ==
- Tikkun (book), a book used by Jews to prepare for reading or writing a Torah scroll
- Tohu and Tikun, two general stages in Jewish Kabbalah
- A night of studying the Torah, for example Tikkun Hoshana Rabbah and Tikkun Leil Shavuot

== Contemporary uses ==
- Tikkun (film), a 2015 Israeli film
- Tikkun (magazine), a quarterly interfaith Jewish magazine and website
- Tiqqun, a radical French philosophical journal

== See also ==
- Tikkun HaKlali, a set of ten psalms
- Tikkun olam, a Jewish concept
- Tikun Olam (disambiguation)
