= Rissani =

Rissani الريصاني
- Town
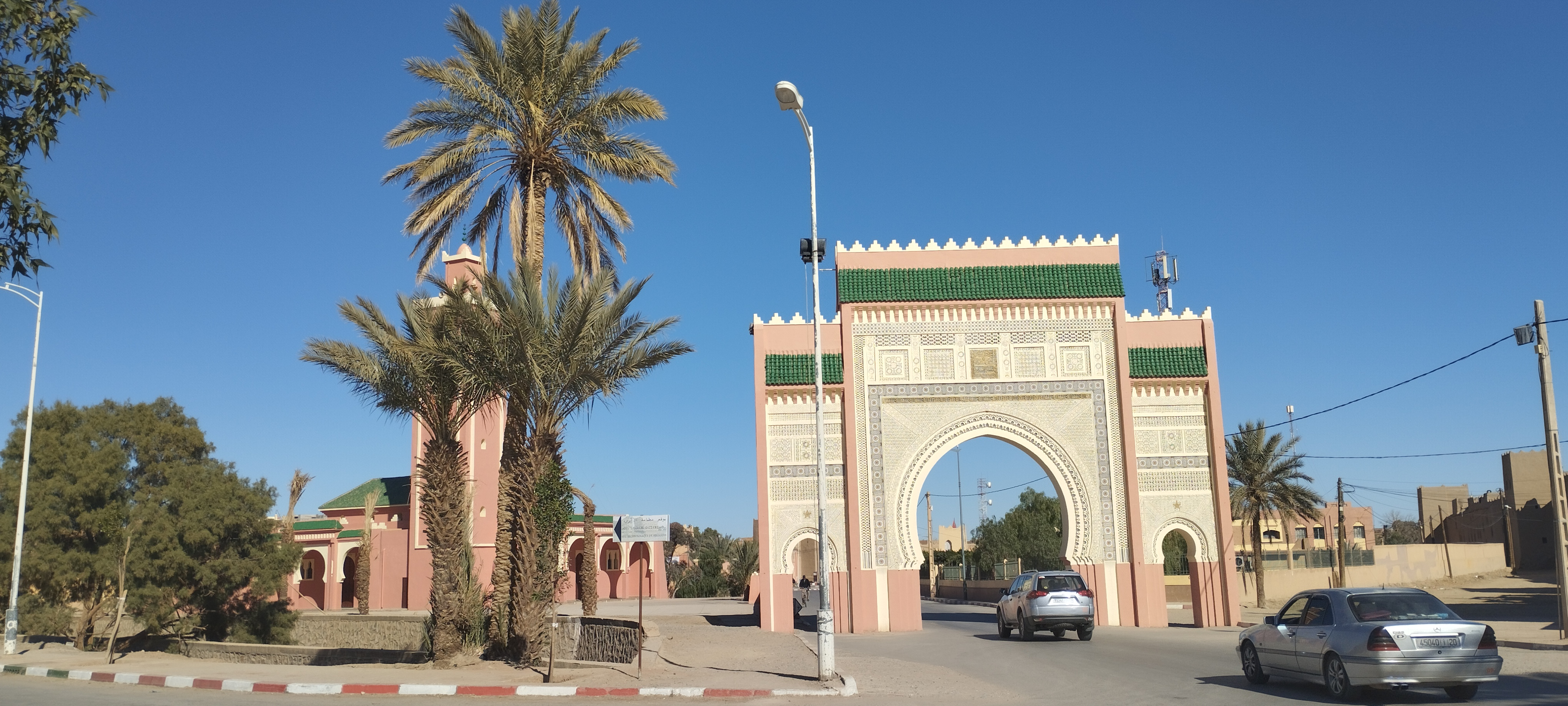
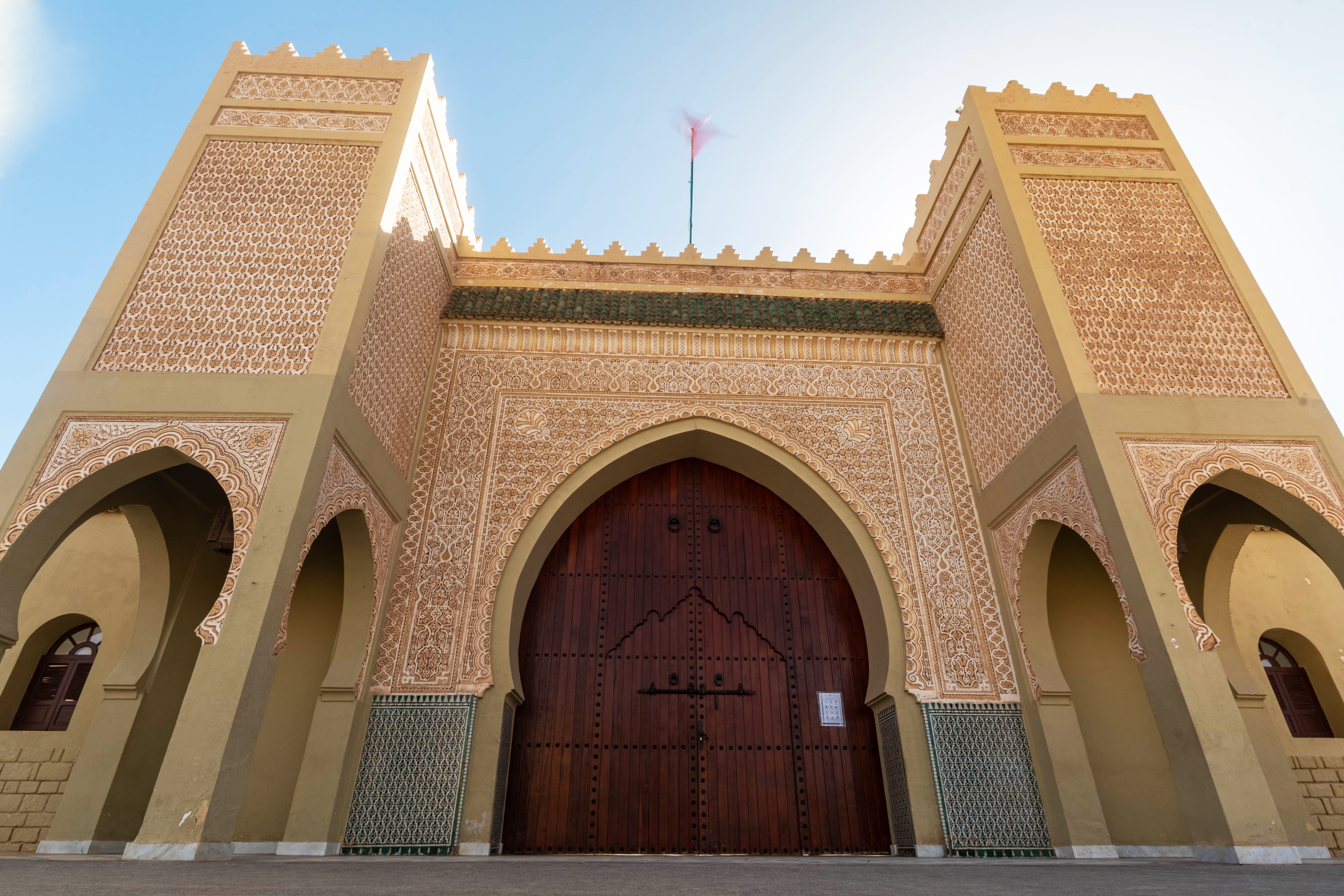
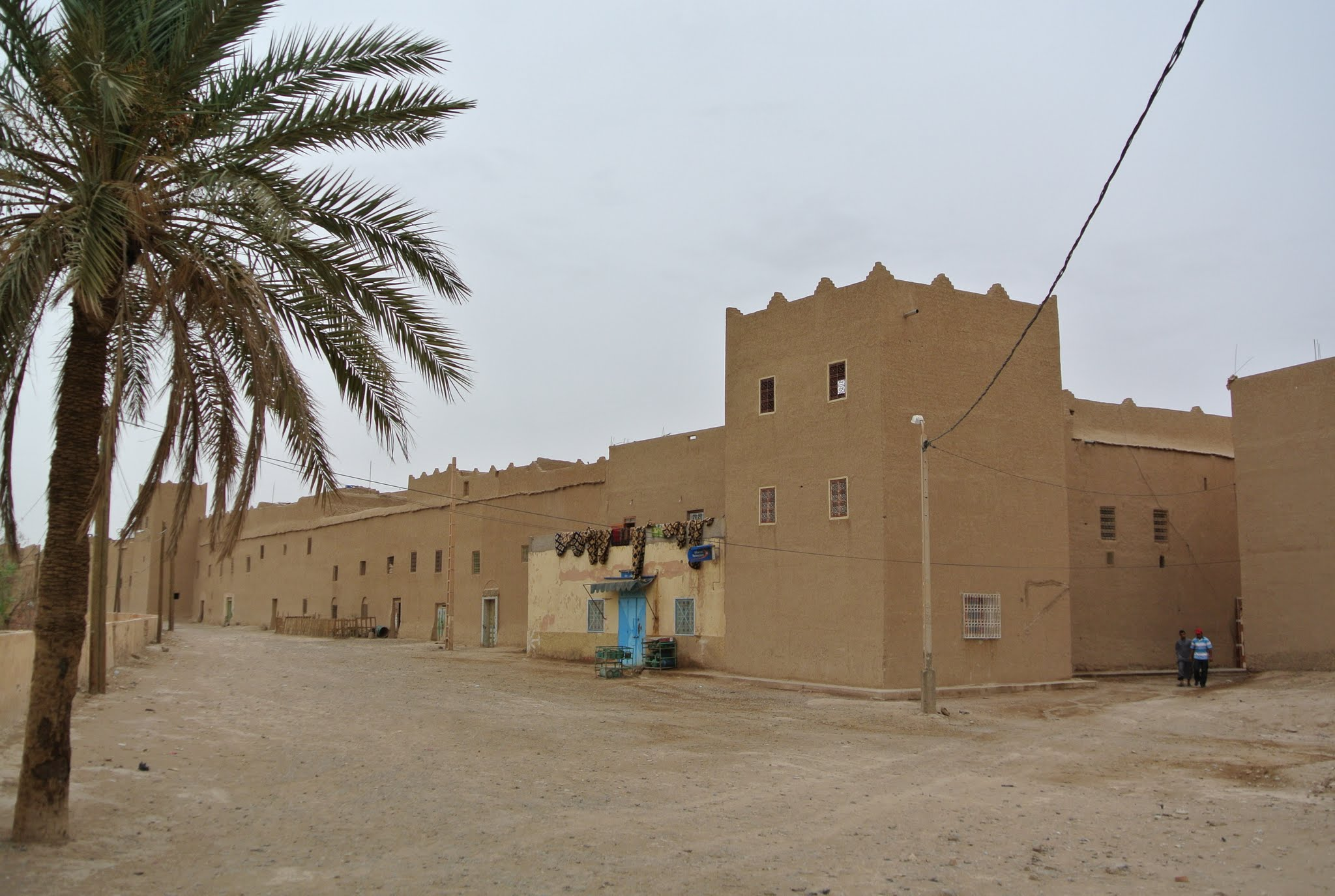
- Interactive map of Rissani
- Coordinates: 31°17′9″N 4°16′30″W
- Country: Morocco
- Region: Drâa-Tafilalet
- Province: Errachidia
- Elevation: 2,490 ft (760 m)

Population (2004)
  - Total: 20,469
- Time zone: UTC+0 (GMT)

Rissani (Arabic: الريصاني) is a town in Errachidia Province in eastern Morocco, located near Erfoud. It is the closest town of significant size to the Erg Chebbi, the largest sand desert in Morocco. Its population in 2004 was 20,469.

The mausoleum of Moulay Ali Cherif, third great-grandfather of Moulay Cherif, founder of the Alaouite Dynasty of Morocco, is located on the southern edge of town.

== History ==
Rissani is the ancient capital of Tafilalet. Its location as a crossroads between north and south gave the city a certain importance in previous times.

A former major caravan center, Rissani remains a major commercial center in the region, with a large souk, particularly lively on Tuesdays, Thursdays and Sundays. It is noted for its leather and goat skin trading.

In the 14th century, when a nearby city of Sijilmassa was destroyed, Rissani became a main city of trans-Saharan trade. It is assumed that Jews settled in Rissani to participate in the caravan trade, similar to other cities in Morocco. There is a Jewish cemetery in Rissani, which was renovated as a part of King Mohammed VI's project to restore Jewish cemeteries across Morocco. The famous Moroccan Jewish spiritual figure, the Baba Sali, was born in Rissani. David Abouhatzeira, brother of the Babi Sali and the chief rabbi of Nahariyah was born in Rissani and was buried in its Jewish cemetery.

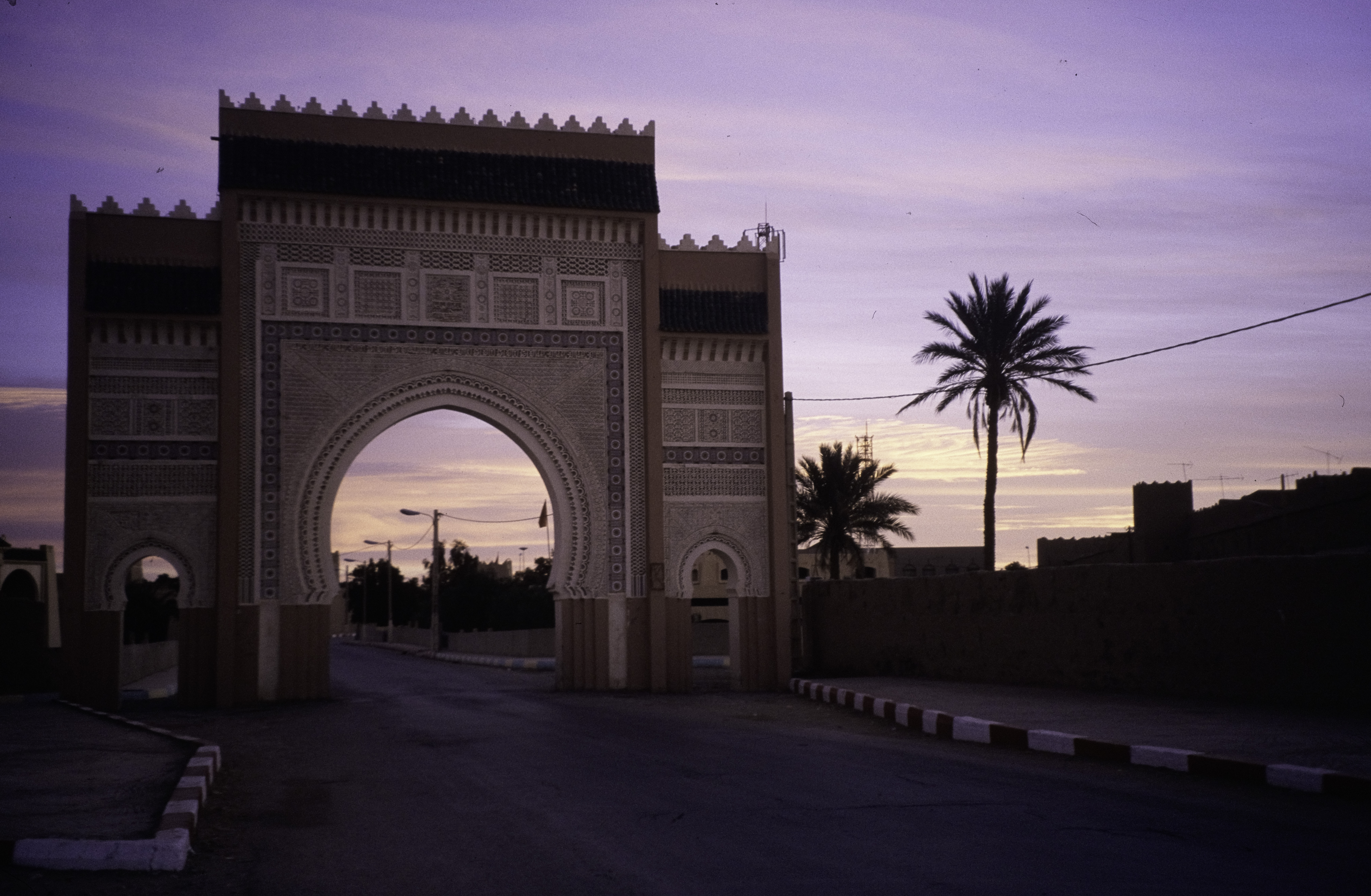
A Rissani city gate at dusk, 1990s.

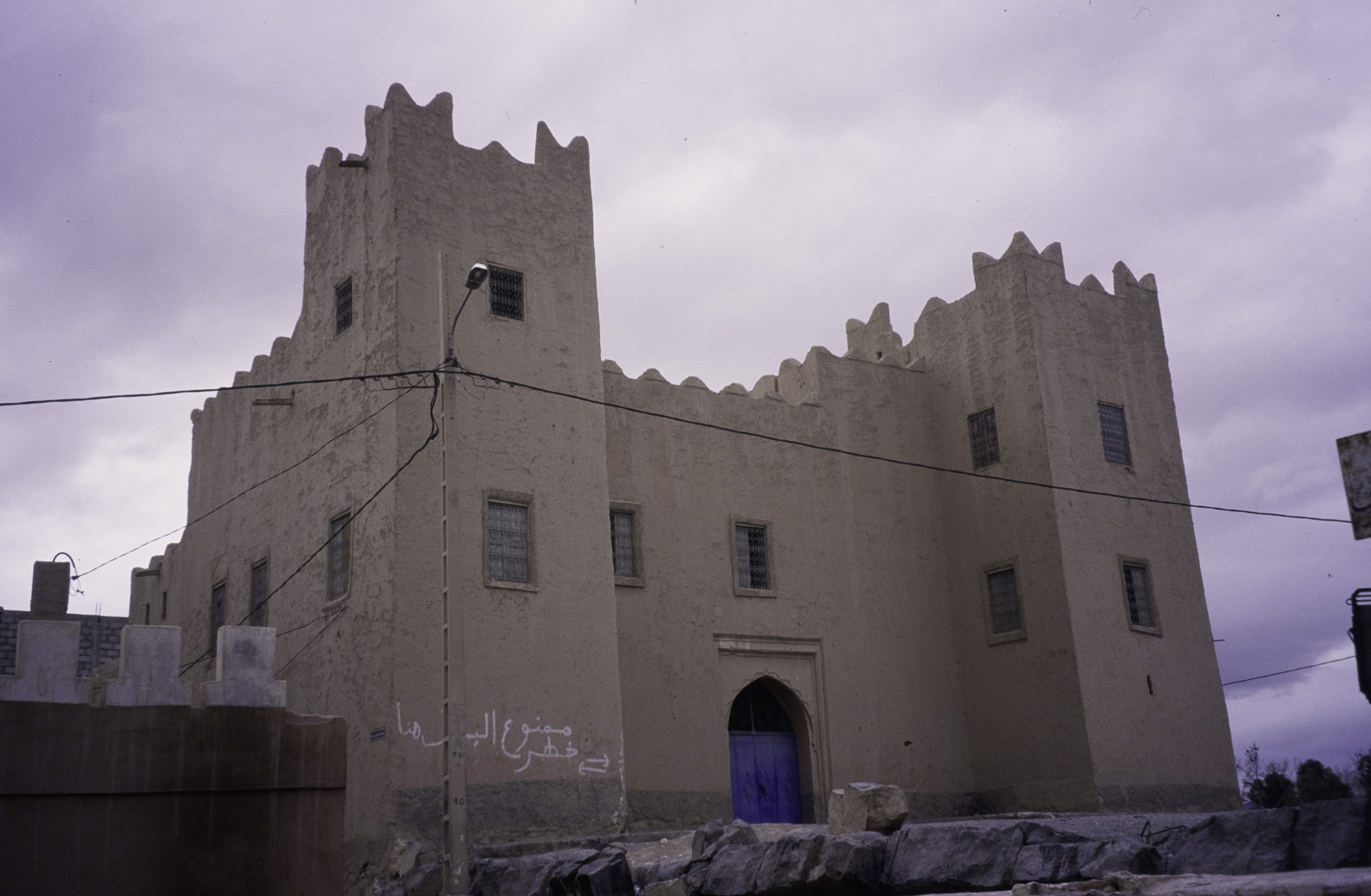
A castle at Rissani, 1990s.

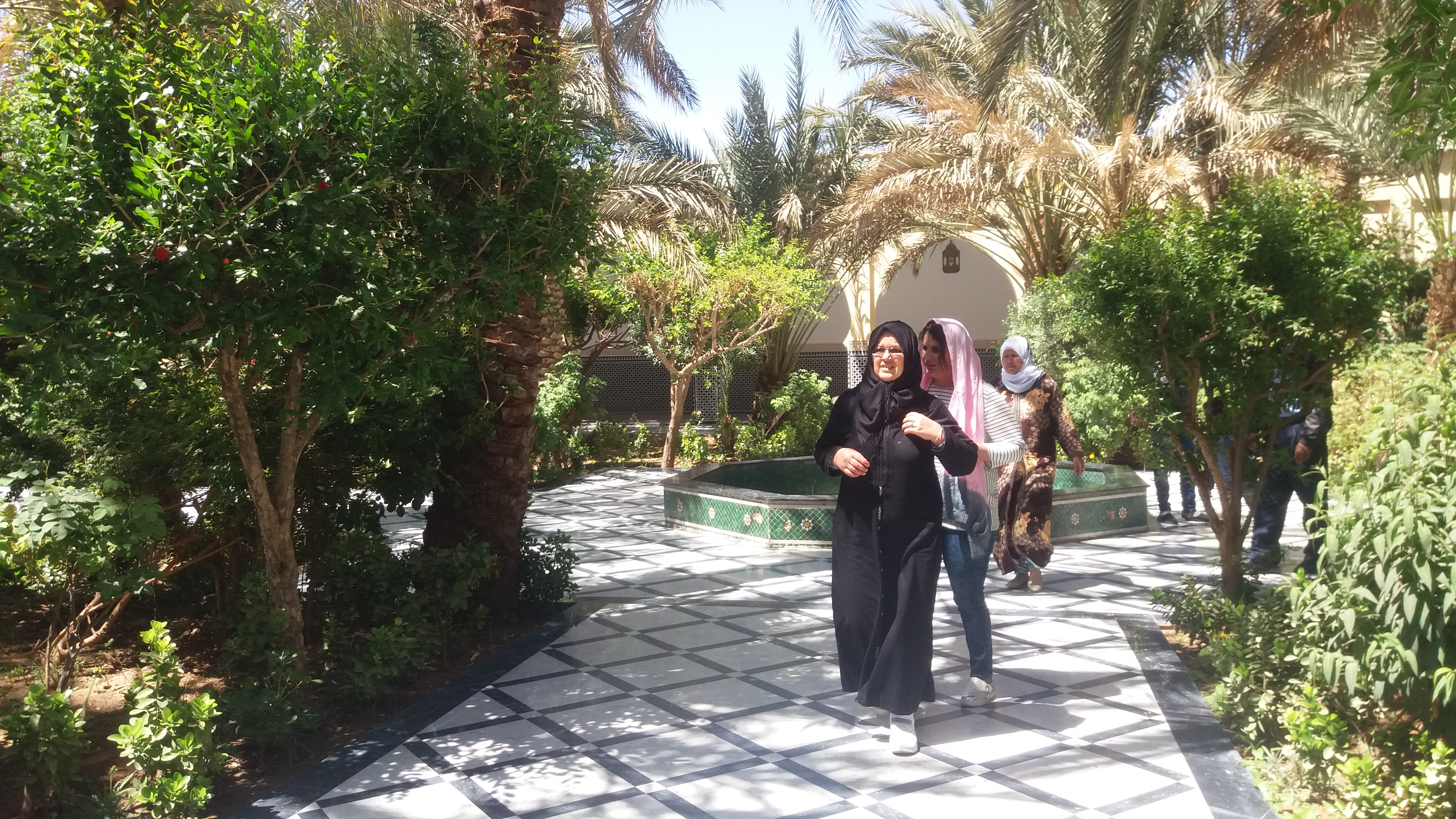
The mausoleum of Moulay Ali Sherif built in 1666.

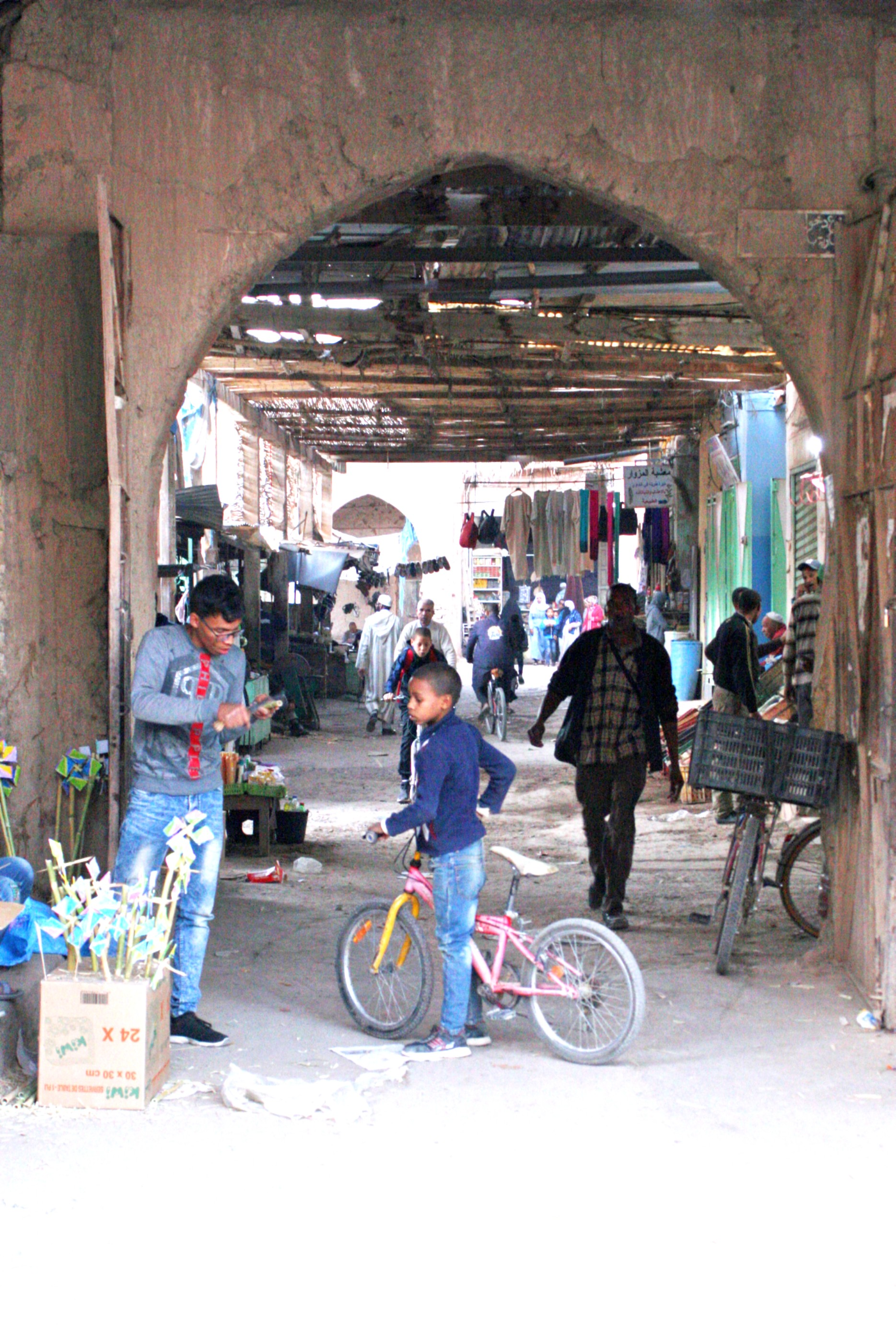
Souk in Rissani, 2019.
