= Moshe Katsav =

President of Israel from 2000 to 2007

- מֹשֶׁה קַצָּב
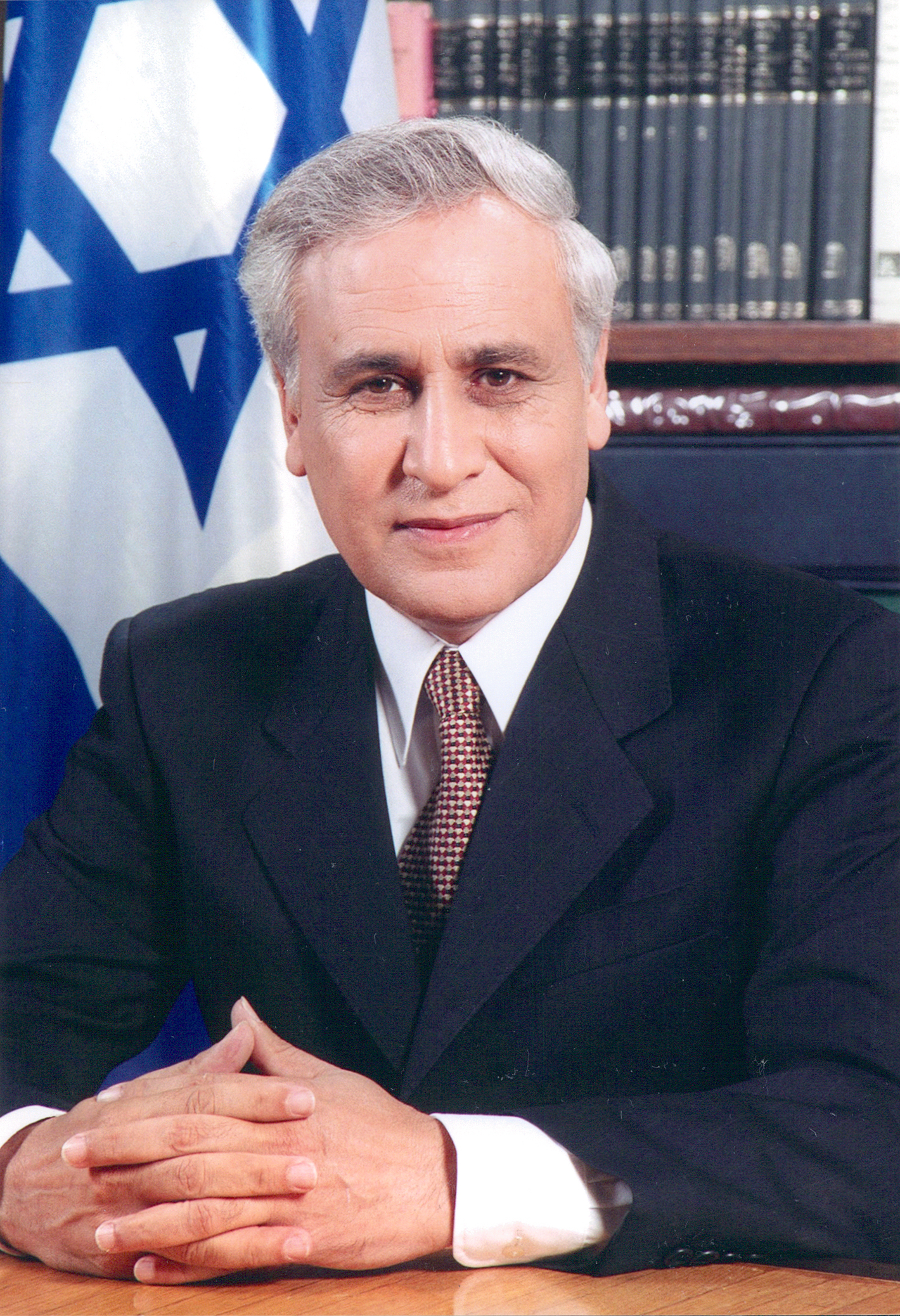
- Official portrait, 2000

8th President of Israel
- In office 1 August 2000 – 1 July 2007
- Prime Minister: Ehud Barak; Ariel Sharon; Ehud Olmert
- Preceded by: Ezer Weizman
- Succeeded by: Shimon Peres

Member of the Knesset
- In office 13 June 1977 – 31 July 2000

Personal details
- Born: Musa Qasab; 5 December 1945 (age 80) Yazd, Imperial State of Iran
- Party: Likud
- Spouse: Gila Katsav (m. 1969)
- Children: 5
- Profession: Politician

Moshe Katsav (Hebrew: מֹשֶׁה קַצָּב; born Musa Qassab; Persian: موسى قصاب; 5 December 1945) is an Israeli former politician who was the president of Israel from 2000 to 2007. He was also a leading Likud member of the Israeli Knesset and a minister in its cabinet. He was the first Mizrahi Jew to be elected to the presidency, and second non-Ashkenazi president after Yitzhak Navon. He is also the only ex-Israeli president to have been convicted of a crime.

The end of his presidency was marked by controversy, stemming from allegations of rape of one female subordinate and sexual harassment of others. Katsav resigned from the presidency in 2007 as part of a plea bargain. Katsav later rejected the deal with prosecutors and vowed he would prove his innocence in court. In an unprecedented case, on 30 December 2010, Katsav was convicted of two counts of rape, obstruction of justice, and other charges. On 22 March 2011, in a landmark ruling, Katsav was sentenced to seven years in prison. Katsav appealed his conviction to the Supreme Court of Israel. On 10 November 2011, the Supreme Court affirmed Katsav's conviction and punishment.

On 7 December 2011, Katsav arrived at Maasiyahu Prison in Ramla to begin serving his seven-year sentence. He was released under restrictive conditions on 21 December 2016, having served five years of his sentence.

== Early life ==
Moshe Katsav was born Musa Qassab (Persian: موسى قصاب) in Yazd, Iran, to Persian Jewish parents, Shmuel and Gohar (née Alon) Qassab. His family moved to Tehran when he was a baby, and they emigrated to Israel in 1951. They lived in a tent camp for recent immigrants for several years before the area was developed into the city of Kiryat Malakhi.

After finishing high school, Katsav was drafted into the Israel Defense Forces in 1964, serving in the C4I Corps. He then studied at the Hebrew University of Jerusalem and graduated with a Bachelor of Arts in economics and history in 1971. He married Gila Katsav in 1969. They have five children and two grandchildren.

His mother Gohar died in December 2024 at the age of 95, a matter of hours after his uncle, her brother Yosef Alon died at the age of 93. His uncle was buried in Jerusalem while his mother was buried in Kiryat Malachi.

== Political career ==
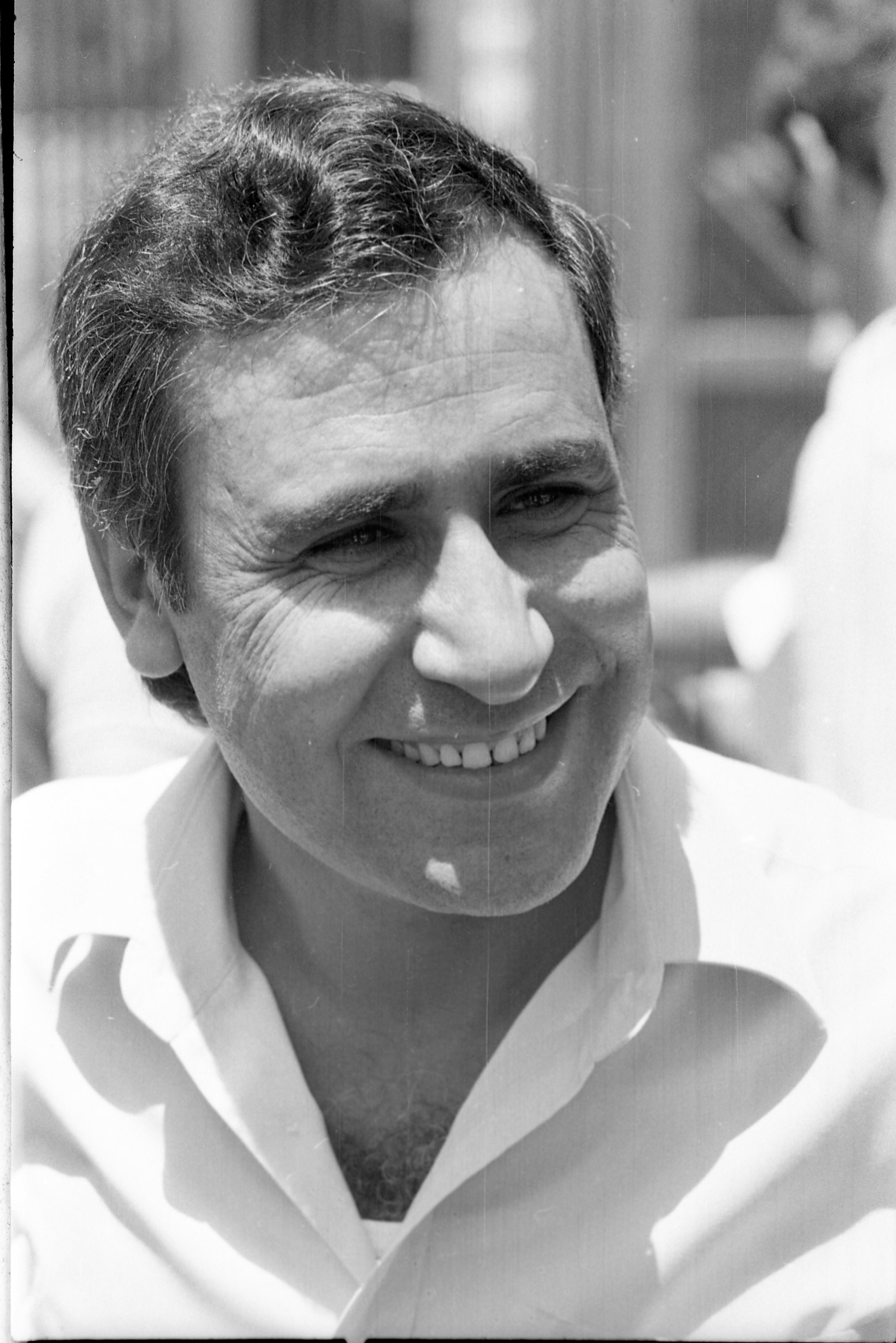
Katsav in 1984.

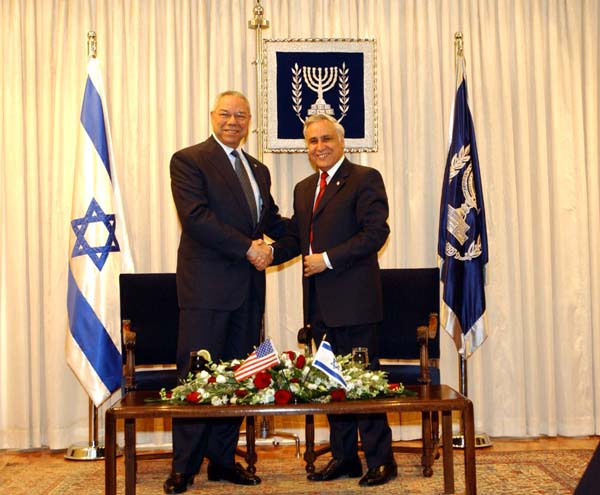
Moshe Katsav with Colin Powell, 2003

Katsav joined the Likud Party and was elected mayor of his hometown of Kiryat Malakhi in 1969. He was elected to the Knesset in 1977.

=== Cabinet minister ===
Katsav was deputy Minister of Construction and Housing from 1981 to 1983 and Minister of Labor and Welfare from 1984 to 1988. He was Transportation Minister from 1988 to 1992 and Deputy Prime Minister and Minister of Tourism from 1996 to 1999.

Katsav was an unsuccessful candidate in the 1993 Likud leadership election.

The public positions filled by Katsav include the following: Chairman of the Iranian Immigrants Organization; Chairman of the commission to determine higher education tuition; and Member of Ben-Gurion University Board of Trustees.

=== Presidency ===
After serving as Deputy Prime Minister in Netanyahu's government, Katsav vied for the position of President, running as the opposition candidate against Shimon Peres. In a surprising upset, he defeated Peres to become the president of Israel, being elected by the Knesset on 31 July 2000. He took 63 votes (over 57 for Peres), two more than the required majority of 61, and was sworn in on 1 August. He was the first President of Israel to have been sworn in for a seven-year term and the first Likud member to win the office. Katsav's victory was attributed in part to evidence that Peres planned to use the position to support the increasingly unpopular peace processes of the government of Ehud Barak.

The office of the Israeli President is largely ceremonial, with no executive powers save pardoning prisoners and commuting sentences. Nevertheless, each president emphasizes different aspects of their role during his tenure. In 2003, on a visit to Italy, he demanded that the Vatican restore treasures allegedly brought to Rome after the fall of Jerusalem in 70 AD.

On 8 April 2005, the alphabetic ordering of leaders during the funeral of Pope John Paul II resulted in Katsav sitting near Iranian President Mohammad Khatami who, like Katsav, was born in the Iranian province of Yazd. Katsav told the press that he shook Khatami's hand and spoke to him in Persian. Khatami later denied this.

== Rape and sexual harassment case ==
In July 2006, Katsav complained to the Attorney General of Israel, Menachem Mazuz, that a female employee was blackmailing him. The investigation quickly turned against Katsav as the employee, referred to as A. (later identified as Orly Revivo), alleged sexual offenses. A, who worked with Katsav when he was Minister of Tourism, claimed that Katsav raped her twice and sexually harassed her in various other ways. Katsav was accused of raping and sexually harassing up to ten women. Police raided his house and seized computers and documents on 22 August. There were calls for him to resign or suspend himself from the presidency. Katsav was questioned under caution on 23 August.

On 7 September, receiving complaints from at least four different women (according to IBA's correspondent for police affairs), the Israel Police determined that they had enough evidence for an indictment. Amid this news breaking, Katsav did not attend the ceremonial swearing-in Dorit Beinisch as President of the Israeli Supreme Court. On 13 September, the Knesset House Committee approved Katsav's request for leave of absence. The ceremony, normally held at the president's house, was moved to the Knesset. Police said that seven women had testified against Katsav and the allegations included "breach of trust, fraud, and involvement in illegal wiretapping." On 18 September, Attorney-General Mazuz stated that the likelihood of Katsav being the victim of a plot was "fairly slim." By 21 September, the number of complaints rose to eight. On 15 October 2006, police said the complaints of five of the women would not be pursued because the statute of limitations had run out. On 29 October, Attorney-General Menachem Mazuz advised Katsav to step down. While denying the allegations, he said he would resign if indicted.

On 23 January 2007, Attorney-General Mazuz announced that he would consider charging Katsav with rape, sexual harassment, breach of trust, obstruction of justice, harassment of a witness and fraud. The president is immune from prosecution while in office and could only be tried after the end of his term in August 2007 or after his resignation. The final decision on indictment would be made after a hearing where Katsav could present his case.

On 24 January 2007, Katsav held a press conference where he accused journalists of persecuting and judging him before all the evidence was in. He claimed that the media were hostile to his presidency from the start. He accused Channel 2 of conducting a witch-hunt. Katsav declared his intention to suspend himself temporarily but refused to step down unless indicted. The speech drew shock and condemnation from journalists, politicians, and legal figures. In a talk scheduled minutes after Katsav's speech, Prime Minister Ehud Olmert called on him to resign from the presidency.

Katsav took a three-month leave of absence approved by the Knesset on 25 January. Knesset Speaker Dalia Itzik assumed the office of president in the interim in a "caretaker" capacity. On 7 March 2007, an attempt to impeach Katsav failed.

On 28 June 2007, Katsav's lawyers reached a plea bargain in which Katsav would plead guilty to several counts of sexual harassment and indecent acts and receive a suspended jail sentence. He would pay compensation to two of the victims. The rape charges brought by A. would be dropped, as well as Katsav's charges of blackmail. This led to a public outcry, particularly from women's rights organizations. Opinion polls showed that 70 percent of the public objected to the deal. The Attorney-General defended the agreement as sparing the presidency from humiliation. Katsav's attorneys claimed that they had agreed to the plea deal in order avoid an arduous trial. By terms of his plea bargain, Katsav resigned from office effective on 1 July 2007 (his seven-year term was scheduled to run out constitutionally on 15 July 2007).

=== Trial ===
On 30 October 2007, the state prosecutor told the High Court of Justice that it had changed its mind about the indictment based on evidence from the two key complainants. The prosecution cited a meeting with Katsav's attorneys that highlighted contradictions in their testimony, including an affectionate letter from one of the complainants after the two rapes allegedly occurred. The move garnered harsh criticism from the complainants' attorneys. Katsav called off the plea bargain in April 2008. According to one of his lawyers, Avigdor Feldman, he believed the prosecution did not have enough evidence to convict him.

In March 2009, Katsav was formally indicted for rape and other sexual offenses in the Tel Aviv District Court. His trial took place between August 2009 and June 2010 before a panel of three judges. Katsav's testimony began in January 2010.

Without forensic evidence, prosecutors built their case almost entirely on witness testimony. According to legal experts, the similarities in the testimonies of the victims, who could not have known one another, would be instrumental in his conviction.

=== Conviction ===
On 30 December 2010, the three judges unanimously found Katsav guilty of "rape, sexual harassment, committing an indecent act while using force, harassing a witness and obstruction of justice". Presiding Judge Karra read the verdict which stated that Katsav "engaged in a campaign of vilification against the plaintiffs." Katsav faced a maximum sentence of 49 years. Prime Minister Benjamin Netanyahu said that it was "a sad day for Israel", but that the verdict shows that in Israel "all are equal before the law, and that every woman has exclusive rights to her body." The conviction was described as "landmark" and "unprecedented", and the story featured prominently in the international media. The sentencing phase began on 22 February 2011.

On 22 March 2011, Moshe Katsav was sentenced to seven years in prison and two years' probation for rape, indecent acts, sexual harassment and obstruction of justice, becoming the first former President of Israel to be sentenced to prison. In addition, he was ordered to pay one of the women compensation totaling 100,000 NIS and another a sum of 25,000 NIS. Katsav's lawyer Zion Amir told reporters that the sentence would be appealed to the Supreme Court of Israel.

Katsav arrived at Maasiyahu Prison in Ramla at 10:08 a.m. on 7 December 2011 to begin serving his sentence. Before departing for prison, he addressed journalists outside his home and maintained his innocence. Dozens of police officers were deployed to the prison to maintain order, and there was a large domestic and foreign media presence. Prison authorities determined that Katsav did not pose a suicide risk, and it was decided that the cameras in his cell would only be activated when his cellmate was absent.

On 18 December 2016, the parole board granted Katsav early release, announcing that he had expressed regret for his actions before it, even though he had failed to do so publicly. The parole board delayed his release for a week, allowing prosecutors to consider whether to appeal. On 21 December 2016, Katsav was released from prison after the State Attorney decided not to appeal the Parole Board's decision for early release.

Katsav served a total of 5 years and 15 days of his 7-year sentence. The Prisoner Rehabilitation Authority imposed parole restrictions to be followed for the remainder of his 7-year sentence. Under the terms of his parole, he was prohibited from making any statements to the media or leaving the country. He was required to attend rehabilitation and visit a psychologist once a week, attend daily Torah study sessions, and remain at his home under a curfew from 10 PM to 6 AM. He was also forbidden from discussing or defaming his victims or holding any position where women are his subordinates.

== See also ==
- Iranian Jews in Israel
- Yazd
- Shaul Mofaz
- List of Israeli public officials convicted of crimes or misdemeanors
- Iran-Israel relations

Political offices
Preceded by Aharon Uzan	Minister of Labor and Social Welfare; 1984–1988	Succeeded by Yitzhak Shamir
Preceded by Haim Corfo	Minister of Transportation; 1988–1992	Succeeded by Yisrael Kessar
Preceded by Uzi Baram	Minister of Tourism; 1996–1999	Succeeded by Ehud Barak
Preceded by Ezer Weizman	President of Israel; 2000–2007	Succeeded by Shimon Peres
