= Yaakov Abuhatzeira =

Moroccan rabbi (1806–1880)

Rabbi Yaakov Abuhatzeira
- יעקב אבוחצירא
- Title: Abhir Yaakov; Abu Hasira

Personal life
- Born: 1806 Tafilalt, Morocco
- Died: January 4, 1880 (aged 74) Damanhour, Egypt

Religious life
- Religion: Judaism

Rabbi Yaakov Abuhatzeira (Hebrew: יעקב אבוחצירא) also known as the Abir Yaakov and Abu Hasira (1806–1880), was a leading Moroccan-Jewish rabbi of the 19th century.

== Biography ==
In 1879, Abuhatzeira left his native Morocco and embarked on a pilgrimage to the Holy Land via Algeria, Tunisia, and Libya. While passing through the Egyptian Nile Delta city of Damanhour, he grew ill and died. He was buried in Damanhour, where his tomb has become a site of pilgrimage to this day.

== Pilgrimage ==
Every year on the 19th of Tevet a ceremony is held at his tomb in Egypt, often attended by hundreds of devotees, many travelling from Israel. The tomb is an official antiquity site protected by the government of Egypt. Some Egyptians have protested against permitting Israeli pilgrims to enter Egypt to make the annual pilgrimage to Rabbi Abuhatzeira's tomb. In 2012, the Egyptian foreign ministry told Israel that it would not be "appropriate" for Israeli pilgrims to make an annual visit to the tomb of Rabbi Abuhatzeira. Gamal Heshmat of the Muslim Brotherhood said that activists planned to stage sit-ins and other protests to block the route to pilgrims. Activists are against "normalization" of relations with Israel. An Egyptian court permanently banned a Jewish celebration that has taken place since the 1979 peace deal with Israel and asked the government to remove the tomb from a list of official shrines, judicial sources said on 29 December 2014. The court said its decision was due to "moral offenses" committed in previous years at the three-day festival celebrating the birth of Rabbi Jacob Abu Hasira. It did not elaborate on what the offenses were.

== Descendants ==
He is the grandfather of Rabbi Yisrael Abuhatzeira, also known as the Baba Sali, a rabbi and kabbalist whose tomb in Netivot is one of the most popular pilgrimage sites in Israel.
