= Baba Sali =

Jewish rabbi and mystic

Rabbi Yisrael Abuhatzeira
- יִשְׂרָאֵל אַבּוּחַצִירָא
- Title: Baba Sali

Personal life
- Born: Yisrael Abuhatzeira; 26 September 1889 Rissani, Morocco
- Died: 8 January 1984 (aged 94) Netivot, Israel
- Buried: Netivot; 31.4302778°N 034.5852778°E
- Spouse: Precha Amsalem; Miriam Abuhatzeira; Simi Abuhatzeira
- Parent: Rabbi Mas'ud Abuhatzeira

Religious life
- Religion: Judaism

Jewish leader
- Successor: Baba Baruch
- Position: Rabbi

Yisrael Abuhatzeira (Hebrew: יִשְׂרָאֵל אַבּוּחַצִירָא; 26 September 1889 – 8 January 1984), known as the Baba Sali (Hebrew: בַּאבָּא סָאלִי; Arabic: بابا صالي; lit. 'Praying Father'), was a leading Moroccan Sephardic rabbi and kabbalist who was renowned for his ability to work miracles through his prayers. His burial place in Netivot, Israel has become a shrine for prayers and petitioners.

== Early life and family ==
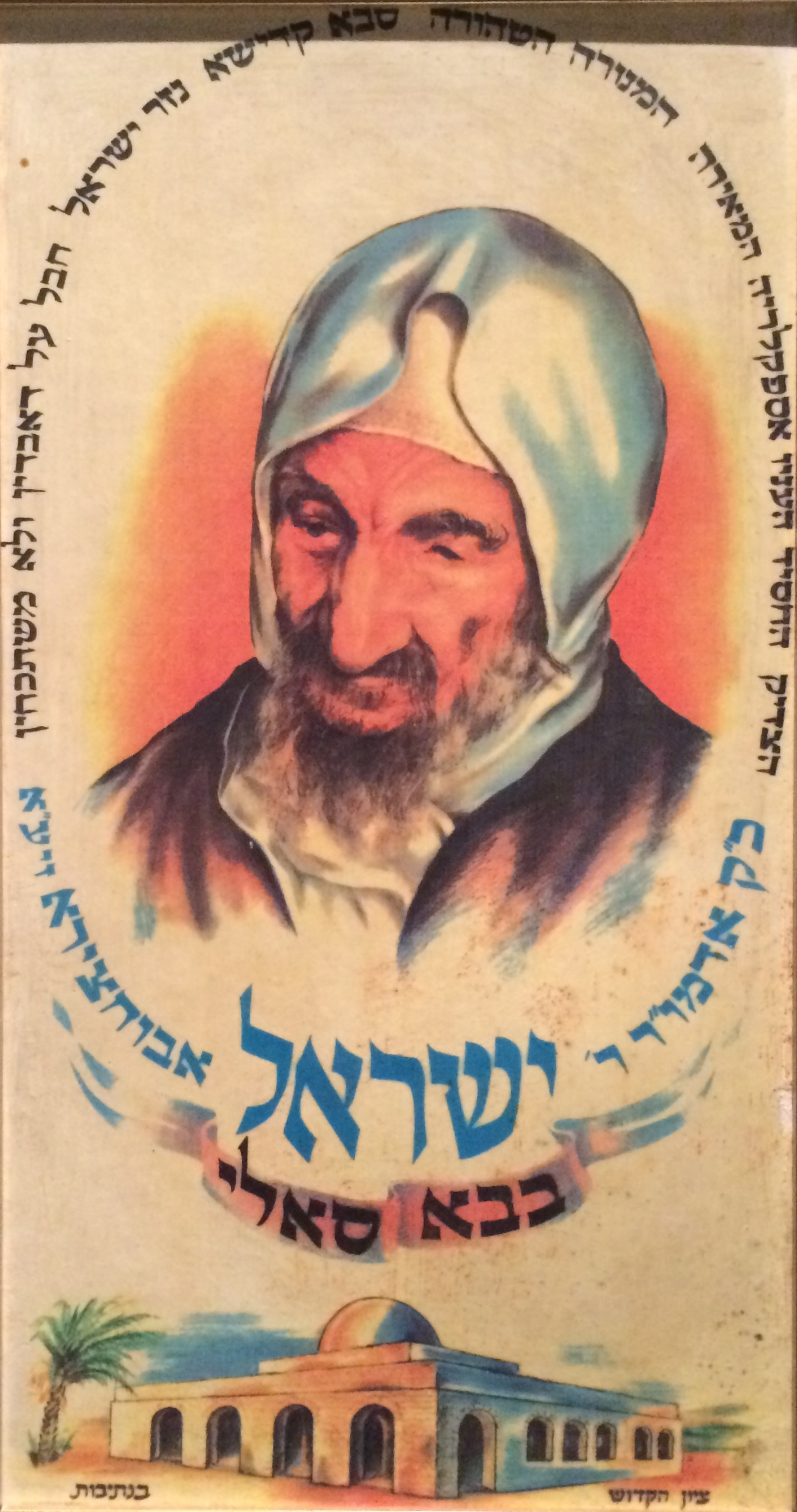
Poster of Baba Sali - Museum of Jewish Art and History

Yisrael Abuhatzeira was born on Rosh Hashanah 5650 (1889). He was the scion of the distinguished Abu Hasira/Abuhatzeira family of Sephardic Torah scholars and tzadikim who were also known as baalei mofet (miracle workers). He is the grandson of Yaakov Abuhatzeira. The patriarch of this family was Shmuel Elbaz. Born in the Land of Israel, Shmuel lived in Damascus for a while, where he studied Torah together with Chaim Vital. In Shem Hagedolim, Chaim Joseph David Azulai described Shmuel as "an ish Elohim kadosh (a holy man of God). Wise people speak of his might and wonders in saving the Jewish community from many difficulties."

Shmuel's descendants eventually moved to the city of Rissani, Morocco, where Shmuel's descendent Mas'ud became the rabbi of the city. Mas'ud's son, Yaakov, known as the Abir Yaakov, succeeded his father as rabbi of Rissani. Yaakov's eldest son, Mas'ud, became an av beit din in the same city, and it was here that his son, Yisrael, was born.

Abuhatzeira's family lived on a large estate which included a yeshiva where young scholars studied night and day. The beit din (rabbinical court) of his father, Mas'ud, was also located on the premises. His older brother, David, studied by himself in an attic. On the rare times that Mas'ud traveled, he would cover his eyes with his cape to avoid seeing inappropriate sights.

As a child, Abuhatzeira was a diligent Torah scholar, studying day and night. At the age of 12, he began to fast during the six weeks of Shovavim. Knowing his parents would not let him continue, he hid his fasting from them, but his brother, David, noticed how weak and pale he was. Though David urged him to stop, Yisrael continued his fasting.

After his bar mitzvah, he entered his family's yeshiva, where the students rose at midnight for Tikkun Chatzot and then studied Kabbalistic works until dawn, when they would go to the mikveh, pray the morning service, and eat breakfast. This was followed by in-depth gemara study, the afternoon prayers, and a shiur in Shulchan Aruch.

== Later years ==
In 1951, Abuhatzeira immigrated to Israel and settled in Lod where he tried to conceal himself from the public. However, he was soon discovered and offered the position of Chief Rabbi of Lod, which he declined. He then moved to Baka, Jerusalem where he managed to keep a low profile for a while, without his neighbors even knowing who he was. Again, he was eventually "discovered" and after the death of Chief Rabbi of Israel, Ben-Zion Meir Hai Uziel in 1953, he was offered the position, which he also turned down.

Several years after his arrival in Israel, the news reached Abuhatzeira that Jewish life in Morocco had spiritually deteriorated greatly, so he returned to his country of birth to lead and inspire the community there. In 1964, he returned to Israel again and soon settled in Netivot, a city in the Negev. He received visitors from all over, asking him for blessings and advice.

== Funeral and tomb ==
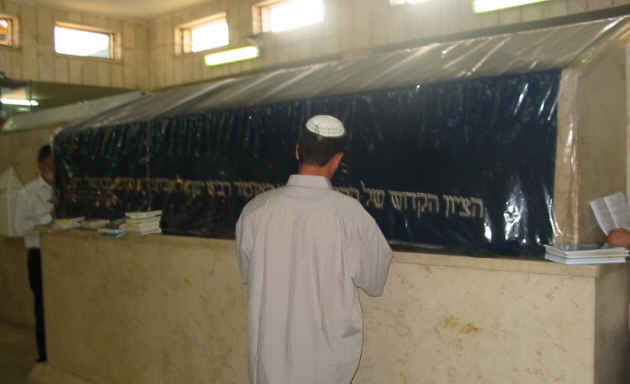
Grave of the Baba Sali

Abuhatzeira died on 8 January 1984 (4 Shevat 5744). His funeral was attended by an estimated 100,000 people. His gravesite in Netivot has become a popular pilgrimage site in Israel. On the anniversary of his death, thousands come to visit his tomb and pray.
