= Gidi =

Gidi may refer to:

== People ==
- Gidi Avivi (born 1961), Israeli film producer
- Gidi Damti (born 1951), Israeli football manager and player
- Gidi Gov (born 1950), Israeli singer, TV host, entertainer, and actor
- Gidi Grinstein, Israeli societal entrepreneur
- Gidi Jacobs (1935–2016), Dutch football player and manager
- Gidi Kanyuk (born 1993), Israeli football player
- Gidi Markuszower (born 1977), Israeli–Dutch politician
- Samuel Gidi (born 2004), Slovak football player

== Places ==
- Gidi, Hazaribagh, India
- Gidi Pass, Egypt
- Las Gidi, Nigeria

== Other ==
- Gidi Culture Festival

== See also ==
- Gidy
