= Six-Day War =

1967 war between Israel and Arab states

- Part of the Arab–Israeli conflict and the Cold War
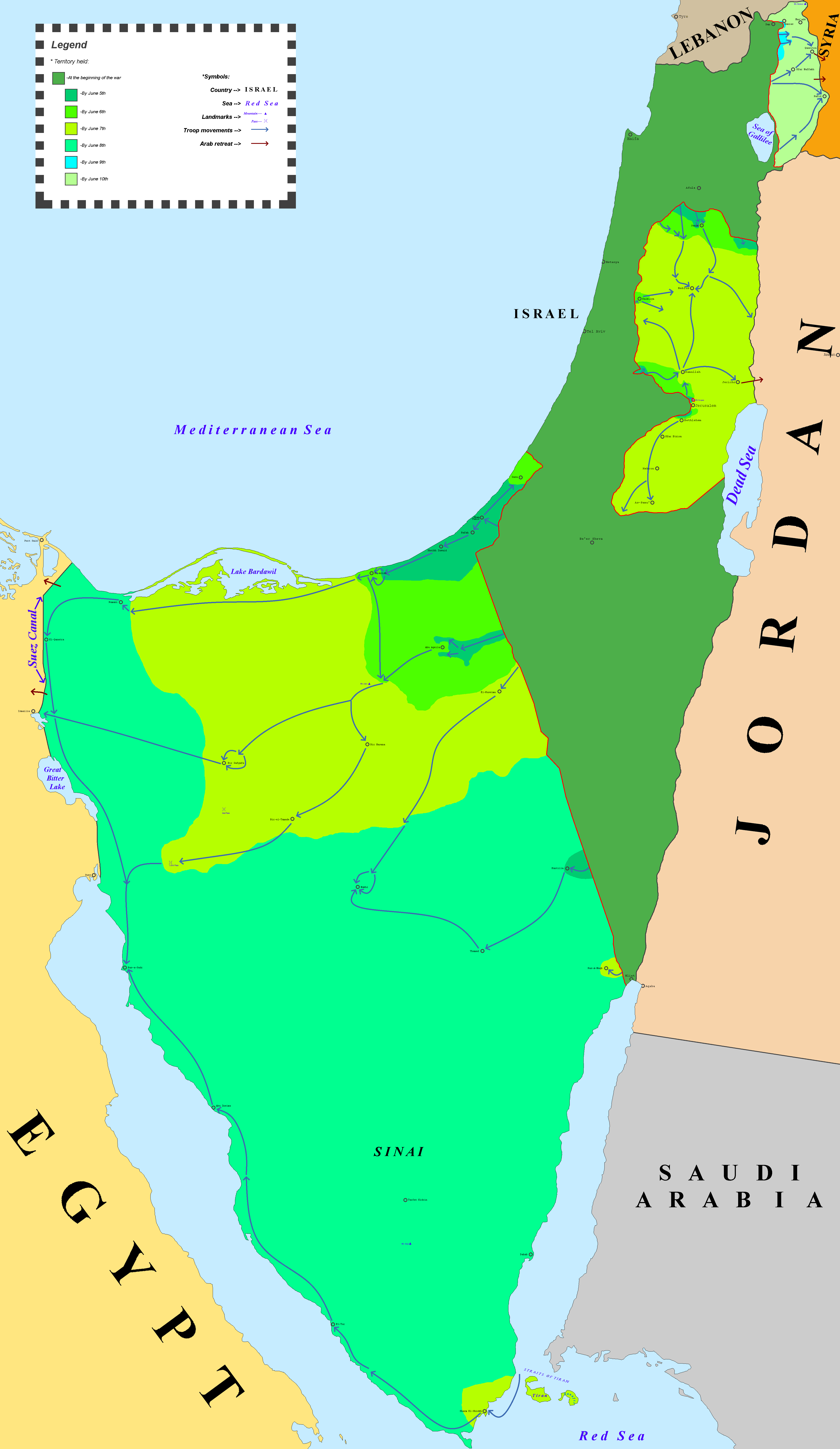
- A map of military movements during the conflict. Israel proper is shown in dark green and territories occupied by Israel are shown in various shades of green
Date	5–10 June 1967 (6 days)
Location	Middle East
Result	Israeli victory
Territorial changes	Israel occupies a total of 70,000 km^{2} (27,000 sq mi) of territory: The Golan Heights from Syria; The West Bank including East Jerusalem from Jordan; The Gaza Strip and the Sinai Peninsula from Egypt

Belligerents
Israel	Egypt; Syria; Jordan; Iraq; Minor involvement: Lebanon

Commanders and leaders
Levi Eshkol; Moshe Dayan; Yitzhak Rabin; David Elazar; Uzi Narkiss; Israel Tal	Gamal Abdel Nasser; Abdel Hakim Amer; Abdul Munim Riad; King Hussein; Abdul Rahman Arif

Strength
Israel: 264,000 total; 250–300 combat aircraft; 800 tanks	Egypt: 160,000 total; 100,000 deployed; 419–420 aircraft; 900–950 tanks; Syria: 75,000 troops; Jordan: 55,000 total; 45,000 deployed; 270 tanks; Iraq: 100 tanks; Lebanon: 2 combat aircraft; Total: 465,000 soldiers; 800 aircraft; 2,504 tanks

Casualties and losses
Israel: 776–983 killed; 4,517 wounded; 15 captured; 100–400 tanks destroyed; 36–48 aircraft destroyed	Egypt: 9,800–15,000 killed or missing; 4,338 captured; Syria: 1,000–2,500 killed; 367–591 captured; Jordan: 696–700 killed; 2,500 wounded; 533 captured; 509–700 or more tanks destroyed; 372–440 aircraft destroyed
- 15 UN peacekeepers killed and 17 injured; 20 Israeli civilians killed and 1,000+ Israeli civilians injured in Jerusalem; 34 US Navy, Marine, and NSA personnel killed; 17 Soviet Marines killed (disputed); 413,000 Palestinians displaced

The Six-Day War, (Note: Hebrew: מִלְחֶמֶת שֵׁשֶׁת הַיָּמִים, romanized: Milḥemet Šešet HaYamim; Arabic: النكسة, romanized: an-Naksah, lit. 'The Setback' or حرب 1967, Ḥarb 1967, 'War of 1967', also known as the June war or third Arab–Israeli war) or the 1967 Arab–Israeli war (5–10 June 1967), was fought between Israel and a coalition of six Arab states, primarily Egypt, Syria, and Jordan, in the context of the Arab–Israeli conflict. The war, in which Israel conquered and occupied the Sinai Peninsula, the Gaza Strip, the West Bank of the Jordan River, East Jerusalem, and the Golan Heights, shaped the political and strategic landscape of the Middle East into the 21st century. Many of the war's consequences remain unresolved.

The war broke out amid continual armed border incidents as well as rising Pan-Arab Nationalism, which aimed to unite Arab nations around opposition to Israel. In April 1967, a border incident between Israel and Syria, led to an aerial engagement in which six Syrian jets were shot down. This led to false reports by the Soviet Union that Israel intended to launch a major ground attack upon Syria.

In mid May, Egyptian President Gamal Abdel Nasser mobilized 100,000 Egyptian troops to the border with Israel and ordered the immediate withdrawal of all UN peacekeepers from the region. Eight days later, Nassar announced that the Straits of Tiran, Israel’s only access to the Red Sea, would be closed to Israeli vessels. Israel had already stated that closure of the straits would be considered an act of war.

On 26 May, Nassar explained that the blockade meant "confrontation with Israel (and) also meant that we were ready to enter a general war with Israel. The battle will be a general one and our basic objective will be to destroy Israel".

On 30 May, Egypt signed a defense pact with Jordan, a pact with Syria having been concluded the previous November. The following day, at Jordan's invitation, the Iraqi army began deploying troops and armored units in Jordan.

On 1 June, Israel formed a National Unity Government by widening its cabinet, and on 4 June the decision was made to go to war. The war began on 5 June 1967 with Operation Focus, an Israeli surprise attack consisting of a series of airstrikes against Egyptian airfields and other facilities as the UNEF was leaving the zone. Israel caught Egyptian forces by surprise and destroyed nearly all of Egypt's air force, giving Israel air supremacy.

Simultaneously, the Israeli military launched a ground offensive into Egypt's Sinai Peninsula and the Egyptian-occupied Gaza Strip. Jordan joined the offensive later that morning, with an attack on West Jerusalem. After some initial resistance, Nasser ordered an evacuation of the Sinai Peninsula; by the fourth day of the conflict, Israel had occupied the entire Sinai Peninsula. On the fifth day, Syria joined the war by shelling Israeli positions in the north. By Saturday, Israeli forces occupied the Golan, and stabilized a position overlooking the Damascus Plain.

Egypt and Jordan agreed to a ceasefire on 8 June, and Syria on 10 June, and it was signed with Israel on 11 June. The Six-Day War resulted in more than 15,000 Arab fatalities, and fewer than 1,000 Israeli. Alongside the combatant casualties were the deaths of 20 Israeli civilians killed in Arab forces air strikes on Jerusalem, 15 UN peacekeepers killed by Israeli strikes in the Sinai at the outset of the war, and 34 US personnel killed in the USS Liberty incident, in which Israeli air and naval forces mistakenly assaulted a United States Navy spy ship.

When hostilities ceased, Israel had occupied the Golan Heights from Syria, the West Bank including East Jerusalem from Jordan, and the Sinai Peninsula and the Gaza Strip from Egypt. The displacement of civilian populations as a result of the Six-Day War had long-term consequences, as around 280,000 to 325,000 Palestinians and 100,000 Syrians fled or were expelled from the West Bank and the Golan Heights, respectively. Nasser resigned in shame after Israel's victory, but was reinstated after a series of protests across Egypt. In the aftermath of the conflict, Egypt closed the Suez Canal from 1967 to 1975.

== Background ==
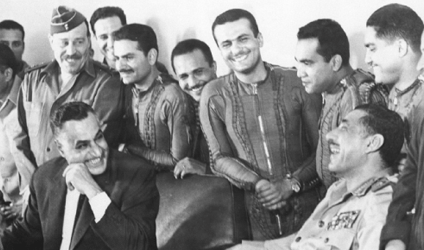
On 22 May 1967, President Nasser addressed his pilots at Bir Gifgafa Airfield in Sinai: "Under no circumstances we will permit the Israeli flag to pass through the Bay of Aqaba"

After the 1956 Suez Crisis, Egypt agreed to the stationing of a United Nations Emergency Force (UNEF) in the Sinai to ensure all parties would comply with the 1949 Armistice Agreements. In the following years, there were numerous minor border clashes between Israel and its Arab neighbors, particularly Syria. In early November 1966, Syrian president Nureddin al-Atassi signed a mutual defense agreement with Egypt. Soon thereafter, in response to Palestine Liberation Organization (PLO) guerilla activity, including a mine attack that left three dead, the Israeli Defense Force (IDF) attacked the village of as-Samu in the Jordanian-ruled West Bank. Jordanian units that engaged the Israelis were quickly beaten back. King Hussein of Jordan criticized Egyptian President Gamal Abdel Nasser for failing to come to Jordan's aid and "hiding behind UNEF skirts".

In May 1967, Nasser received false reports from the Soviet Union that Israel was massing on the Syrian border. Nasser began massing his troops in two defensive lines in the Sinai Peninsula on Israel's border (16 May), expelled the UNEF force from Gaza and Sinai (19 May), and took over UNEF positions at Sharm el-Sheikh, overlooking the Straits of Tiran. Israel repeated declarations it had made in 1957 that any closure of the Straits would be considered an act of war or justification for war, but on 22-23 May, Nasser ordered the Straits to be closed to Israeli shipping. After the war, U.S. President Lyndon B. Johnson said:

If a single act of folly was more responsible for this explosion than any other, it was the arbitrary and dangerous announced decision that the Straits of Tiran would be closed. The right of innocent, maritime passage must be preserved for all nations.

On 30 May, Jordan and Egypt signed a defense pact. On 31 May, having earlier declined Hussein's invitation to send troops to Jordan, Iraqi president Abdul Rahman Arif agreed to deploy troops and armored units in Jordan to confront Israel. They were later reinforced by an Egyptian contingent. On 1 June, Israel formed a National Unity Government by widening its cabinet, and on 4 June the decision was made to go to war. The next morning, Israel launched Operation Focus, the surprise air strike that launched the war.

=== Military preparation ===
Before the war, Israeli pilots and ground crews had trained extensively in rapid refitting of aircraft returning from sorties, enabling a single aircraft to sortie up to four times a day, as opposed to the norm in Arab air forces of one or two. This enabled the Israeli Air Force (IAF) to send several attack waves against Egyptian airfields on the war's first day, overwhelming the Egyptian Air Force and allowing the IAF to knock out other Arab air forces the same day. Pilots were extensively schooled about their targets, memorized layouts in detail, and rehearsed the operation multiple times on dummy runways in total secrecy.

The Egyptians had constructed fortified defenses in the Sinai. These designs were based on the assumption that an attack would come along the few roads leading through the desert rather than through the difficult desert terrain. The Israelis chose not to risk attacking the Egyptian defenses head-on, instead surprising them from an unexpected direction.

James Reston wrote in The New York Times on 23 May 1967: "In discipline, training, morale, equipment and general competence his [Nasser's] army and the other Arab forces, without the direct assistance of the Soviet Union, are no match for the Israelis. ... Even with 50,000 troops and the best of his generals and air force in Yemen, he has not been able to work his way in that small and primitive country, and even his effort to help the Congo rebels was a flop."

On the eve of the war, Israel believed it could win a war in 3–4 days. The United States estimated Israel would need 7–10 days, with British estimates supporting the U.S. view.

== Armies and weapons ==
=== Armies ===
The Israeli army had a total strength, including reservists, of 264,000, though this number could not be sustained during a long conflict, as the reservists were vital to civilian life.

Against Jordan's forces on the West Bank, Israel deployed about 40,000 troops and 200 tanks (eight brigades). Israeli Central Command forces consisted of five brigades. The first two were permanently stationed near Jerusalem and were the Jerusalem Brigade and the mechanized Harel Brigade. Mordechai Gur's 55th Paratroopers Brigade was summoned from the Sinai front. The 10th Armored Brigade was stationed north of the West Bank. The Israeli Northern Command comprised a division of three brigades led by Major General Elad Peled which was stationed in the Jezreel Valley to the north of the West Bank.

On the eve of the war, Egypt massed approximately 100,000 of its 160,000 troops in the Sinai, including all seven of its divisions (four infantry, two armored and one mechanized), four independent infantry brigades and four independent armored brigades. Over a third of these soldiers were veterans of Egypt's continuing intervention into the North Yemen Civil War and another third were reservists. These forces had 950 tanks, 1,100 APCs, and more than 1,000 artillery pieces.

Syria's army had a total strength of 75,000 and was deployed along the border with Israel. Professor David W. Lesch wrote that "One would be hard-pressed to find a military less prepared for war with a clearly superior foe" since Syria's army had been decimated in the months and years prior through coups and attempted coups that had resulted in a series of purges, fractures, and uprisings within the armed forces.

The Jordanian Armed Forces included 11 brigades, totaling 55,000 troops. Nine brigades (45,000 troops, 270 tanks, 200 artillery pieces) were deployed in the West Bank, including the elite armored 40th, and two in the Jordan Valley. They possessed sizable numbers of M113 APCs and were equipped with some 300 modern Western tanks, 250 of which were U.S. M48 Pattons. They also had 12 battalions of artillery, six batteries of 81 mm and 120 mm mortars, a paratrooper battalion trained in the new U.S.-built school and a new battalion of mechanized infantry. The Jordanian Army was a long-term-service, professional army, relatively well-equipped and well-trained. Israeli post-war briefings said that the Jordanian staff acted professionally but was always left "half a step" behind by the Israeli moves. The small Royal Jordanian Air Force consisted of only 24 British-made Hawker Hunter fighters, six transport aircraft and two helicopters. According to the Israelis, the Hawker Hunter was essentially on par with the French-built Dassault Mirage III – the IAF's best plane.

One hundred Iraqi tanks and an infantry division were readied near the Jordanian border. Two squadrons of Iraqi fighter-aircraft, Hawker Hunters and MiG 21s, were rebased adjacent to the Jordanian border.

In the weeks leading up to the war, Saudi Arabia mobilized forces for deployment to the Jordanian front. A Saudi infantry battalion entered Jordan on 6 June, followed by another on 8 June. Both were based in Jordan's southernmost city, Ma'an. By 17 June, the Saudi contingent in Jordan had grown to include a single infantry brigade, a tank company, two artillery batteries, a heavy mortar company, and a maintenance and support unit. By the end of July, a second tank company and a third artillery battery had been added. These forces remained in Jordan until the end of 1977, when they were recalled for re-equipment and retraining in the Karak region near the Dead Sea.

The Arab air forces were reinforced by aircraft from Libya, Algeria, Morocco, Kuwait, and Saudi Arabia to make up for the massive losses suffered on the first day of the war. They were also aided by volunteer pilots from the Pakistan Air Force acting in an independent capacity. PAF pilots like Saiful Azam shot down several Israeli planes.

=== Weapons ===
Israeli tank M1 Super Sherman in the Sinai in 1967

With the exception of Jordan, the Arabs relied principally on Soviet weaponry. Jordan's army was equipped with American weaponry, and its air force was composed of British aircraft.

Egypt had by far the largest and the most modern of all the Arab air forces, consisting of about 420 combat aircraft, all of them Soviet-built and with a large number of top-of-the-line MiG-21s. Of particular concern to the Israelis were the 30 Tu-16 "Badger" medium bombers, capable of inflicting heavy damage on Israeli military and civilian centers.

Israeli weapons were mainly of Western origin. Its air force was composed principally of French aircraft, while its armored units were mostly of British and American design and manufacture. Some light infantry weapons, including the ubiquitous Uzi, were of Israeli origin.

Type	Arab armies	IDF
AFVs	Egypt, Syria and Iraq used T-34/85, T-54, T-55, PT-76, and SU-100/152 World War II-vintage Soviet self-propelled guns. Jordan used US M47, M48, and M48A1 Patton tanks. Panzer IV, Sturmgeschütz III and Jagdpanzer IV (ex-German vehicles all used by Syria)	M50 and M51 Shermans, M48A3 Patton, Centurion, AMX-13, M32 tank recovery vehicle. The Centurion was upgraded with the British 105 mm L7 gun prior to the war. The Sherman also underwent extensive modifications including a larger 105 mm medium velocity, French gun, redesigned turret, wider tracks, more armor, and upgraded engine and suspension.
APCs/IFVs	BTR-40, BTR-152, BTR-50, BTR-60 APCs	M2, / M3 Half-track, Panhard AML
Artillery	M1937 howitzer, BM-21, D-30 (2A18) howitzer, M1954 field gun, M-52 105 mm self-propelled howitzer (used by Jordan)	M50 self-propelled howitzer and Makmat 160 mm self-propelled mortar, M7 Priest, Obusier de 155 mm Modèle 50, AMX 105 mm self-propelled howitzer
Aircraft	MiG-21, MiG-19, MiG-17, Su-7B, Tu-16, Il-28, Il-18, Il-14, An-12, Hawker Hunter used by Jordan and Iraq	Dassault Mirage III, Dassault Super Mystère, Sud Aviation Vautour, Mystere IV, Dassault Ouragan, Fouga Magister trainer outfitted for attack missions, Nord 2501IS military cargo plane
Helicopters	Mi-6, Mi-4	Super Frelon, Sikorsky S-58
AAW	SA-2 Guideline, ZSU-57-2 mobile anti-aircraft cannon	MIM-23 Hawk, Bofors 40 mm
Infantry weapons	Port Said submachine gun, AK-47, RPK, RPD, DShK HMG, B-10 and B-11 recoilless rifles	Uzi, FN FAL, FN MAG, AK-47, M2 Browning, Cobra, Nord SS.10, Nord SS.11, RL-83 Blindicide anti-tank infantry weapon, Jeep-mounted 106 mm recoilless rifle

==== Nuclear weapons ====
Israel is believed to have begun full-scale production of nuclear weapons following the 1967 Six-Day War, although it had built its first operational nuclear weapon by December 1966. A Central Intelligence Agency (CIA) report from early 1967 stated that Israel had the materials to construct a bomb in six to eight weeks and some authors suggest that Israel had two crude bombs ready for use during the war. According to US journalist Seymour Hersh, everything was ready for production at this time save an official order to do so. Israel crossed the nuclear threshold on the eve of the Six-Day War in May 1967. "[Prime Minister] Eshkol, according to a number of Israeli sources, secretly ordered the Dimona [nuclear reactor] scientists to assemble two crude nuclear devices. He placed them under the command of Brigadier General Yitzhak Yaakov, the chief of research and development in Israel's Defense Ministry. The crude atomic bombs were readied for deployment on trucks that could race to the Egyptian border for detonation in the event Arab forces overwhelmed Israeli defenses." Spider (Hebrew: עכביש) was the name for the devices. The name for the plan was Operation Shimshon (Hebrew: מבצע שמשון), named after the death of Samson in Judges 16:30. It was also referred to as Operation Samson, codename "Samson" (Hebrew: שם הקוד "שמשון"), or (Hebrew: מבצע שמשון, romanized: Mivtza Shimshon). General Yaakov also sometimes called the plan Operation Doomsday. (Hebrew: מבצע יום הדין, romanized: Mivtza Yum Hadin).

== Fighting fronts ==
=== Initial attack ===
Israeli troops examine destroyed Egyptian aircraft

Dassault Mirage III in 1967. Operation Focus was mainly conducted using French built aircraft.

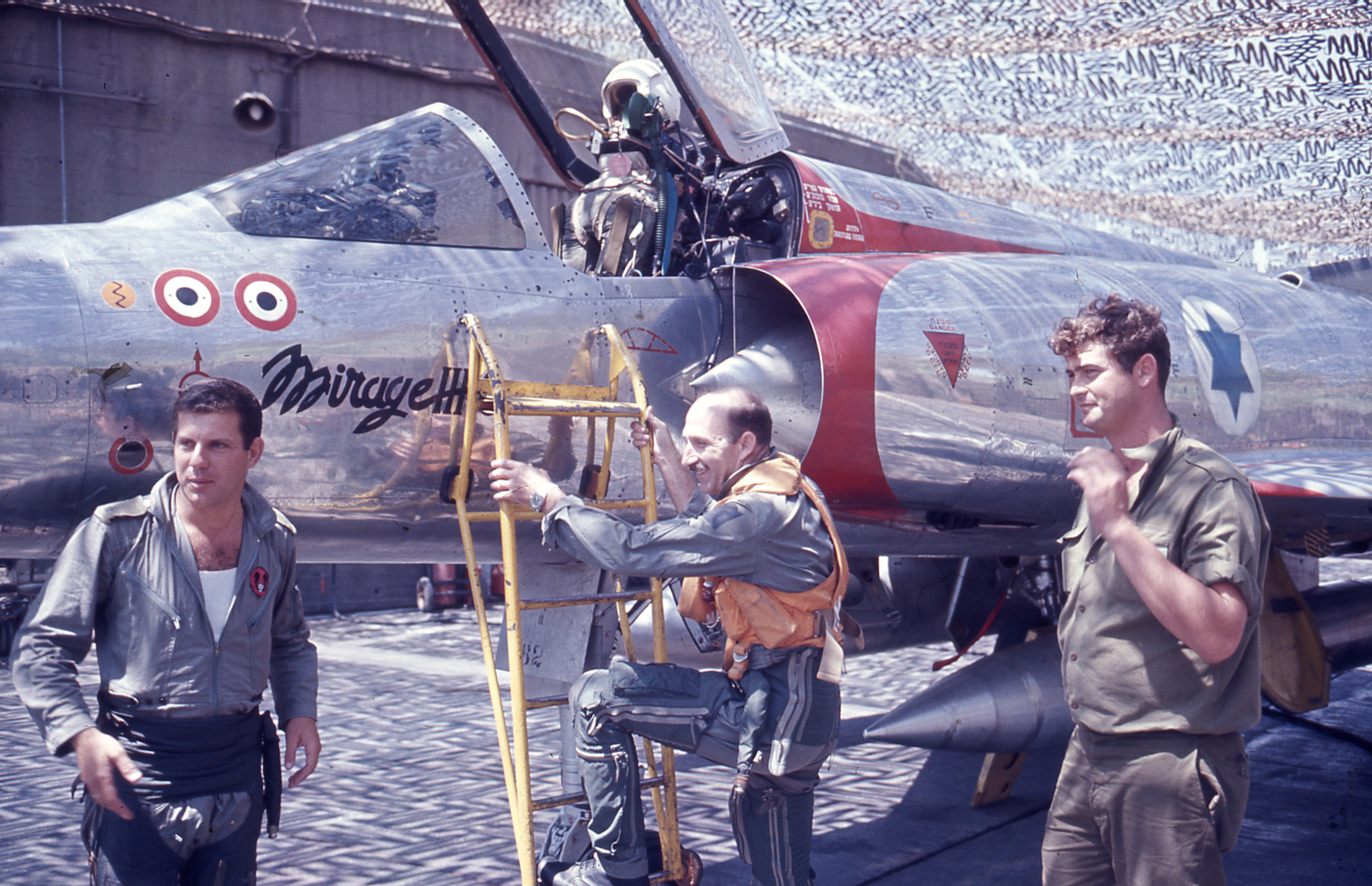
Dassault Mirage III

The first and most critical move of the conflict was a surprise Israeli attack on the Egyptian Air Force. Initially, both Egypt and Israel announced that they had been attacked by the other country.

On 5 June at 7:45 Israeli time, with civil defense sirens sounding all over Israel, the IAF launched Operation Focus (Moked). All but 12 of its nearly 200 operational jets launched a mass attack against Egypt's airfields. The Egyptian defensive infrastructure was extremely poor, and no airfields were yet equipped with hardened aircraft shelters capable of protecting Egypt's warplanes. Most of the Israeli warplanes headed out over the Mediterranean Sea, flying low to avoid radar detection, before turning toward Egypt. Others flew over the Red Sea.

Meanwhile, the Egyptians hindered their own defense by effectively shutting down their entire air defense system: they were worried that rebel Egyptian forces would shoot down the plane carrying Field Marshal Abdel Hakim Amer and Lt-Gen. Sidqi Mahmoud, who were en route from al Maza to Bir Tamada in the Sinai to meet the commanders of the troops stationed there. It did not make a great deal of difference as the Israeli pilots came in below Egyptian radar cover and well below the lowest point at which its SA-2 surface-to-air missile batteries could bring down an aircraft.

Although the powerful Jordanian radar facility at Ajloun detected waves of aircraft approaching Egypt and reported the code word for "war" up the Egyptian command chain, Egyptian command and communications problems prevented the warning from reaching the targeted airfields. The Israelis employed a mixed-attack strategy: bombing and strafing runs against planes parked on the ground, and bombing to disable runways with special tarmac-shredding penetration bombs developed jointly with France, leaving surviving aircraft unable to take off.

The runway at the Arish airfield was spared, as the Israelis expected to turn it into a military airport for their transports after the war. Surviving aircraft were taken out by later attack waves. The operation was more successful than expected, catching the Egyptians by surprise and destroying virtually all of the Egyptian Air Force on the ground, with few Israeli losses. Only four unarmed Egyptian training flights were in the air when the strike began. A total of 338 Egyptian aircraft were destroyed and 100 pilots were killed, although the number of aircraft lost by the Egyptians is disputed.

Among the Egyptian planes lost were all 30 Tu-16 bombers, 27 out of 40 Il-28 bombers, 12 Su-7 fighter-bombers, over 90 MiG-21s, 20 MiG-19s, 25 MiG-17 fighters, and around 32 transport planes and helicopters. In addition, Egyptian radars and SAM missiles were also attacked and destroyed. The Israelis lost 19 planes, including two destroyed in air-to-air combat and 13 downed by anti-aircraft artillery. One Israeli plane, which was damaged and unable to break radio silence, was shot down by Israeli Hawk missiles after it strayed over the Negev Nuclear Research Center. Another was destroyed by an exploding Egyptian bomber.

The attack guaranteed Israeli air supremacy for the rest of the war. Attacks on other Arab air forces by Israel took place later in the day as hostilities broke out on other fronts.

The large numbers of Arab aircraft claimed destroyed by Israel on that day were at first regarded as "greatly exaggerated" by the Western press, but the fact that the Egyptian Air Force, along with other Arab air forces attacked by Israel, made practically no appearance for the remaining days of the conflict proved that the numbers were most likely authentic. Throughout the war, Israeli aircraft continued strafing Arab airfield runways to prevent their return to usability. Meanwhile, Egyptian state-run radio had reported an Egyptian victory, falsely claiming that 70 Israeli planes had been downed on the first day of fighting.

=== Gaza Strip and Sinai Peninsula ===
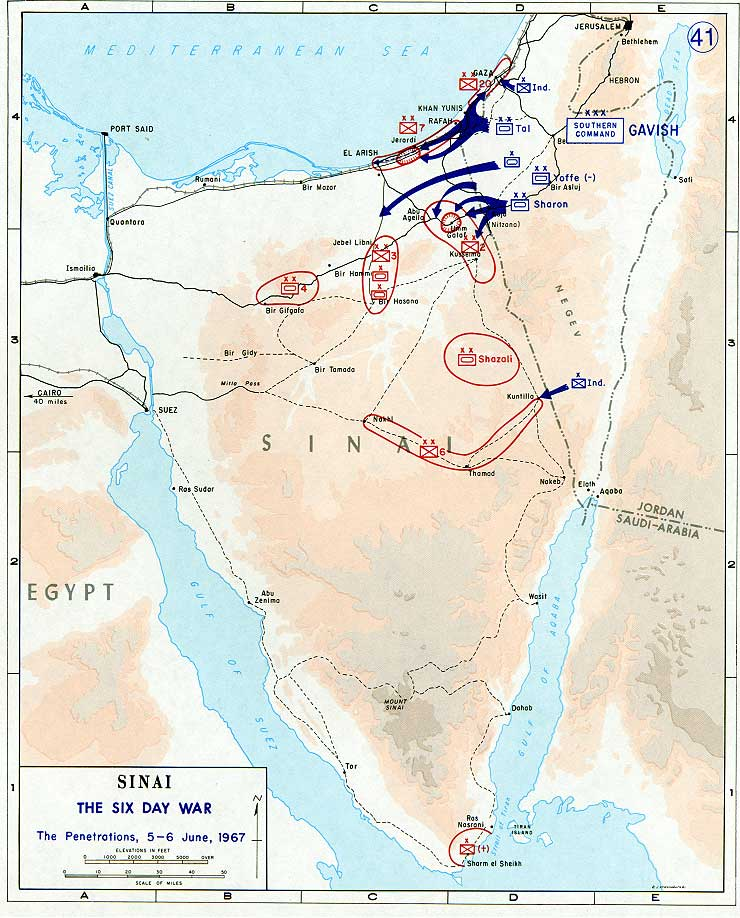
The capture of Sinai. 5–6 June 1967

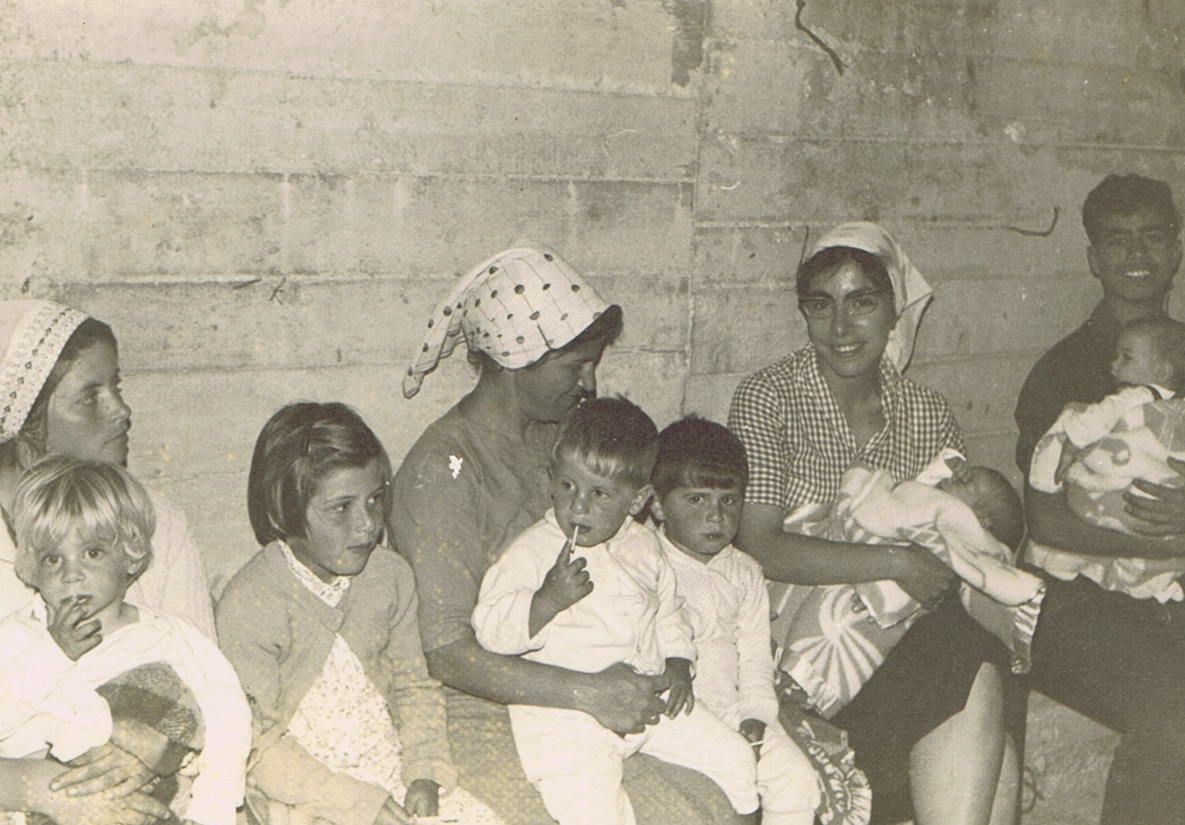
People in a bomb shelter at Kfar Maimon

The Egyptian forces consisted of seven divisions: four armored, two infantry, and one mechanized infantry. Overall, Egypt had around 100,000 troops and 900–950 tanks in the Sinai, backed by 1,100 APCs and 1,000 artillery pieces. This arrangement was thought to be based on the Soviet doctrine, where mobile armor units at strategic depth provide a dynamic defense while infantry units engage in defensive battles.

Israeli forces concentrated on the border with Egypt included six armored brigades, one infantry brigade, one mechanized infantry brigade, three paratrooper brigades, giving a total of around 70,000 men and 700 tanks, who were organized in three armored divisions. They had massed on the border the night before the war, camouflaging themselves and observing radio silence before being ordered to advance.

The Israeli plan was to surprise the Egyptian forces in both timing (the attack exactly coinciding with the IAF strike on Egyptian airfields), and in location (attacking via northern and central Sinai routes, as opposed to the Egyptian expectations of a repeat of the 1956 war, when the IDF attacked via the central and southern routes) and method (using a combined-force flanking approach, rather than direct tank assaults).

==== Northern (El Arish) Israeli division ====
On 5 June, at 7:50 a.m., the northernmost Israeli division, consisting of three brigades and commanded by Major General Israel Tal, one of Israel's most prominent armor commanders, crossed the border at two points, opposite Nahal Oz and south of Khan Yunis. They advanced swiftly, holding their fire to maintain the element of surprise. Tal's forces assaulted the "Rafah Gap", a 7-mile (11 km) stretch containing the shortest of three main routes through the Sinai towards El Qantara and the Suez Canal. The Egyptians had four divisions in the area, backed by minefields, pillboxes, underground bunkers, hidden gun emplacements and trenches. The terrain on either side of the route was impassable. The Israeli plan was to hit the Egyptians at selected key points with concentrated armor.

Tal's advance was led by the 7th Armored Brigade, under Colonel Shmuel Gonen. The Israeli plan called for the 7th Brigade to outflank Khan Yunis from the north and the 60th Armored Brigade, under Colonel Menachem Aviram, to advance from the south. The two brigades would link up and surround Khan Yunis, while the paratroopers would take Rafah. Gonen entrusted the breakthrough to a single battalion of his brigade.

Initially, the advance encountered light resistance, as Egyptian intelligence had concluded that it was a diversion for the main attack. As Gonen's lead battalion advanced, it suddenly came under intense fire and took heavy losses. A second battalion was brought up but was also pinned down. Meanwhile, the 60th Brigade became bogged down in the sand, while the paratroopers had trouble navigating through the dunes. The Israelis continued to press their attack, and despite heavy losses, cleared the Egyptian positions and reached the Khan Yunis railway junction in a little over four hours.

Gonen's brigade then advanced 9 miles (14 km) to Rafah in twin columns. Rafah itself was circumvented, and the Israelis attacked Sheikh Zuweid, 8 miles (13 km) to the southwest, which was defended by two brigades. Though inferior in numbers and equipment, the Egyptians were deeply entrenched and camouflaged. The Israelis were pinned down by fierce Egyptian resistance and called in air and artillery support to enable their lead elements to advance. Many Egyptians abandoned their positions after their commander and several of his staff were killed.

The Israelis broke through with tank-led assaults, but Aviram's forces misjudged the Egyptians' flank and were pinned between strongholds before being extracted after several hours. By nightfall, the Israelis had finished mopping up resistance. The Israelis had taken significant losses, with Colonel Gonen later telling reporters that "we left many of our dead soldiers in Rafah and many burnt-out tanks." The Egyptians suffered some 2,000 casualties and lost 40 tanks.

==== Advance on Arish ====
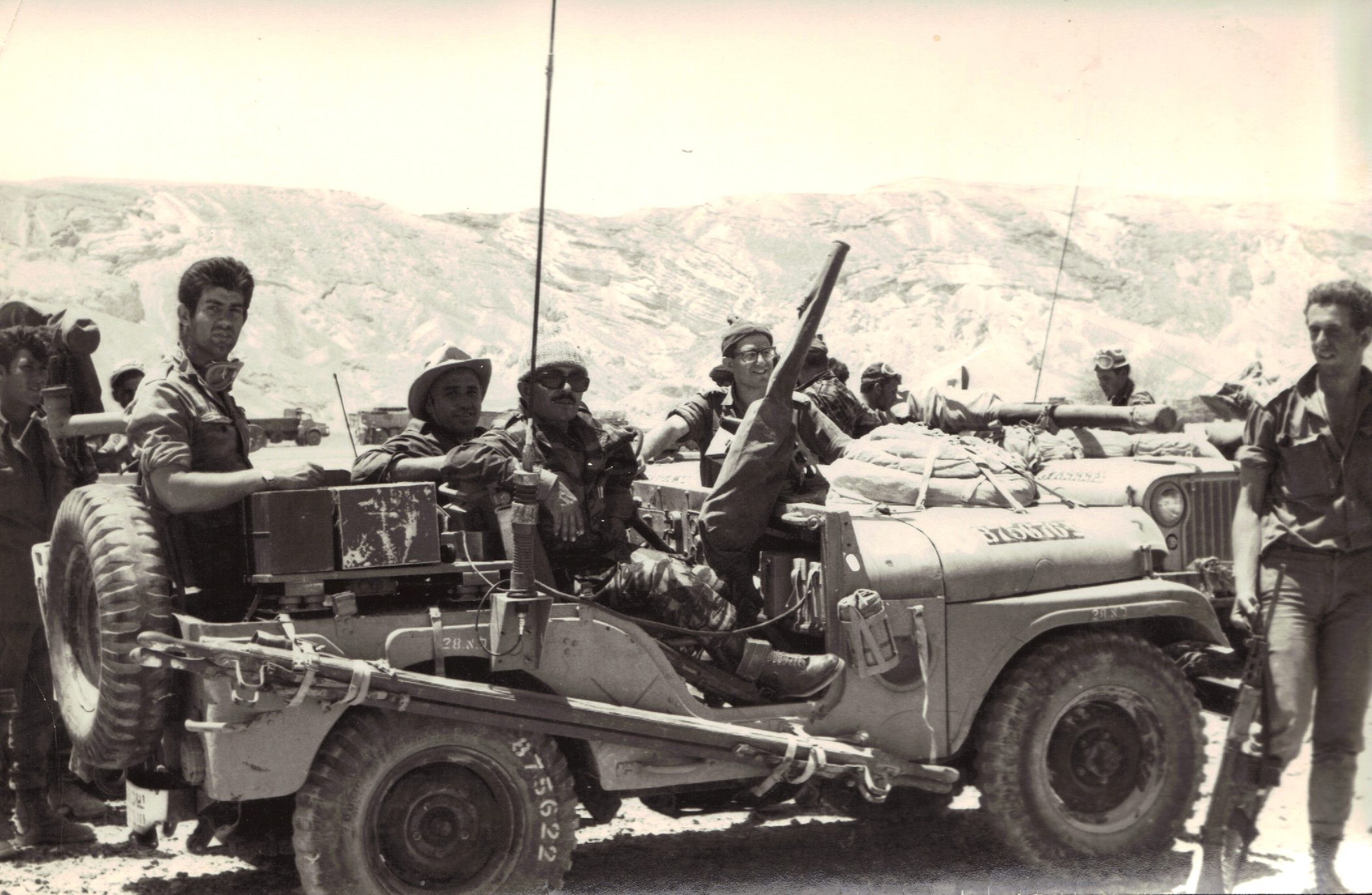
Israeli reconnaissance forces from the "Shaked" unit in Sinai during the war

On 5 June, with the road open, Israeli forces continued advancing towards Arish. Already by late afternoon, elements of the 79th Armored Battalion had charged through the 7-mile-long (11 km) Jiradi defile, a narrow pass defended by well-emplaced troops of the Egyptian 112th Infantry Brigade. In fierce fighting, which saw the pass change hands several times, the Israelis charged through the position. The Egyptians suffered heavy casualties and tank losses, while Israeli losses stood at 66 dead, 93 wounded and 28 tanks. Emerging at the western end, Israeli forces advanced to the outskirts of Arish. As it reached the outskirts of Arish, Tal's division also consolidated its hold on Rafah and Khan Yunis.

The following day, 6 June, the Israeli forces on the outskirts of Arish were reinforced by the 7th Brigade, which fought its way through the Jiradi pass. After receiving supplies via an airdrop, the Israelis entered the city and captured the airport at 7:50 a.m. The Israelis entered the city at 8:00 a.m. Company commander Yossi Peled said: "Al-Arish was totally quiet, desolate. Suddenly, the city turned into a madhouse. Shots came at us from every alley, every corner, every window and house." An IDF record stated that "clearing the city was hard fighting. The Egyptians fired from the rooftops, from balconies and windows. They dropped grenades into our half-tracks and blocked the streets with trucks. Our men threw the grenades back and crushed the trucks with their tanks." Gonen sent additional units to Arish, and the city was eventually taken.

Brigadier-General Avraham Yoffe's assignment was to penetrate Sinai south of Tal's forces and north of Sharon's. Yoffe's attack allowed Tal to complete the capture of the Jiradi defile, Khan Yunis. All of them were taken after fierce fighting. Gonen subsequently dispatched a force of tanks, infantry and engineers under Colonel Yisrael Granit to continue down the Mediterranean coast towards the Suez Canal, while a second force led by Gonen himself turned south and captured Bir Lahfan and Jabal Libni.

==== Mid-front (Abu-Ageila) Israeli division ====
Further south, on 6 June, the Israeli 38th Armored Division under Major-General Ariel Sharon assaulted Um-Katef, a heavily fortified area defended by the Egyptian 2nd Infantry Division under Major-General Sa'adi Naguib (though Naguib was actually absent) of Soviet World War II armor, which included 90 T-34-85 tanks, 22 SU-100 tank destroyers, and about 16,000 men. The Israelis had about 14,000 men and 150 post-World War II tanks including the AMX-13, Centurions, and M50 Super Shermans (modified M-4 Sherman tanks).

Two armored brigades in the meantime, under Avraham Yoffe, slipped across the border through sandy wastes that Egypt had left undefended because they were considered impassable. Simultaneously, Sharon's tanks from the west were to engage Egyptian forces on Um-Katef ridge and block any reinforcements. Israeli infantry would clear the three trenches, while heliborne paratroopers would land behind Egyptian lines and silence their artillery. An armored thrust would be made at al-Qusmaya to unnerve and isolate its garrison.

As Sharon's division advanced into the Sinai, Egyptian forces staged successful delaying actions at Tarat Umm, Umm Tarfa, and Hill 181. An Israeli jet was downed by antiaircraft fire, and Sharon's forces came under heavy shelling as they advanced from the north and west. The Israeli advance, which had to cope with extensive minefields, took a large number of casualties. A column of Israeli tanks managed to penetrate the northern flank of Abu Ageila, and by dusk, all units were in position. The Israelis then brought up ninety 105-mm and 155-mm artillery cannons for a preparatory barrage, while civilian buses brought reserve infantrymen under Colonel Yekutiel Adam and helicopters arrived to ferry the paratroopers. These movements were unobserved by the Egyptians, who were preoccupied with Israeli probes against their perimeter.

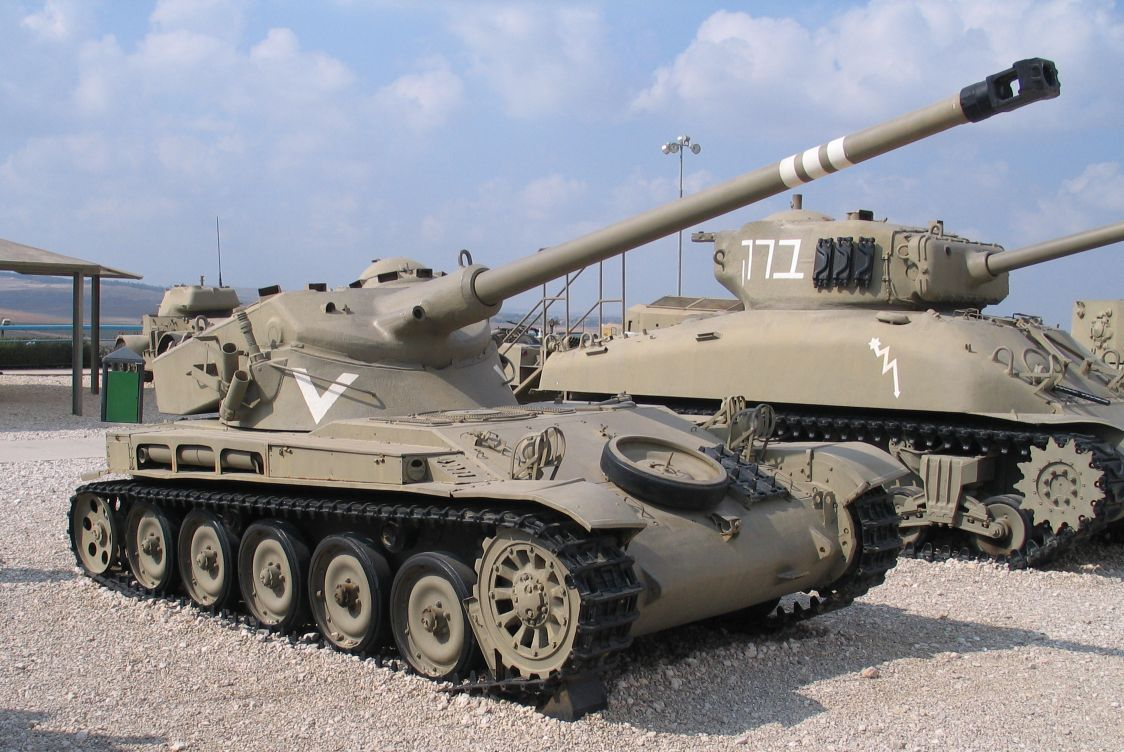
Israeli armor of the Six-Day War: pictured here the AMX 13

As night fell, the Israeli assault troops lit flashlights, each battalion a different colour, to prevent friendly fire incidents. At 10:00 p.m., Israeli artillery began a barrage on Um-Katef, firing some 6,000 shells in less than 20 minutes, the most concentrated artillery barrage in Israel's history. Israeli tanks assaulted the northernmost Egyptian defenses and were largely successful, though an entire armored brigade was stalled by mines, and had only one mine-clearance tank. Israeli infantrymen assaulted the triple line of trenches in the east. To the west, paratroopers commanded by Colonel Danny Matt landed behind Egyptian lines, though half the helicopters got lost and never found the battlefield, while others were unable to land due to mortar fire.

Those that successfully landed on target destroyed Egyptian artillery and ammunition dumps and separated gun crews from their batteries, sowing enough confusion to significantly reduce Egyptian artillery fire. Egyptian reinforcements from Jabal Libni advanced towards Um-Katef to counterattack but failed to reach their objective, being subjected to heavy air attacks and encountering Israeli lodgements on the roads. Egyptian commanders then called in artillery attacks on their own positions. The Israelis accomplished and sometimes exceeded their overall plan and had largely succeeded by the following day. The Egyptians suffered about 2,000 casualties, while the Israelis lost 42 dead and 140 wounded.

Yoffe's attack allowed Sharon to complete the capture of the Um-Katef, after fierce fighting. The main thrust at Um-Katef was stalled due to mines and craters. After IDF engineers had cleared a path by 4:00 pm, Israeli and Egyptian tanks engaged in fierce combat, often at ranges as close as ten yards. The battle ended in an Israeli victory, with 40 Egyptian and 19 Israeli tanks destroyed. Meanwhile, Israeli infantry finished clearing out the Egyptian trenches, with Israeli casualties standing at 14 dead and 41 wounded and Egyptian casualties at 300 dead and 100 taken prisoner.

==== Other Israeli forces ====
Further south, on 5 June, the 8th Armored Brigade under Colonel Albert Mandler, initially positioned as a ruse to draw off Egyptian forces from the real invasion routes, attacked the fortified bunkers at Kuntilla, a strategically valuable position whose capture would enable Mandler to block reinforcements from reaching Um-Katef and to join Sharon's upcoming attack on Nakhl. The defending Egyptian battalion outnumbered and outgunned, fiercely resisted the attack, hitting several Israeli tanks. Most of the defenders were killed, and only three Egyptian tanks, one of them damaged, survived. By nightfall, Mandler's forces had taken Kuntilla.

With the exceptions of Rafah and Khan Yunis, Israeli forces had initially avoided entering the Gaza Strip. Israeli Defense Minister Moshe Dayan had expressly forbidden entry into the area. After Palestinian positions in Gaza opened fire on the Negev settlements of Nirim and Kissufim, IDF Chief of Staff Yitzhak Rabin overrode Dayan's instructions and ordered the 11th Mechanized Brigade under Colonel Yehuda Reshef to enter the Strip. The force was immediately met with heavy artillery fire and fierce resistance from Palestinian forces and remnants of the Egyptian forces from Rafah.

By sunset, the Israelis had taken the strategically vital Ali Muntar ridge, overlooking Gaza City, but were beaten back from the city itself. Some 70 Israelis were killed, along with Israeli journalist Ben Oyserman and American journalist Paul Schutzer. Twelve members of UNEF were also killed. On the war's second day, 6 June, the Israelis were bolstered by the 35th Paratroopers Brigade under Colonel Rafael Eitan and took Gaza City along with the entire Strip. The fighting was fierce and accounted for nearly half of all Israeli casualties on the southern front. Gaza rapidly fell to the Israelis.

Meanwhile, on 6 June, two Israeli reserve brigades under Yoffe, each equipped with 100 tanks, penetrated the Sinai south of Tal's division and north of Sharon's, capturing the road junctions of Abu Ageila, Bir Lahfan, and Arish, taking all of them before midnight. Two Egyptian armored brigades counterattacked, and a fierce battle took place until the following morning. The Egyptians were beaten back by fierce resistance coupled with airstrikes, sustaining heavy tank losses. They fled west towards Jabal Libni.

==== The Egyptian Army ====
During the ground fighting, remnants of the Egyptian Air Force attacked Israeli ground forces but took losses from the Israeli Air Force and from Israeli anti-aircraft units. Throughout the last four days, Egyptian aircraft flew 150 sorties against Israeli units in the Sinai.

Many of the Egyptian units remained intact and could have tried to prevent the Israelis from reaching the Suez Canal, or engaged in combat in the attempt to reach the canal, but when the Egyptian Field Marshal Abdel Hakim Amer heard about the fall of Abu-Ageila, he panicked and ordered all units in the Sinai to retreat. This order effectively meant the defeat of Egypt.

Meanwhile, President Nasser, having learned of the results of the Israeli air strikes, decided together with Field Marshal Amer to order a general retreat from the Sinai within 24 hours. No detailed instructions were given concerning the manner and sequence of withdrawal.

==== Next fighting days ====
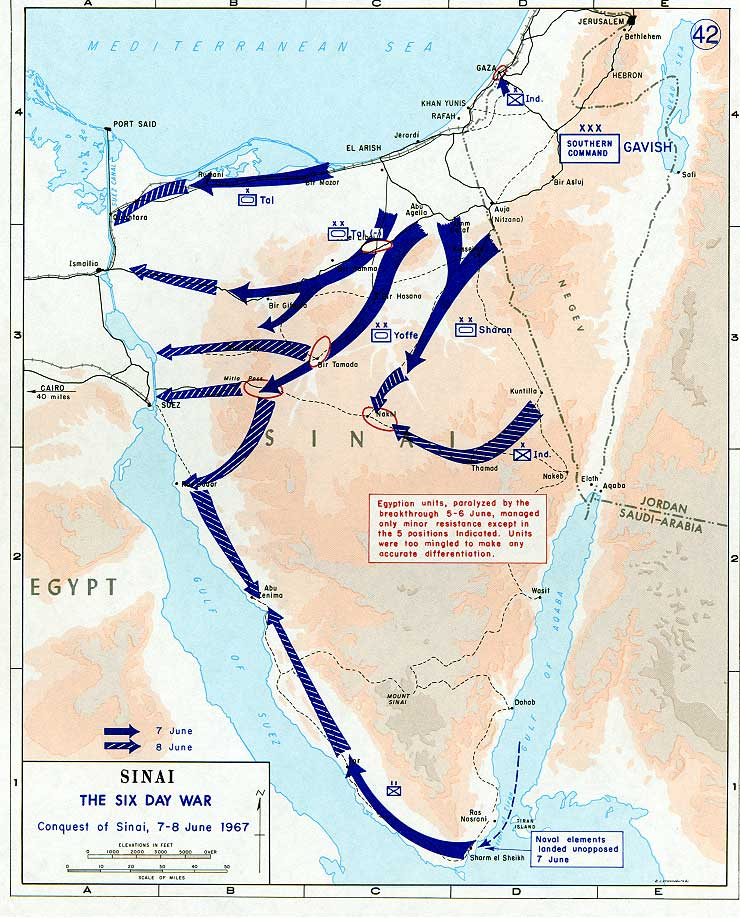
The capture of Sinai. 7–8 June 1967

A newsreel from 6 June about the first Israeli–Egyptian fighting

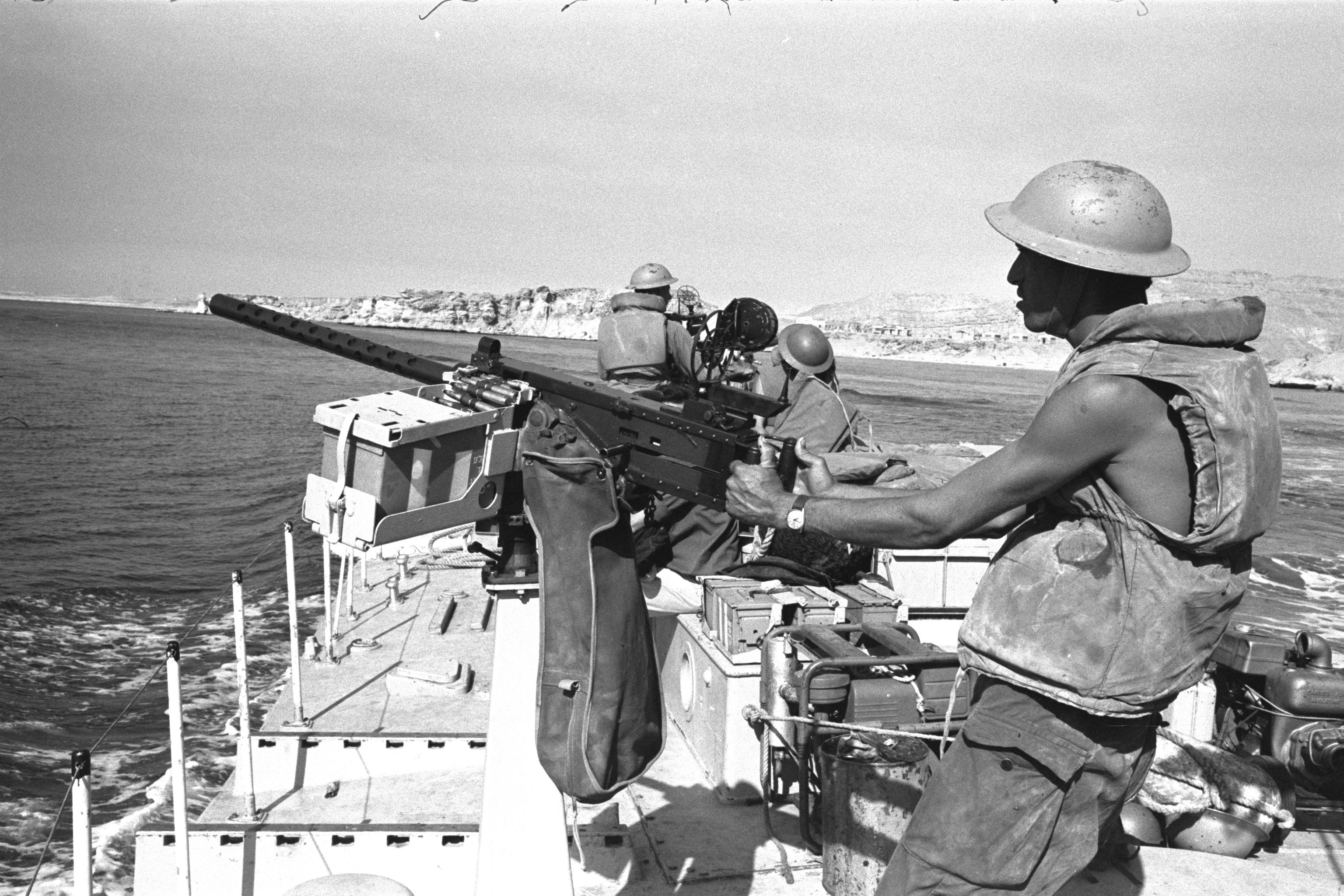
An Israeli gunboat passes through the Straits of Tiran near Sharm El Sheikh.

As Egyptian columns retreated, Israeli aircraft and artillery attacked them. Israeli jets used napalm bombs during their sorties. The attacks destroyed hundreds of vehicles and caused heavy casualties. At Jabal Libni, retreating Egyptian soldiers were fired upon by their own artillery. At Bir Gafgafa, the Egyptians fiercely resisted advancing Israeli forces, knocking out three tanks and eight half-tracks, and killing 20 soldiers. Due to the Egyptians' retreat, the Israeli High Command decided not to pursue the Egyptian units but rather to bypass and destroy them in the mountainous passes of West Sinai.

Therefore, on the next two days (6 and 7 June), all three Israeli divisions (Sharon and Tal were reinforced by an armored brigade each) rushed westward and reached the passes. Sharon's division first went southward then westward, via An-Nakhl, to Mitla Pass with air support. It was joined there by parts of Yoffe's division, while its other units blocked the Gidi Pass. These passes became killing grounds for the Egyptians, who ran right into waiting Israeli positions and suffered heavy losses in both soldiers and vehicles. According to Egyptian diplomat Mahmoud Riad, 10,000 men were killed in a day and many others died of thirst. Tal's units stopped at various points to the length of the Suez Canal.

Israel's blocking action was partially successful. Only the Gidi pass was captured before the Egyptians approached it, but at other places, Egyptian units managed to pass through and cross the canal to safety. Due to the haste of the Egyptian retreat, soldiers often abandoned weapons, military equipment, and hundreds of vehicles. Many Egyptian soldiers were cut off from their units had to walk about 200 kilometres (120 mi) on foot before reaching the Suez Canal with limited supplies of food and water and were exposed to intense heat. Thousands died as a result. Many Egyptian soldiers chose instead to surrender to the Israelis, who eventually exceeded their capabilities to provide for prisoners. As a result, they began directing soldiers toward the Suez Canal and imprisoned only high-ranking officers, who were expected to be exchanged for captured Israeli pilots.

According to some accounts, during the Egyptian retreat from the Sinai, a unit of Soviet Marines based on a Soviet warship in Port Said at the time came ashore and attempted to cross the Suez Canal eastward. The Soviet force was reportedly decimated by an Israeli air attack and lost 17 dead and 34 wounded. Among the wounded was the commander, Lieutenant Colonel Victor Shevchenko.

During the offensive, the Israeli Navy landed six combat divers from the Shayetet 13 naval commando unit to infiltrate Alexandria harbor. The divers sank an Egyptian minesweeper before being taken prisoner. Shayetet 13 commandos also infiltrated Port Said harbor but found no ships there. A planned commando raid against the Syrian Navy never materialized. Both Egyptian and Israeli warships made movements at sea to intimidate the other side throughout the war but did not engage each other. Israeli warships and aircraft hunted for Egyptian submarines throughout the war.

On 7 June, Israel began its attack on Sharm el-Sheikh. The Israeli Navy started the operation with a probe of Egyptian naval defenses. An aerial reconnaissance flight found that the area was less defended than originally thought. Around 4:30 a.m., three Israeli missile boats opened fire on Egyptian shore batteries, while paratroopers and commandos boarded helicopters and Nord Noratlas transport planes for an assault on Al-Tur, as Chief of Staff Rabin was convinced it was too risky to land them directly in Sharm el-Sheikh. The city had been largely abandoned the day before, and reports from air and naval forces finally convinced Rabin to divert the aircraft to Sharm el-Sheikh. There, the Israelis engaged in a pitched battle with the Egyptians and took the city, killing 20 Egyptian soldiers and taking eight more prisoners. At 12:15 p.m., Dayan announced that the Straits of Tiran constituted an international waterway open to all ships without restriction.

On 8 June, Israel completed the capture of the Sinai by sending infantry units to Ras Sudar on the western coast of the peninsula.

Several tactical elements made the swift Israeli advance possible:

1. The surprise attack that quickly gave the Israeli Air Force complete air superiority over the Egyptian Air Force.
2. The determined implementation of an innovative battle plan.
3. The lack of coordination among Egyptian troops.

These factors also proved to be decisive elements on Israel's other fronts.

=== West Bank ===
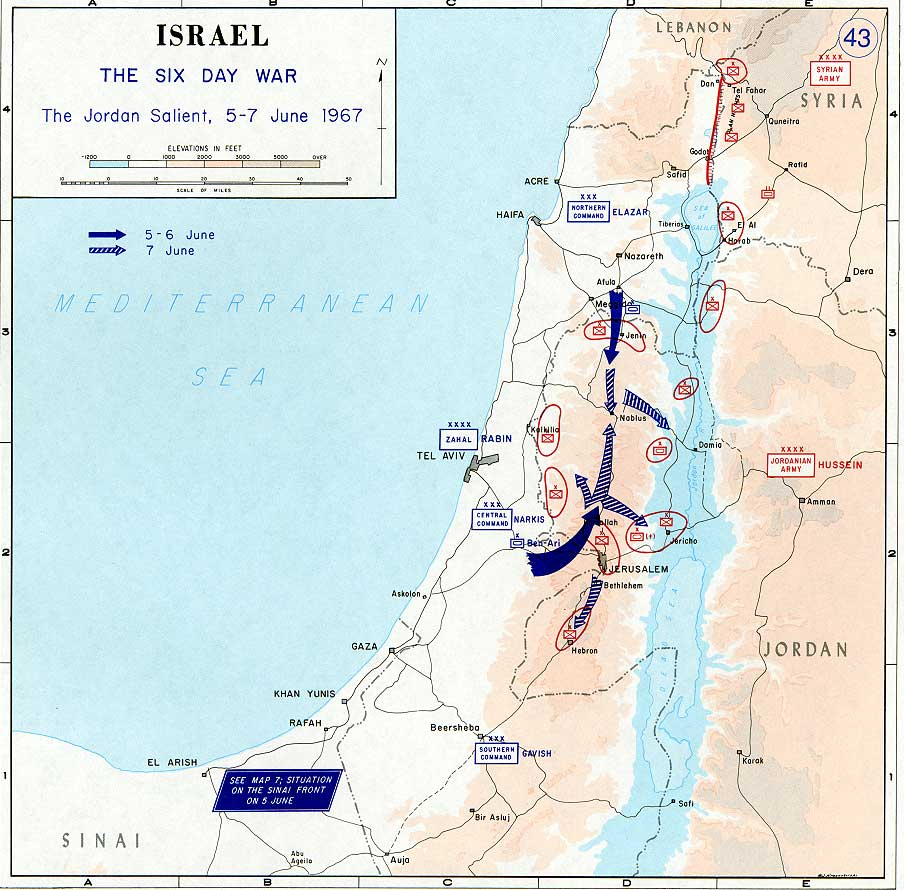
The Jordan salient, 5–7 June.

==== Egyptian control of Jordanian forces ====
King Hussein gave of his army to Egypt on 1 June, on which date Egyptian General Riad arrived in Amman to take control of the Jordanian military. (Note: Shlaim writes: "To understand Hussein's conduct during the June 1967 War it is essential to recall that he had handed over command of his army to Egypt under the terms of his pact with Nasser. On 1 June, General Riad arrived in Amman and assumed command of the Jordanian armed forces.")

Egyptian Field Marshal Amer used the confusion of the conflict's first hours to cable to Amman that he was victorious; he claimed as evidence a radar sighting of a squadron of Israeli aircraft returning from bombing raids in Egypt, which he said was an Egyptian aircraft en route to attack Israel. In this cable, sent shortly before 9:00 a.m., Riad was ordered to attack. (Note: On the initial Jordanian attack, Shlaim writes: "The cable was from First Vice-President and Deputy Supreme Commander Field Marshal Abd al-Hakim Amer. Amer was a nincompoop who largely owed his rapid promotion to his friendship with Nasser... He was inexperienced in military affairs, impulsive, and prone to wishful thinking... Amer's cable to Riad was a pack of lies... On the basis of these alleged successes, Amer ordered Riad to open a new front against the enemy and launch offensive operations. By the time Hussein arrived at the headquarters, Riad had already given the orders for the artillery to move to the front lines and bombard Israeli airbases and other targets; an infantry brigade to occupy the Israeli enclave on Mount Scopus in Jerusalem; the two Egyptian commando battalions to infiltrate enemy territory from the West Bank at dusk; and the air force to be put on combat alert and commence airstrikes immediately. Although these decisions were made in his absence, Hussein made no attempt to cancel them or to delay the opening of fire until the information from Cairo could be checked. Jordan was thus committed to war by the decision of an Egyptian general who was acting on the orders of a serial blunderer in Cairo.")

==== Initial attack ====
One of the Jordanian brigades stationed in the West Bank was sent to the Hebron area to link with the Egyptians.

The IDF's strategic plan was to remain on the defensive along the Jordanian front, to enable focus in the expected campaign against Egypt.

Intermittent machine-gun exchanges began taking place in Jerusalem at 9:30 a.m., and the fighting gradually escalated as the Jordanians introduced mortar and recoilless rifle fire. On General Narkis's orders, the Israelis responded only with small-arms fire, firing in a flat trajectory to avoid hitting civilians, holy sites, or the Old City. At 10:00 a.m. on 5 June, the Jordanian Army began shelling Israel. Two batteries of 155-mm Long Tom cannons opened fire on the suburbs of Tel Aviv and Ramat David Airbase. The commanders of these batteries were instructed to lay a two-hour barrage against military and civilian settlements in central Israel. Some shells hit the outskirts of Tel Aviv.

By 10:30 a.m., Eshkol had sent King Hussein a message via Odd Bull promising not to initiate any action against Jordan if it stayed out of the war. Hussein replied that it was too late and "the die was cast". At 11:15 a.m., Jordanian howitzers began a 6,000-shell barrage at Israeli Jerusalem. The Jordanians initially targeted kibbutz Ramat Rachel in the south and Mount Scopus in the north, then ranged into the city center and outlying neighborhoods. Military installations, the Prime Minister's Residence, and the Knesset compound were also targeted. Jordanian forces shelled the Beit HaNassi and the Biblical Zoo, killing 15 civilians. Israeli civilian casualties totalled 20 dead and over 1,000 wounded. Some 900 buildings were damaged, including Hadassah Ein Kerem Hospital, which had its Chagall-made windows destroyed.

Around midday, eight Iraqi Hawker Hunters attacked the Kfar Sirkin airfield, destroying a Noratlas transport aircraft and a Piper Super Cub. Four Jordanian Hunters also hit a factory hall in Netanya, killing one civilian and wounding seven.

==== Israeli cabinet meets ====
When the Israeli cabinet convened to decide on a plan of action, Yigal Allon and Menahem Begin argued that this was an opportunity to take the Old City of Jerusalem, but Eshkol decided to defer any decision until Moshe Dayan and Yitzhak Rabin could be consulted. Uzi Narkiss made proposals for military action, including the capture of Latrun, but the cabinet turned him down. Dayan rejected multiple requests from Narkiss for permission to mount an infantry assault towards Mount Scopus but sanctioned some limited retaliatory actions.

==== Initial response ====
Shortly before 12:30 p.m., the Israeli Air Force attacked Jordan's two airbases. The Hawker Hunters were refueling at the time of the attack. The Israeli aircraft attacked in two waves; the first cratered the runways and knocked out the control towers, and the second destroyed all 21 of Jordan's Hawker Hunter fighters, six transport aircraft, and two helicopters. One Israeli jet was shot down by ground fire.

Three Israeli Vautours also attacked H-3, an airfield in western Iraq used by the Iraqi Air Force. During the attack, three MiG-21s, one Hunter, one de Havilland Dove and one Antonov An-12 were destroyed on the ground. They also damaged the runway, although it was repaired by the next morning. The Jordanian radar facility at Ajloun was also destroyed in an Israeli airstrike.

Israeli Fouga Magister jets attacked the Jordanian 40th Brigade with rockets as it moved south from the Damia Bridge. Dozens of tanks were knocked out, and a convoy of 26 trucks carrying ammunition was destroyed. In Jerusalem, Israel responded to Jordanian shelling with a missile strike that devastated Jordanian positions. The Israelis used the L missile, a surface-to-surface missile developed jointly with France in secret.

The next morning, three Iraqi Hawker Hunters attacked a group of tanks in the process of refueling next to the road between Nazareth and Haifa. An Iraqi Tupolev Tu-16 also bombed a military installation 10 kilometers southeast of Afula, killing two Israeli soldiers, while another attacked Netanya and Ramat David Airbase, before being shot down near the Megiddo airfield. The aircraft crashed into a military storage complex hidden in a forest, killing its crew and 16 Israeli soldiers. Four Israeli Vautours escorted by two Mirages re-attacked the H-3 airfield, resulting in one Hunter crashing on take-off, and a Hunter and a MiG-21 being damaged in air combat.

On 7 June, four Vautours escorted by four Mirages attacked the H-3 airfield for the third time. This resulted in an air combat with Hunters, piloted by Iraqis, as well as a Jordanian and Pakistani pilot Saiful Azam. One Iraqi Hunter was shot down and its pilot killed, while the Israelis lost two Vautours and one Mirage, with three crewmen dead and two taken prisoner.

==== Jordanian battalion at Government House ====
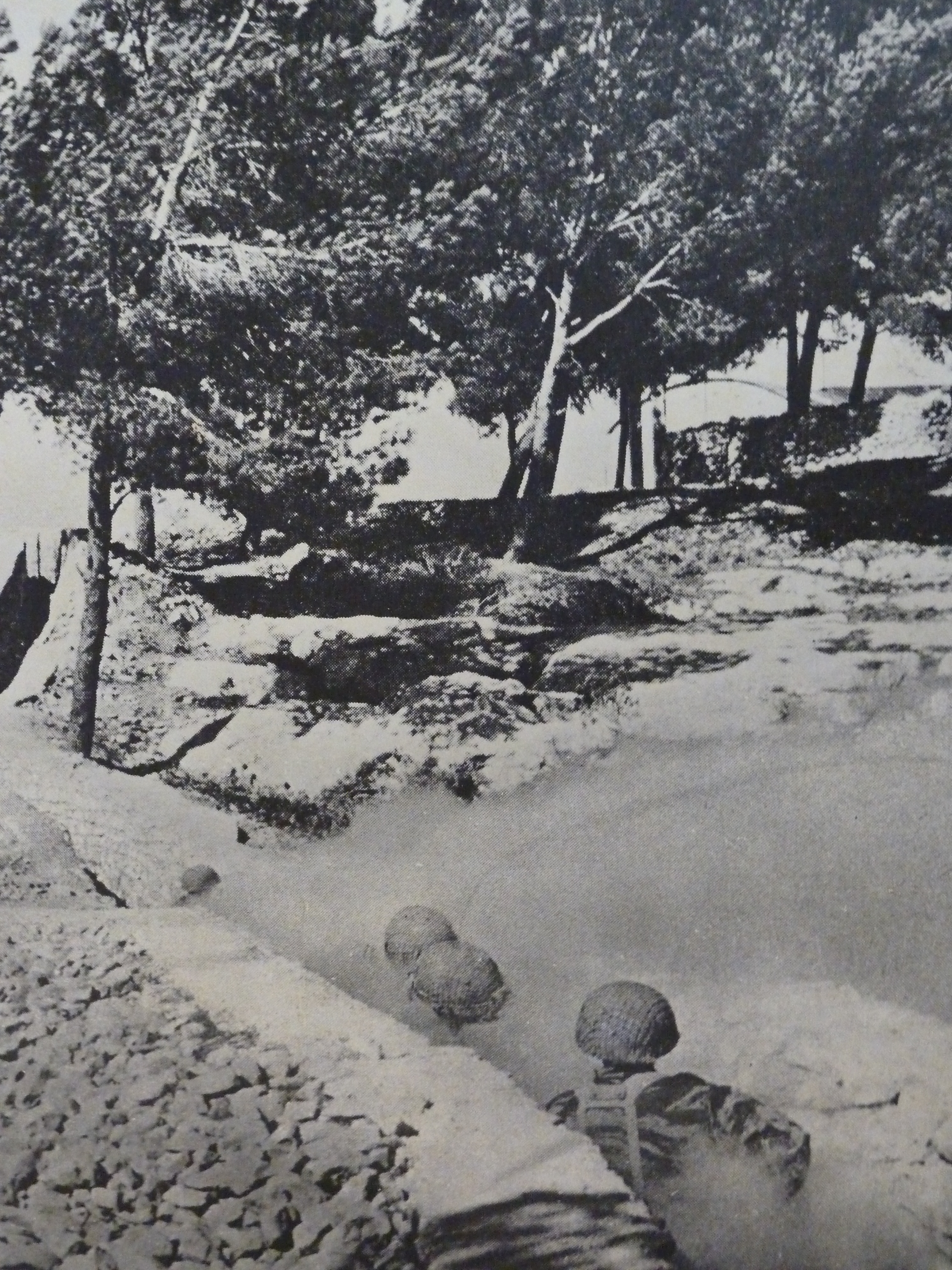
Israeli paratroopers flush out Jordanian soldiers from trenches during the Battle of Ammunition Hill.

A Jordanian battalion advanced up Government House ridge and dug in at the perimeter of Government House, the headquarters of the United Nations observers, and opened fire on Ramat Rachel, the Allenby Barracks and the Jewish section of Abu Tor with mortars and recoilless rifles. UN observers fiercely protested the incursion into the neutral zone, and several manhandled a Jordanian machine gun out of Government House after the crew had set it up in a second-floor window. After the Jordanians occupied Jabel Mukaber, an advance patrol was sent out and approached Ramat Rachel, where they came under fire from four civilians, including the wife of the director, who were armed with old Czech-made weapons.

The immediate Israeli response was an offensive to retake Government House and its ridge. The Jerusalem Brigade's Reserve Battalion 161, under Lieutenant-Colonel Asher Dreizin, was given the task. Dreizin had two infantry companies and eight tanks under his command, several of which broke down or became stuck in the mud at Ramat Rachel, leaving three for the assault. The Jordanians mounted fierce resistance, knocking out two tanks.

The Israelis broke through the compound's western gate and began clearing the building with grenades, before General Odd Bull, commander of the UN observers, compelled the Israelis to hold their fire, telling them that the Jordanians had already fled. The Israelis proceeded to take the Antenna Hill, directly behind Government House, and clear out a series of bunkers to the west and south. The fighting often conducted hand-to-hand, continued for nearly four hours before the surviving Jordanians fell back to trenches held by the Hittin Brigade, which were steadily overwhelmed. By 6:30 am, the Jordanians had retreated to Bethlehem, having suffered about 100 casualties. All but ten of Dreizin's soldiers were casualties, and Dreizin himself was wounded three times.

==== Israeli invasion ====
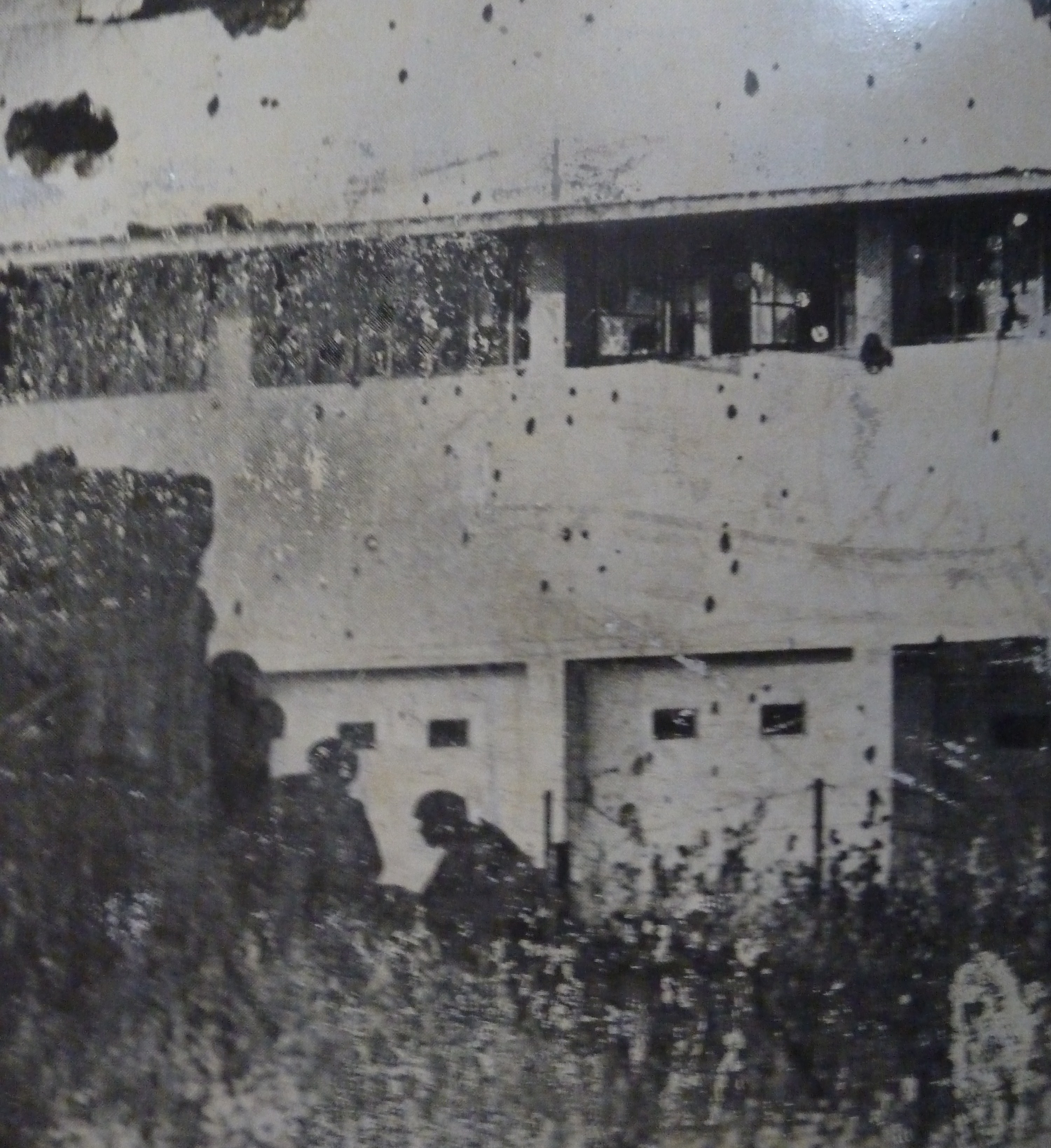
Silhouette of Israeli paratroops advancing on Ammunition Hill

During the late afternoon of 5 June, the Israelis launched an offensive to encircle Jerusalem, which lasted into the following day. During the night, they were supported by intense tank, artillery and mortar fire to soften up Jordanian positions. Searchlights placed atop the Labor Federation building, then the tallest in Israeli Jerusalem, exposed and blinded the Jordanians. The Jerusalem Brigade moved south of Jerusalem, while the mechanized Harel Brigade and 55th Paratroopers Brigade under Mordechai Gur encircled it from the north.

A combined force of tanks and paratroopers crossed no-man's land near the Mandelbaum Gate. Gur's 66th paratroop battalion approached the fortified Police Academy. The Israelis used Bangalore torpedoes to blast their way through barbed wire leading up to the position while exposed and under heavy fire. With the aid of two tanks borrowed from the Jerusalem Brigade, they captured the Police Academy. After receiving reinforcements, they moved up to attack Ammunition Hill.

The Jordanian defenders, who were heavily dug-in, fiercely resisted the attack. All of the Israeli officers except for two company commanders were killed, and the fighting was mostly led by individual soldiers. The fighting was conducted at close quarters in trenches and bunkers and was often hand-to-hand. The Israelis captured the position after four hours of heavy fighting. During the battle, 36 Israeli and 71 Jordanian soldiers were killed. Even after the fighting on Ammunition Hill had ended, Israeli soldiers were forced to remain in the trenches due to Jordanian sniper fire from Givat HaMivtar until the Harel Brigade overran that outpost in the afternoon.

The 66th battalion subsequently drove east and linked up with the Israeli enclave on Mount Scopus and its Hebrew University campus. Gur's other battalions, the 71st and 28th captured the other Jordanian positions around the American Colony, despite being short on men and equipment and having come under a Jordanian mortar bombardment while waiting for the signal to advance.

At the same time, the IDF's 4th Brigade attacked the fortress at Latrun, which the Jordanians had abandoned due to heavy Israeli tank fire. The mechanized Harel Brigade attacked Har Adar, but seven tanks were knocked out by mines, forcing the infantry to mount an assault without armored cover. The Israeli soldiers advanced under heavy fire, jumping between rocks to avoid mines and the fighting was conducted at close quarters with knives and bayonets.

The Jordanians fell back after a battle that left two Israeli and eight Jordanian soldiers dead, and Israeli forces advanced through Beit Horon toward Ramallah, taking four fortified villages along the way. By the evening, the brigade arrived in Ramallah. Meanwhile, the 163rd Infantry Battalion secured Abu Tor following a fierce battle, severing the Old City from Bethlehem and Hebron.

Meanwhile, 600 Egyptian commandos stationed in the West Bank moved to attack Israeli airfields. Led by Jordanian intelligence scouts, they crossed the border and began infiltrating through Israeli settlements towards Ramla and Hatzor. They were soon detected and sought shelter in nearby fields, which the Israelis set on fire. Some 450 commandos were killed, and the remainder escaped to Jordan.

From the American Colony, the paratroopers moved towards the Old City. Their plan was to approach it via the lightly defended Salah al-Din Street but made a wrong turn onto the heavily defended Nablus Road and ran into fierce resistance. Their tanks fired at point-blank range down the street, while the paratroopers mounted repeated charges. Despite repelling repeated Israeli charges, the Jordanians gradually gave way to Israeli firepower and momentum. The Israelis suffered some 30 casualties – half the original force – while the Jordanians lost 45 dead and 142 wounded.

Meanwhile, the Israeli 71st Battalion breached barbed wire and minefields and emerged near Wadi Joz, near the base of Mount Scopus, from where the Old City could be cut off from Jericho and East Jerusalem from Ramallah. Israeli artillery targeted the one remaining route from Jerusalem to the West Bank, and shellfire deterred the Jordanians from counterattacking from their positions at Augusta-Victoria. An Israeli detachment then captured the Rockefeller Museum after a brief skirmish.

Afterwards, the Israelis broke through to the Jerusalem-Ramallah road. At Tel al-Ful, the Harel Brigade fought a running battle with up to 30 Jordanian tanks. The Jordanians stalled the advance and destroyed some half-tracks, but the Israelis launched air attacks and exploited the vulnerability of the external fuel tanks mounted on the Jordanian tanks. The Jordanians lost half their tanks and retreated towards Jericho. Joining up with the 4th Brigade, the Israelis then descended through Shuafat and the site of what is now French Hill, through Jordanian defenses at Mivtar, emerging at Ammunition Hill.

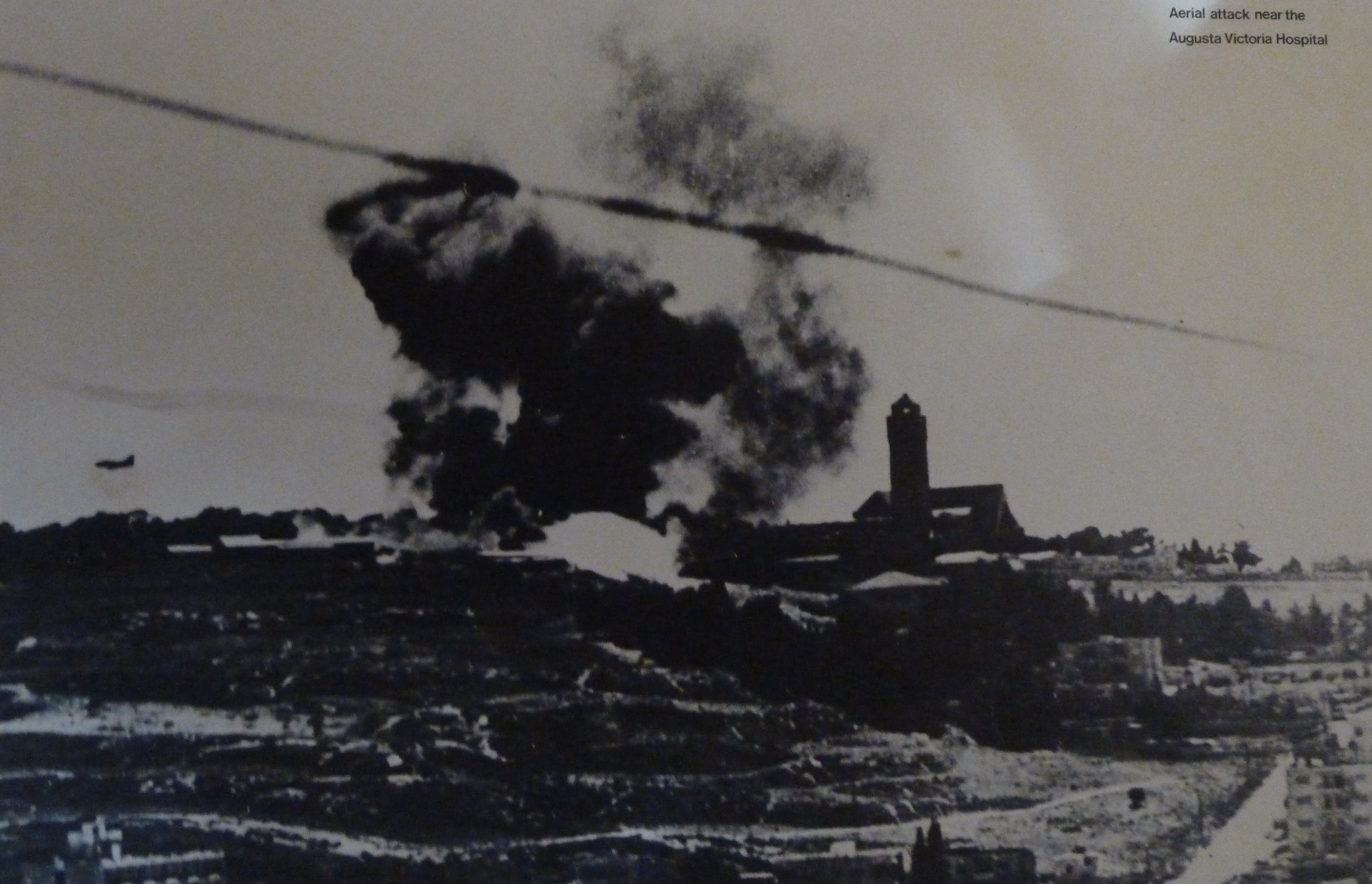
An Israeli airstrike near the Augusta-Victoria Hospital

With Jordanian defenses in Jerusalem crumbling, elements of the Jordanian 60th Brigade and an infantry battalion were sent from Jericho to reinforce Jerusalem. Its original orders were to repel the Israelis from the Latrun corridor, but due to the worsening situation in Jerusalem, the brigade was ordered to proceed to Jerusalem's Arab suburbs and attack Mount Scopus. Parallel to the brigade were infantrymen from the Imam Ali Brigade, who were approaching Issawiya. The brigades were spotted by Israeli aircraft and decimated by rocket and cannon fire. Other Jordanian attempts to reinforce Jerusalem were beaten back, either by armored ambushes or airstrikes.

Fearing damage to holy sites and the prospect of having to fight in built-up areas, Dayan ordered his troops not to enter the Old City. He also feared that Israel would be subjected to a fierce international backlash and the outrage of Christians worldwide if it forced its way into the Old City. Privately, he told David Ben-Gurion that he was also concerned over the prospect of Israel capturing Jerusalem's holy sites, only to be forced to give them up under the threat of international sanctions.

==== The West Bank ====
Israel gained near total control of the West Bank by the evening of 7 June and began its military occupation of the West Bank on that day, issuing a military order, the "Proclamation Regarding Law and Administration (The West Bank Area) (No. 2)—1967", which established the military government in the West Bank and granted the commander of the area full legislative, executive, and judicial power. Jordan had realised that it had no hope of defense as early as the morning of 6 June. At Nasser's request, Egypt's Abdul Munim Riad sent a situation update at midday on 6 June:

The situation on the West Bank is rapidly deteriorating. A concentrated attack has been launched on all axes, together with heavy fire, day and night. Jordanian, Syrian and Iraqi air forces in position H3 have been virtually destroyed. Upon consultation with King Hussein I have been asked to convey to you the following choices:

1. A political decision to cease fighting to be imposed by a third party (the USA, the Soviet Union or the Security Council).
2. To vacate the West Bank tonight.
3. To go on fighting for one more day, resulting in the isolation and destruction of the entire Jordanian Army.

King Hussein has asked me to refer this matter to you for an immediate reply.

An Egyptian order for Jordanian forces to withdraw across the Jordan River was issued at 10 am on 6 June; that afternoon King Hussein learned of the impending United Nations Security Council Resolution 233 and decided instead to hold out in the hope that a ceasefire would be implemented soon. It was already too late, as the counterorder caused confusion and in many cases, it was impossible to regain positions that had been left.

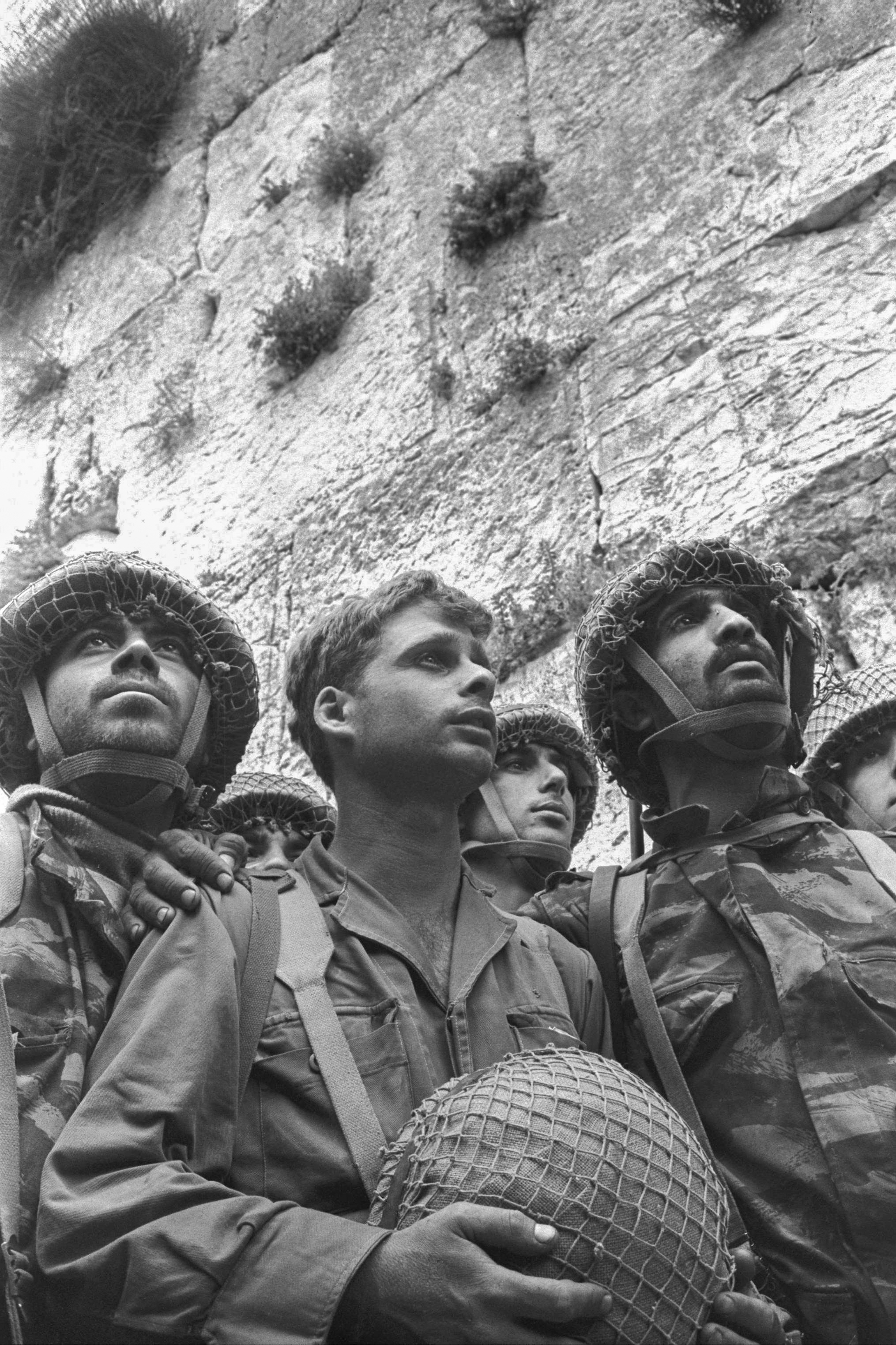
David Rubinger's iconic photograph of IDF paratroopers at Jerusalem's Western Wall shortly after its capture. The soldiers in the foreground are (from left) Zion Karasenti, Yitzhak Yifat, and Haim Oshri.

On 7 June, Dayan ordered his troops not to enter the Old City but, upon hearing that the UN was about to declare a ceasefire, changed his mind, and without cabinet clearance, decided to capture it. Two paratroop battalions attacked Augusta-Victoria Hill, high ground overlooking the Old City from the east. One battalion attacked from Mount Scopus, and another attacked from the valley between it and the Old City. Another paratroop battalion, personally led by Gur, broke into the Old City and was joined by the other two battalions after their missions were complete. The paratroopers met little resistance. The fighting was conducted solely by the paratroopers; the Israelis did not use armor during the battle out of fear of severe damage to the Old City.

In the north, a battalion from Peled's division checked Jordanian defenses in the Jordan Valley. A brigade from Peled's division captured the western part of the West Bank. One brigade attacked Jordanian artillery positions around Jenin, which were shelling Ramat David Airbase. The Jordanian 12th Armored Battalion, which outnumbered the Israelis, held off repeated attempts to capture Jenin. Israeli air attacks took their toll, and the Jordanian M48 Pattons, with their external fuel tanks, proved vulnerable at short distances, even to the Israeli-modified Shermans. Twelve Jordanian tanks were destroyed, and only six remained operational.

Just after dusk, Israeli reinforcements arrived. The Jordanians continued to fiercely resist, and the Israelis were unable to advance without artillery and air support. One Israeli jet attacked the Jordanian commander's tank, wounding him and killing his radio operator and intelligence officer. The surviving Jordanian forces then withdrew to Jenin, where they were reinforced by the 25th Infantry Brigade. The Jordanians were effectively surrounded in Jenin.

Jordanian infantry and their three remaining tanks managed to hold off the Israelis until 4:00 a.m., when three battalions arrived to reinforce them in the afternoon. The Jordanian tanks charged and knocked out multiple Israeli vehicles, and the tide began to shift. After sunrise, Israeli jets and artillery conducted a two-hour bombardment against the Jordanians. The Jordanians lost 10 dead and 250 wounded, and had only seven tanks left, including two without gas, and 16 APCs. The Israelis then fought their way into Jenin and captured the city after fierce fighting.

After the Old City fell, the Jerusalem Brigade reinforced the paratroopers, and continued to the south, capturing Judea and Gush Etzion. Hebron was taken with no resistance. Fearful that Israeli soldiers would exact retribution for the 1929 massacre of the city's Jewish community, Hebron's residents flew white sheets from their windows and rooftops. The Harel Brigade proceeded eastward, descending to the Jordan River.

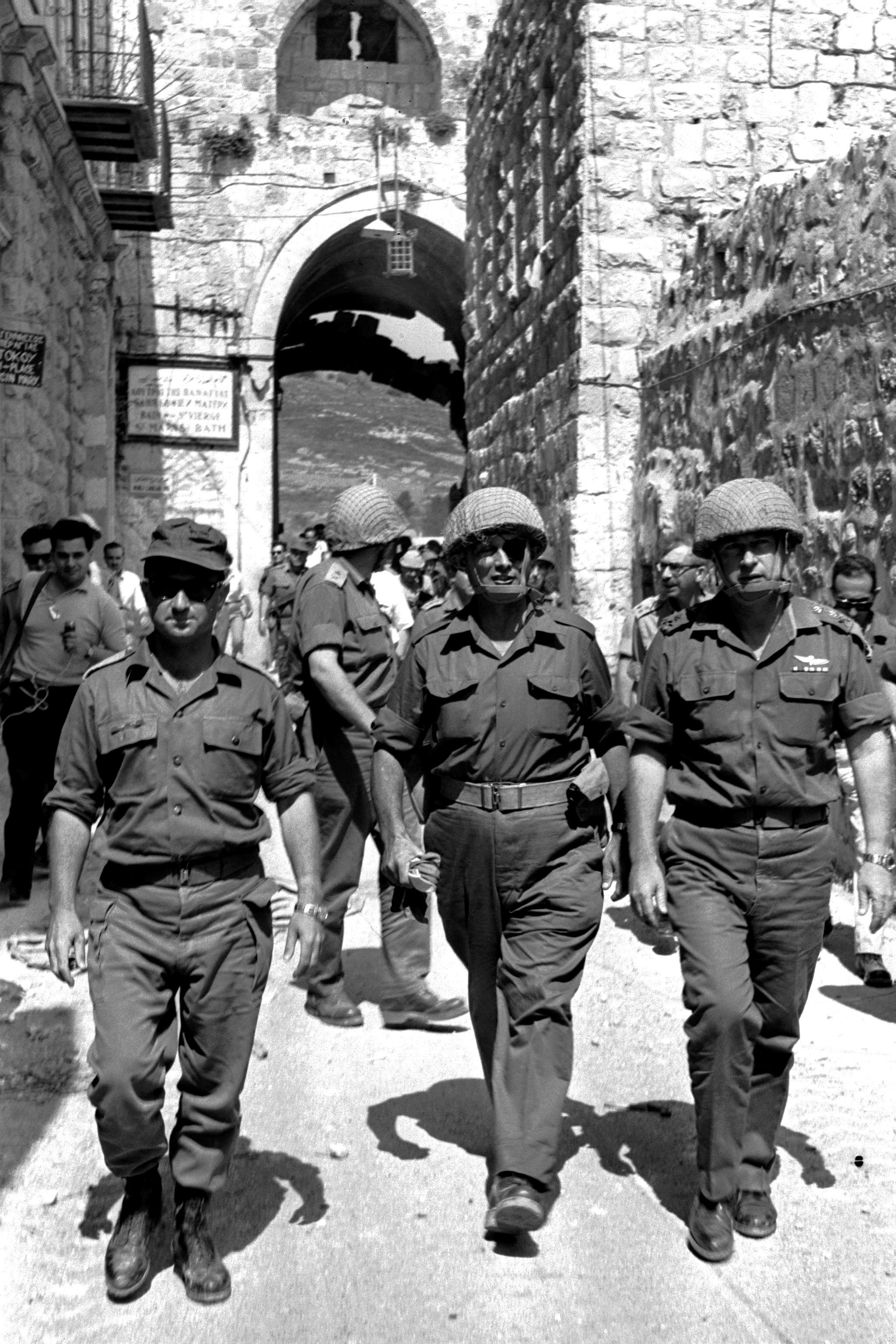
From left, General Uzi Narkiss, Defense Minister Moshe Dayan, and Chief of Staff Lt. General Yitzhak Rabin in the Old City of Jerusalem after its fall to Israeli forces

On 7 June, Israeli forces took Bethlehem after a brief battle that left some 40 Jordanian soldiers dead, with the remainder fleeing. The same day, one of Peled's brigades seized Nablus; it then joined one of Central Command's armored brigades to fight the Jordanian forces, as the Jordanians held the advantage of superior equipment and were equal in numbers to the Israelis.

Again, the IAF's air superiority proved paramount as it immobilized the Jordanians, leading to their defeat. One of Peled's brigades joined with its Central Command counterparts coming from Ramallah, and the remaining two blocked the Jordan river crossings together with the Central Command's 10th. Engineering Corps sappers blew up the Abdullah and Hussein bridges with captured Jordanian mortar shells, while elements of the Harel Brigade crossed the river and occupied positions along the east bank to cover them, but quickly pulled back due to American pressure. Anticipating an Israeli offensive deep into Jordan, the Jordanians assembled the remnants of their army and Iraqi units in Jordan to protect the western approaches to Amman and the southern slopes of the Golan Heights.

As Israel continued its offensive on 7 June, taking no account of the UN ceasefire resolution, the Egyptian-Jordanian command ordered a full Jordanian withdrawal for the second time, in order to avoid an annihilation of the Jordanian army. This was complete by nightfall on 7 June.

After the Old City was captured, Dayan told his troops to "dig in" to hold it. When an armored brigade commander entered the West Bank on his own initiative, and stated that he could see Jericho, Dayan ordered him back. It was only after intelligence reports indicated that Hussein had withdrawn his forces across the Jordan River that Dayan ordered his troops to capture the West Bank. According to Narkis:

First, the Israeli government had no intention of capturing the West Bank. On the contrary, it was opposed to it. Second, there was not any provocation on the part of the IDF. Third, the rein was only loosened when a real threat to Jerusalem's security emerged. This is truly how things happened on June 5, although it is difficult to believe. The result was something that no one had planned.

=== Golan Heights ===
The Battle of Golan Heights, 9–10 June.

In May–June 1967, in preparation for conflict, the Israeli government planned to confine the confrontation to the Egyptian front, whilst taking into account the possibility of some fighting on the Syrian front.

==== Syrian front 5–8 June ====
Syria largely stayed out of the conflict for the first four days.

During this period, false Egyptian reports of a crushing victory over the Israeli army and forecasts that Egyptian forces would soon attack Tel Aviv sporadically influenced Syria's decision to enter the war. Syrian artillery began shelling northern Israel and 12 Syrian jets attacked Israeli settlements in the Galilee. Israeli fighter jets intercepted the Syrian aircraft, shooting down three and driving off the rest. In addition, two Lebanese Hawker Hunter jets, two of the 12 Lebanon had, crossed into Israeli airspace and began strafing Israeli positions in the Galilee. They were intercepted by Israeli fighter jets, and one was shot down.

On the evening of 5 June, the Israeli Air Force attacked Syrian airfields. The Syrian Air Force lost some 32 MiG 21s, 23 MiG-15 and MiG-17 fighters, and two Ilyushin Il-28 bombers, two-thirds of its fighting strength. The Syrian aircraft that survived the attack retreated to distant bases and played no further role in the war. After the attack, Syria realized that the news it had received from Egypt of the Israeli military's near-total destruction could not have been true.

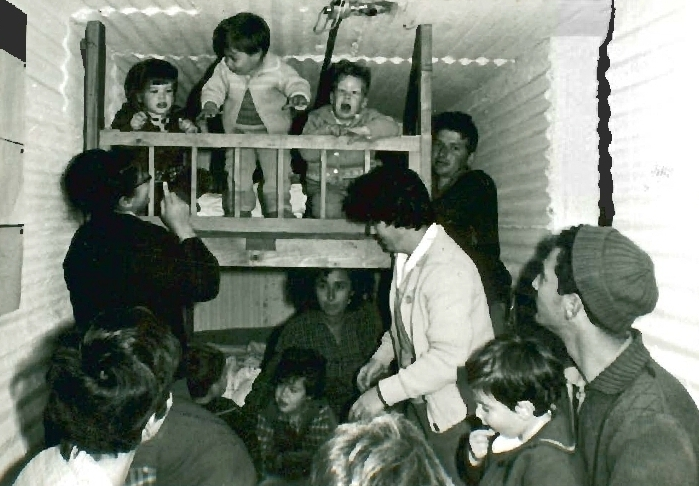
People in a bomb shelter at Kibbutz Dan

On 6 June, a minor Syrian force tried to capture the water plants at Tel Dan (the subject of a fierce escalation two years earlier), Dan, and She'ar Yashuv. These attacks were repulsed with the loss of twenty soldiers and seven tanks. An Israeli officer was also killed. But a broader Syrian offensive quickly failed. Syrian reserve units were broken up by Israeli air attacks, and several tanks were reported to have sunk in the Jordan River.

Other problems included tanks being too wide for bridges, lack of radio communications between tanks and infantry, and units ignoring orders to advance. A post-war Syrian army report concluded:

Our forces did not go on the offensive either because they did not arrive or were not wholly prepared or because they could not find shelter from the enemy's aircraft. The reserves could not withstand the air attacks; they dispersed after their morale plummeted.

The Syrians bombarded Israeli civilian settlements in the Galilee Panhandle with two battalions of M-46 130mm guns, four companies of heavy mortars, and dug-in Panzer IV tanks. The Syrian bombardment killed two civilians and hit 205 houses as well as farming installations. An inaccurate report from a Syrian officer said that as a result of the bombardment that "the enemy appears to have suffered heavy losses and is retreating".

==== Israelis debate whether the Golan Heights should be attacked ====
On 7 and 8 June, the Israeli leadership debated about whether to attack the Golan Heights as well. Syria had supported pre-war raids that had helped raise tensions and had routinely shelled Israel from the Heights, so some Israeli leaders wanted to see Syria punished. Military opinion was that the attack would be extremely costly since it would entail an uphill battle against a strongly fortified enemy. The western side of the Golan Heights consists of a rock escarpment that rises 500 meters (1,700 feet) from the Sea of Galilee and the Jordan River, and then flattens to a gently sloping plateau. Dayan opposed the operation bitterly at first, believing such an undertaking would result in losses of 30,000 and might trigger Soviet intervention. Prime Minister Eshkol, on the other hand, was more open to the possibility, as was the head of the Northern Command, David Elazar, whose unbridled enthusiasm for and confidence in the operation may have eroded Dayan's reluctance.

Eventually, the situation on the Southern and Central fronts cleared up, intelligence estimated that the likelihood of Soviet intervention had been reduced, reconnaissance showed some Syrian defenses in the Golan region collapsing, and an intercepted cable revealed that Nasser was urging the President of Syria to immediately accept a ceasefire. At 3 a.m. on 9 June, Syria announced its acceptance of the ceasefire. Despite this, Dayan became more enthusiastic about the idea and at 7 a.m. "gave the order to go into action against Syria" (Note: Israel clearly did not want the US Government to know too much about its dispositions for attacking Syria, initially planned for June 8, but postponed for 24 hours. The attack on the Liberty occurred on June 8, whereas on June 9 at 3 am, Syria announced its acceptance of the cease-fire. Despite this, at 7 am, that is, four hours later, Israel's Minister of Defense, Moshe Dayan, "gave the order to go into action against Syria.) without consultation or government authorization.

The Syrian army consisted of about 75,000 men grouped in nine brigades, supported by an adequate amount of artillery and armor. Israeli forces used in combat consisted of two brigades (the 8th Armored Brigade and the Golani Brigade) in the northern part of the front at Givat HaEm, and another two (infantry and one of Peled's brigades summoned from Jenin) in the center. The Golan Heights' unique terrain (mountainous slopes crossed by parallel streams every several kilometers running east to west), and the general lack of roads in the area channeled both forces along east–west axes of movement and restricted the ability of units to support those on either flank. Thus the Syrians could move north–south on the plateau itself, and the Israelis could move north–south at the base of the Golan escarpment. An advantage Israel possessed was the intelligence collected by Mossad operative Eli Cohen (who was captured and executed in Syria in 1965) regarding the Syrian battle positions. Syria had built extensive defensive fortifications in depths up to 15 kilometers.

As opposed to all the other campaigns, IAF was only partially effective in the Golan because the fixed fortifications were so effective. The Syrian forces proved unable to put up effective defense largely because the officers were poor leaders and treated their soldiers badly; often officers would retreat from danger, leaving their men confused and ineffective. The Israelis also had the upper hand during close combat that took place in the numerous Syrian bunkers along the Golan Heights, as they were armed with the Uzi, a submachine gun designed for close combat, while Syrian soldiers were armed with the heavier AK-47 assault rifle, designed for combat in more open areas.

==== Israeli attack: first day (9 June) ====
Israeli tanks advancing on the Golan Heights. June 1967

On the morning of 9 June, Israeli jets began carrying out dozens of sorties against Syrian positions from Mount Hermon to Tawfiq, using rockets salvaged from captured Egyptian stocks. The airstrikes knocked out artillery batteries and storehouses and forced transport columns off the roads. The Syrians suffered heavy casualties and a drop in morale, with some senior officers and troops deserting. The attacks also provided time as Israeli forces cleared paths through Syrian minefields. The airstrikes did not seriously damage the Syrians' bunkers and trench systems, and the bulk of Syrian forces on the Golan remained in their positions.

About two hours after the airstrikes began, the 8th Armored Brigade, led by Colonel Albert Mandler, advanced into the Golan Heights from Givat HaEm. Its advance was spearheaded by Engineering Corps sappers and eight bulldozers, which cleared away barbed wire and mines. As they advanced, the force came under fire, and five bulldozers were immediately hit. The Israeli tanks, with their manoeuvrability sharply reduced by the terrain, advanced slowly under fire toward the fortified village of Sir al-Dib, with their ultimate objective being the fortress at Qala. Israeli casualties steadily mounted.

Part of the attacking force lost its way and emerged opposite Za'ura, a redoubt manned by Syrian reservists. With the situation critical, Colonel Mandler ordered simultaneous assaults on Za'ura and Qala. Heavy and confused fighting followed, with Israeli and Syrian tanks struggling around obstacles and firing at extremely short ranges. Mandler recalled that "the Syrians fought well and bloodied us. We beat them only by crushing them under our treads and by blasting them with our cannons at very short range, from 100 to 500 meters." The first three Israeli tanks to enter Qala were stopped by a Syrian bazooka team, and a relief column of seven Syrian tanks arrived to repel the attackers.

The Israelis took heavy fire from the houses, but could not turn back, as other forces were advancing behind them, and they were on a narrow path with mines on either side. The Israelis continued pressing forward and called for air support. A pair of Israeli jets destroyed two of the Syrian tanks, and the remainder withdrew. The surviving defenders of Qala retreated after their commander was killed. Meanwhile, Za'ura fell in an Israeli assault, and the Israelis also captured the 'Ein Fit fortress.

In the central sector, the Israeli 181st Battalion captured the strongholds of Dardara and Tel Hillal after fierce fighting. Desperate fighting also broke out along the operation's northern axis, where Golani Brigade attacked thirteen Syrian positions, including the formidable Tel Fakhr position. Navigational errors placed the Israelis directly under the Syrians' guns. In the fighting that followed, both sides took heavy casualties, with the Israelis losing all nineteen of their tanks and half-tracks. The Israeli battalion commander then ordered his twenty-five remaining men to dismount, divide into two groups, and charge the northern and southern flanks of Tel Fakhr. The first Israelis to reach the perimeter of the southern approach laid on the barbed wire, allowing their comrades to vault over them. From there, they assaulted the fortified Syrian positions. The fighting was waged at extremely close quarters, often hand-to-hand.

On the northern flank, the Israelis broke through within minutes and cleared out the trenches and bunkers. During the seven-hour battle, the Israelis lost 31 dead and 82 wounded, while the Syrians lost 62 dead and 20 captured. Among the dead was the Israeli battalion commander. The Golani Brigade's 51st Battalion took Tel 'Azzaziat, and Darbashiya also fell to Israeli forces.

A Universal Newsreel from 9 June about the war and UN reactions.

By the evening of 9 June, the four Israeli brigades had all broken through to the plateau, where they could be reinforced and replaced. Thousands of reinforcements began reaching the front, those tanks and half-tracks that had survived the previous day's fighting were refuelled and replenished with ammunition, and the wounded were evacuated. By dawn, the Israelis had eight brigades in the sector.

Syria's first line of defense had been shattered, but the defenses beyond that remained largely intact. Mount Hermon and the Banias in the north, and the entire sector between Tawfiq and Customs House Road in the south remained in Syrian hands. In a meeting early on the night of 9 June, Syrian leaders decided to reinforce those positions as quickly as possible and to maintain a steady barrage on Israeli civilian settlements.

==== Israeli attack: second day (10 June) ====
Throughout the night, the Israelis continued their advance, though it was slowed by fierce resistance. An anticipated Syrian counterattack never materialized. At the fortified village of Jalabina, a garrison of Syrian reservists, levelling their anti-aircraft guns, held off the Israeli 65th Paratroop Battalion for four hours before a small detachment managed to penetrate the village and knock out the heavy guns.

Meanwhile, the 8th Brigade's tanks moved south from Qala, advancing 6 miles (9.7 km) to Wasit under heavy artillery and tank bombardment. At the Banias in the north, Syrian mortar batteries opened fire on advancing Israeli forces only after Golani Brigade sappers had cleared a path through a minefield, killing 16 Israeli soldiers and wounding four.

On the next day, 10 June, the central and northern groups joined in a pincer movement on the plateau, but that fell mainly on empty territory as the Syrian forces retreated. At 8:30 a.m., the Syrians began blowing up their own bunkers, burning documents and retreating. Several units joined by Elad Peled's troops climbed to the Golan from the south, only to find the positions mostly empty. When the 8th Brigade reached Mansura, 5 miles (8.0 km) from Wasit, the Israelis met no opposition and found abandoned equipment, including tanks, in perfect working condition. In the fortified Banias village, Golani Brigade troops found only several Syrian soldiers chained to their positions.

During the day, the Israeli units stopped after obtaining manoeuvre room between their positions and a line of volcanic hills to the west. In some locations, Israeli troops advanced after an agreed-upon ceasefire to occupy strategically strong positions. To the east, the ground terrain is an open gently sloping plain. This position later became the ceasefire line known as the "Purple Line".

Time magazine reported: "In an effort to pressure the United Nations into enforcing a ceasefire, Damascus Radio undercut its own army by broadcasting the fall of the city of Quneitra three hours before it actually capitulated. That premature report of the surrender of their headquarters destroyed the morale of the Syrian troops left in the Golan area."

== Conclusion ==
A week ago, the fateful campaign began. The existence of the State of Israel hung in the balance, the hopes of generations, and the vision that was realised in our own time... During the fighting, our forces destroyed about 450 enemy planes and hundreds of tanks. The enemy forces were decisively defeated in battles. Many fled for their lives or were captured. For the first time since the establishment of the state, the threat to our security has been removed at once from the Sinai Peninsula, the Gaza Strip, Jerusalem, the West Bank and the northern border.

— Levi Eshkol, 12 June 1967 (Address to Israeli Parliament)

A Universal Newsreel from 13 June about the war

By 10 June, Israel had completed its final offensive in the Golan Heights, and a ceasefire was signed the next day. Israel had seized the Gaza Strip, the Sinai Peninsula, the West Bank of the Jordan River (including East Jerusalem), and the Golan Heights. About a million Arabs were placed under Israel's direct control in the newly captured territories. Israel's strategic depth grew by at least 300 kilometers in the south, 60 kilometers in the east, and 20 kilometers of extremely rugged terrain in the north, a security asset that proved useful in the Yom Kippur War six years later.

Speaking three weeks after the war ended, as he accepted an honorary degree from Hebrew University, Yitzhak Rabin gave his reasoning behind the success of Israel:

Our airmen, who struck the enemies' planes so accurately that no one in the world understands how it was done and people seek technological explanations or secret weapons; our armoured troops who beat the enemy even when their equipment was inferior to his; our soldiers in all other branches ... who overcame our enemies everywhere, despite the latter's superior numbers and fortifications—all these revealed not only coolness and courage in the battle but ... an understanding that only their personal stand against the greatest dangers would achieve victory for their country and for their families, and that if victory was not theirs the alternative was annihilation.

In recognition of contributions, Rabin was given the honor of naming the war for the Israelis. From the suggestions proposed, including the "War of Daring", "War of Salvation", and "War of the Sons of Light", he "chose the least ostentatious, the Six-Day War, evoking the days of creation".

Dayan's final report on the war to the Israeli general staff listed several shortcomings in Israel's actions, including misinterpretation of Nasser's intentions, overdependence on the United States, and reluctance to act when Egypt closed the Straits. He also credited several factors for Israel's success: Egypt did not appreciate the advantage of striking first and their adversaries did not accurately gauge Israel's strength and its willingness to use it.

In Egypt, according to Heikal, Nasser had admitted his responsibility for the military defeat in June 1967. According to historian Abd al-Azim Ramadan, Nasser's mistaken decisions to expel the international peacekeeping force from the Sinai Peninsula and close the Straits of Tiran in 1967 led to a state of war with Israel, despite Egypt's lack of military preparedness.

After the 1973 Yom Kippur War, Egypt reviewed the causes of its loss of the 1967 war. Issues that were identified included "the individualistic bureaucratic leadership"; "promotions on the basis of loyalty, not expertise, and the army's fear of telling Nasser the truth"; lack of intelligence; and better Israeli weapons, command, organization, and will to fight.

=== Casualties and Losses ===
Between 776 and 983 Israelis were killed and 4,517 were wounded. Fifteen Israeli soldiers were captured. Arab casualties were far greater. Between 9,800 and 15,000 Egyptian soldiers were listed as killed or missing in action. An additional 4,338 Egyptian soldiers were captured. Jordanian losses are estimated to be 700 killed in action with another 2,500 wounded. The Syrians were estimated to have sustained between 1,000 and 2,500 killed in action. Between 367 and 591 Syrians were captured.

Casualties were also suffered by UNEF, the United Nations Emergency Force that was stationed on the Egyptian side of the border. In three different episodes, Israeli forces attacked a UNEF convoy, camps in which UNEF personnel were concentrated and the UNEF headquarters in Gaza, resulting in one Brazilian peacekeeper and 14 Indian officials killed by Israeli forces, with an additional seventeen peacekeepers wounded in both contingents.

Regarding material losses, 46 Israeli aircraft and 400 tanks were destroyed. Egyptian losses were reported at 700 tanks according to President Nasser, although Israeli officials claimed to have destroyed 509 Egyptian tanks. Egyptian aircraft losses range from 282 to 350. Syria lost close to 60 aircraft. Jordanian losses accounted to 21, including 17 military aircraft, 1 helicopter and 3 passenger aircraft. Iraq lost 9 aircraft; Lebanon lost one.

== Controversies ==
=== Preemptive war or war of aggression ===
When hostilities began, Egypt and Israel both announced that they had been attacked by the other. The Israeli government later abandoned its initial position, acknowledging Israel had struck first and calling the attack a preemptive move to prevent an anticipated invasion by Egypt. The Arab view was that it was unjustified to attack Egypt. Many scholars consider the war a case of preventative war as a form of self-defense. Others have assessed it as a war of aggression.

=== Allegations of atrocities committed against Egyptian soldiers ===
It has been alleged that Nasser did not want Egypt to learn of the true extent of his defeat and so ordered the killing of Egyptian army stragglers making their way back to the Suez canal zone. Both Israeli and Egyptian sources have also alleged that Israeli troops killed unarmed Egyptian prisoners.

=== Allegations of military support from the US, UK and Soviet Union ===
It has been alleged that the US and the UK gave Israel direct military support during the war, including the supply of equipment (despite an embargo) and the participation of US forces in the conflict. Many of these allegations and conspiracy theories have been disputed and it has been claimed that some were given currency in the Arab world to explain the Arab defeat. It has also been claimed that the Soviet Union, in support of its Arab allies, used its naval strength in the Mediterranean as a major restraint on the US Navy.

The US features prominently in Arab conspiracy theories purporting to explain the June 1967 defeat. Mohamed Hassanein Heikal, a confidant of Nasser, claims that President Lyndon B. Johnson was obsessed with Nasser and conspired with Israel to bring him down. The reported Israeli troop movements seemed all the more threatening because they were perceived in the context of a US conspiracy against Egypt. Salah Bassiouny of the Foreign Ministry claims it saw the reported Israeli troop movements as credible because Israel had reached the level at which it could find strategic alliance with the United States.

During the war, Cairo announced that American and British planes were participating in the Israeli attack. Nasser broke off diplomatic relations following this allegation. Nasser's image of the United States was such that he might well have believed the worst. Anwar Sadat implied that Nasser used this deliberate conspiracy in order to accuse the United States as a political cover-up for domestic consumption. Lutfi Abd al-Qadir, the director of Radio Cairo during the late 1960s, who accompanied Nasser to his visits in Moscow, theorized that both the Soviets and the Western powers wanted to topple Nasser or to reduce his influence.

=== USS Liberty incident ===
On 8 June 1967, Israeli jets and torpedo boats attacked the USS Liberty, a United States Navy electronic intelligence vessel sailing 13 nautical miles (24 km) off Arish (just outside Egypt's territorial waters), nearly sinking the ship, killing 34 sailors and wounding 171. Israel said it had misidentified the ship as the Egyptian vessel El Quseir, apologized for the mistake, and paid compensation to the victims or their families and to the US for damage to the ship. After an investigation, the US accepted Israel's explanation and the issue was closed by the exchange of diplomatic notes in 1987. Others, including United States Secretary of State Dean Rusk and Chief of Naval Operations Admiral Thomas Moorer, some survivors of the attack, and intelligence officials familiar with transcripts of intercepted signals on the day, have rejected these conclusions as unsatisfactory and maintain that the attack was made in the knowledge that the ship was American.

== Aftermath ==
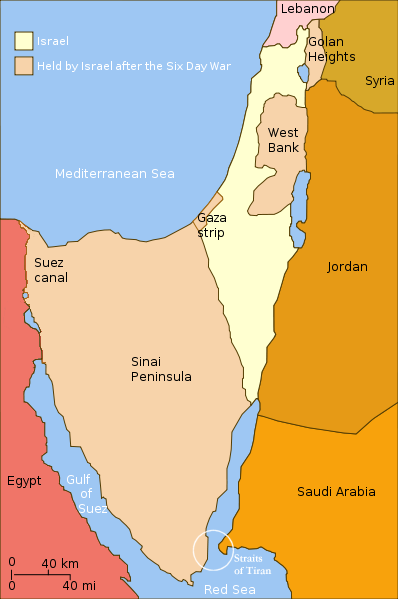
Israel and the territories Israel occupied in the Six Day War

The Six-Day War's political importance was immense. Israel demonstrated again that it was able and willing to initiate strategic strikes that could change the regional balance. Egypt and Syria learned tactical lessons and launched an attack in 1973 in an attempt to reclaim their lost territories.

After following other Arab nations in declaring war, Mauritania remained in a declared state of war with Israel until about 1999. The US imposed an embargo on new arms agreements to all Middle East countries, including Israel, that remained in force until the end of 1967, despite urgent Israeli requests to lift it.

=== Exodus of Arabs from Israeli-occupied territories ===
Populations in the occupied territories were extensively displaced: of about one million Palestinians in the West Bank and Gaza, 280,000 to 325,000 were displaced from their homes. Most of them settled in Jordan. The other 700,000 remained. In the Golan Heights, over 100,000 fled. Israel allowed only the inhabitants of East Jerusalem and the Golan Heights to receive full Israeli citizenship, applying its law, administration and jurisdiction to these territories in 1967 and 1981, respectively. The vast majority of the populations in both territories declined to take citizenship.

In his 1999 book Righteous Victims, Israeli "New Historian" Benny Morris writes:

In three villages southwest of Jerusalem and at Qalqilya, houses were destroyed "not in battle, but as punishment ... and in order to chase away the inhabitants ... contrary to government ... policy," Dayan wrote in his memoirs. In Qalqilya, about a third of the homes were razed and about 12,000 inhabitants were evicted, though many then camped out in the environs. The evictees in both areas were allowed to stay and later were given cement and tools by the Israeli authorities to rebuild at least some of their dwellings.

But many thousands of other Palestinians now took to the roads. Perhaps as many as seventy thousand, mostly from the Jericho area, fled during the fighting; tens of thousands more left over the following months. Altogether, about one-quarter of the population of the West Bank, about 200–250,000 people, went into exile. ... They simply walked to the Jordan River crossings and made their way on foot to the East Bank. It is unclear how many were intimidated or forced out by the Israeli troops and how many left voluntarily, in panic and fear. There is some evidence of IDF soldiers going around with loudspeakers ordering West Bankers to leave their homes and cross the Jordan. Some left because they had relatives or sources of livelihood on the East Bank and feared being permanently cut off.

Thousands of Arabs were taken by bus from East Jerusalem to the Allenby Bridge, though there is no evidence of coercion. The free Israeli-organized transportation, which began on June 11, 1967, went on for about a month. At the bridge, they had to sign a document stating that they were leaving of their own free will. Perhaps as many as 70,000 people emigrated from the Gaza Strip to Egypt and elsewhere in the Arab world.

On July 2, the Israeli government announced that it would allow the return of those 1967 refugees who desired to do so, but no later than August 10, later extended to September 13. The Jordanian authorities probably pressured many of the refugees, who constituted an enormous burden, to sign up to return. In practice only 14,000 of the 120,000 who applied were allowed by Israel back into the West Bank by the beginning of September. After that, only a trickle of "special cases" were allowed back, perhaps 3,000 in all. (328–29)

In addition, between 80,000 and 110,000 Syrians fled the Golan Heights, of whom about 20,000 were from the city of Quneitra. According to research by Haaretz, a total of 130,000 Syrian inhabitants fled or were expelled from the territory, most of them pushed out by the Israeli army.

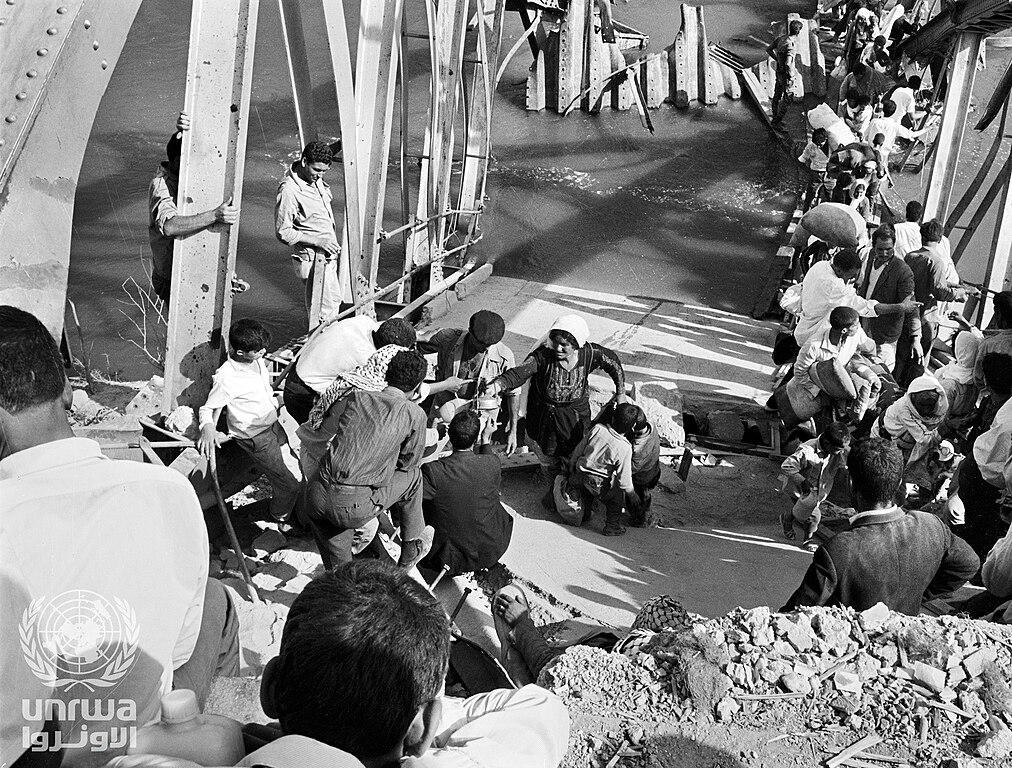
Palestine refugees flee across the Allenby Bridge

Palestine refugees flee across the Allenby Bridge

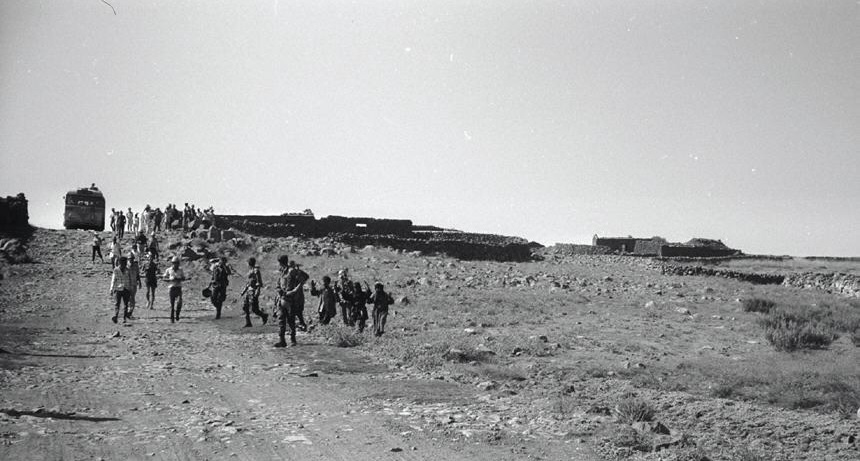
Syrian civilians with their hands raised being expelled from the Golan Heights by Israeli soldiers

=== Israel and Zionism ===
After the war, Israel experienced a wave of national euphoria, and the press praised the military's performance for weeks. New "victory coins" were minted to celebrate. The world's interest in Israel grew, and its economy, which had been in crisis before the war, flourished due to an influx of tourists and donations, as well as the extraction of oil from the Sinai's wells. The aftermath of the war also saw a baby boom that lasted four years.

The war's aftermath also had religious significance. Under Jordanian rule, Jews were expelled from Jerusalem and effectively barred from visiting the Western Wall, despite Article VIII of the 1949 Armistice Agreement, which required making arrangements for Israeli Jewish access to it. Jewish holy sites were not maintained and Jewish cemeteries had been desecrated. After the annexation to Israel, each religious group was granted administration over its holy sites. For the first time since 1948, Jews could visit the Old City of Jerusalem and pray at the Western Wall, the holiest site where Jews are permitted to pray, an event celebrated every year on Yom Yerushalayim.

The Temple Mount, home to the Al-Aqsa compound, is the holiest site in Jewish tradition, but has been under sole administration of the Jordanian Muslim Waqf, and Jews are barred from praying there, though they are allowed to visit. In Hebron, Jews gained access to the Cave of the Patriarchs – the second-holiest site in Judaism – for the first time since the 14th century (previously Jews were allowed to pray only at the entrance). Other Jewish holy sites, such as Rachel's Tomb in Bethlehem and Joseph's Tomb in Nablus, also became accessible.

The war inspired the Jewish diaspora, which was swept up in overwhelming support for Israel. According to Michael Oren, the war enabled American Jews to "walk with their backs straight and flex their political muscle as never before. American Jewish organizations which had previously kept Israel at arm's length suddenly proclaimed their Zionism." Thousands of Jewish immigrants arrived from Western countries such as the United States, United Kingdom, Canada, France and South Africa after the war. Many of them returned to their countries of origin after a few years; one survey found that 58% of American Jews who immigrated to Israel between 1961 and 1972 returned to the United States. Nevertheless, immigration to Israel of Jews from Western countries, which was previously only a trickle, was a significant force for the first time.

Most notably, the war stirred Zionist passions among Jews in the Soviet Union, who by that time had been forcibly assimilated. Many Soviet Jews applied for exit visas and began protesting for their right to immigrate to Israel. After diplomatic pressure from the West, the Soviet government began granting Jews exit visas in growing numbers. From 1970 to 1988, some 291,000 Soviet Jews were granted exit visas, of whom 165,000 immigrated to Israel and 126,000 to the United States. The great rise in Jewish pride in the wake of Israel's victory also fueled the beginnings of the baal teshuva movement, the return of secular Jews to religious Judaism. The war gave impetus to a campaign in which the leader of the Hasidic Lubavitch movement directed his male followers around the world to wear tefillin (small leather boxes) during morning prayers.

=== Jews in Arab countries ===
In the Arab nations, populations of minority Jews faced persecution and expulsion following the Israeli victory, contributing to the Jewish exodus from Arab lands, which had been ongoing since 1948. As a result, Jewish populations in Arab countries further diminished as many Jews emigrated to Israel and other Western countries. According to historian and ambassador Michael Oren:

Mobs attacked Jewish neighborhoods in Egypt, Yemen, Lebanon, Tunisia, and Morocco, burning synagogues and assaulting residents. A pogrom in Tripoli, Libya, left 18 Jews dead and 25 injured; the survivors were herded into detention centers. Of Egypt's 4,000 Jews, 800 were arrested, including the chief rabbis of both Cairo and Alexandria, and their property sequestered by the government. The ancient communities of Damascus and Baghdad were placed under house arrest, their leaders imprisoned and fined. A total of 7,000 Jews were expelled, many with merely a satchel.

=== Antisemitism in Communist countries ===
After the war, a series of antisemitic purges began in Communist countries. Some 11,200 Jews from Poland immigrated to Israel during the 1968 Polish political crisis and in 1969.

=== War of Attrition ===
After the war, Egypt initiated clashes along the Suez Canal in what became known as the War of Attrition.

=== Palestinian terrorism ===
As a result of Israel's victory, Palestinian leadership concluded that the Arab world could not defeat Israel in open warfare, which in turn led to an increase in terrorist attacks with an international reach. The Palestine Liberation Organization (PLO) had been established in 1964 and became more active after the Six-Day War; its actions gave credibility to those who claimed that only terror could end Israel's existence. The Popular Front for the Liberation of Palestine also emerged after the war, with its leader, George Habash, speaking of turning the occupied territories into an "inferno whose fires consume the usurpers". These events led to a series of hijackings, bombings, and kidnappings that culminated in the massacre of Israeli athletes during the 1972 Munich Olympics.

=== Peace and diplomacy ===
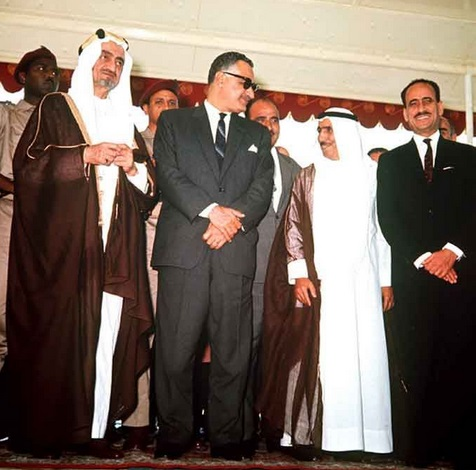
Some of the attending heads of state at the Arab League Summit in Khartoum following the Six-Day War. From left to right: Faisal of Saudi Arabia, Gamal Abdel Nasser of Egypt, Abdullah al-Sallal of Yemen, Sabah Al-Salim Al-Sabah of Kuwait and Abd al-Rahman Arif of Iraq, 2 September 1967

After the war, Israel made an offer for peace that included the return of most of the recently captured territories. According to Chaim Herzog:

On June 19, 1967, the National Unity Government [of Israel] voted unanimously to return the Sinai to Egypt and the Golan Heights to Syria in return for peace agreements. The Golan would have to be demilitarized, and special arrangement would be negotiated for the Straits of Tiran. The government also resolved to open negotiations with King Hussein of Jordan regarding the Eastern border.

The 19 June Israeli cabinet decision did not include the Gaza Strip and left open the possibility of Israel permanently acquiring parts of the West Bank. On 25–27 June, Israel incorporated East Jerusalem together with areas of the West Bank to the north and south into Jerusalem's new municipal boundaries.

The Israeli decision was to be conveyed to the Arab nations by the United States. The U.S. was informed of the decision, but not that it was to transmit it. There is no evidence of receipt from Egypt or Syria, and some historians claim that they may never have received the offer.

In September, the Khartoum Arab Summit resolved that there would be "no peace, no recognition and no negotiation with Israel". Avraham Sela notes that the Khartoum conference effectively marked a shift in the perception of the conflict by the Arab states away from one centered on the question of Israel's legitimacy toward one focused on territories and boundaries. This was shown on 22 November, when Egypt and Jordan accepted United Nations Security Council Resolution 242. Nasser forestalled any movement toward direct negotiations with Israel. In dozens of speeches and statements, he said that any direct peace talks with Israel were tantamount to surrender.

After the war, the entire Soviet bloc of Eastern Europe except Romania broke off diplomatic relations with Israel.

Mao-era China contended that the Arab defeat in the Six-Day War demonstrated that only people's war, not other strategies or methods, could defeat imperialism in the Middle East.

The Six-Day War laid the foundation for future discord in the region, as the Arab states resented Israel's victory and did not want to give up territory.

On 22 November 1967, the United Nations Security Council adopted Resolution 242, the "land for peace" formula, which called for Israeli withdrawal "from territories occupied" in 1967 and "the termination of all claims or states of belligerency". Resolution 242 recognized the right of "every state in the area to live in peace within secure and recognized boundaries free from threats or acts of force". Israel returned the Sinai to Egypt in 1978, after the Camp David Accords. In 2005, Israel withdrew all military forces and evacuated all civilians from the Gaza Strip. Its army frequently reenters Gaza for military operations and retains control of the seaports, airports and most of the border crossings.

=== Long term ===
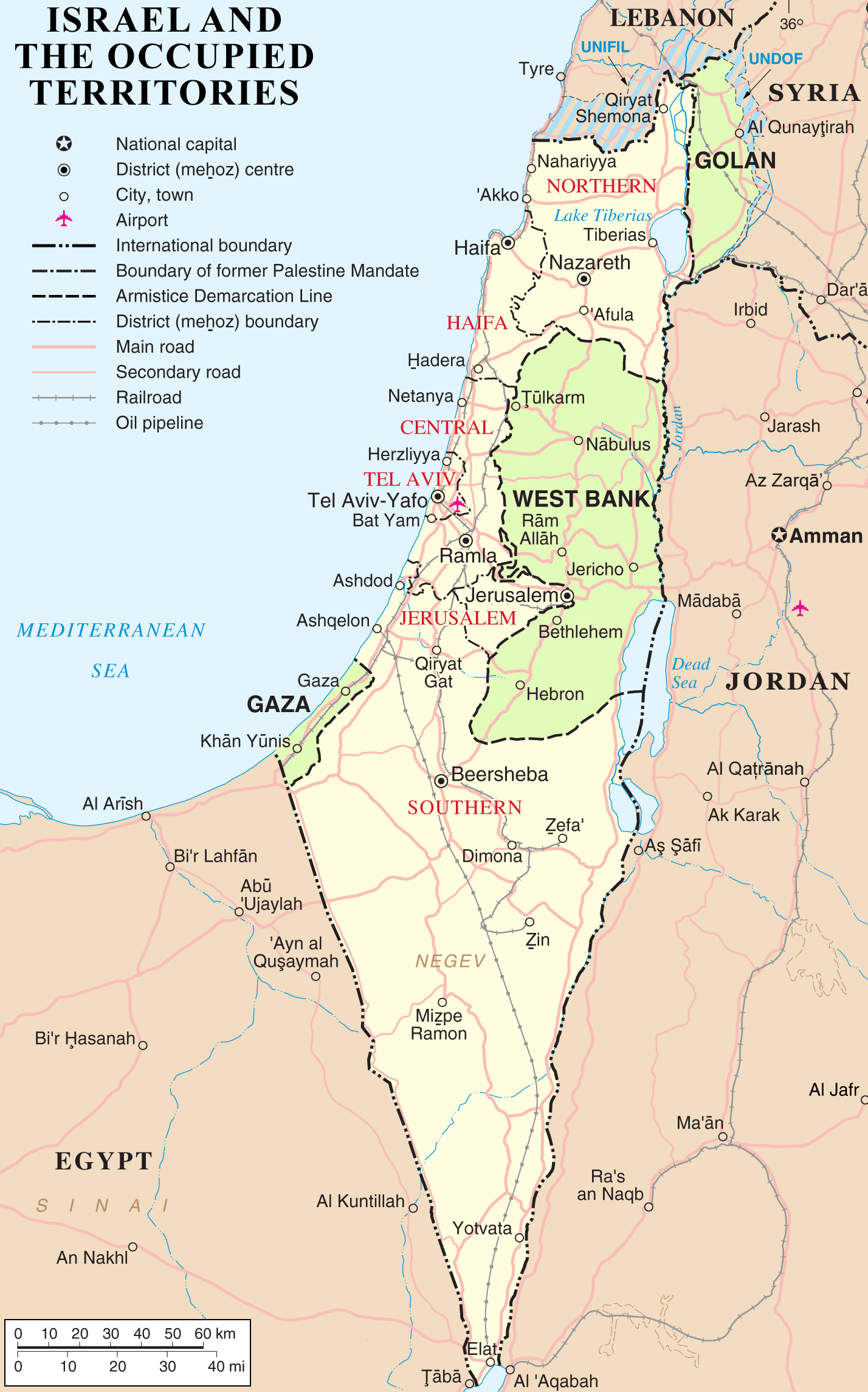
During the Six-Day War Israel captured the West Bank, the Gaza Strip, the Golan Heights.

Israel made peace with Egypt after the Camp David Accords of 1978 and completed a staged withdrawal from the Sinai in 1982. The position of the other occupied territories has for decades been a bitter cause of conflict between Israel and the Palestinians and the Arab world in general. Jordan and Egypt eventually withdrew their claims to sovereignty over the West Bank and Gaza, respectively. Israel and Jordan signed a peace treaty in 1994.

After the Israeli occupation of these territories, the Gush Emunim movement launched a large settlement effort in these areas to secure a permanent foothold. There are now hundreds of thousands of Israeli settlers in the West Bank. They are a matter of controversy within Israel, both among the general population and within different political administrations, supporting them to varying degrees. Palestinians consider them a provocation. The Israeli settlements in Gaza were evacuated in August 2005 as a part of Israel's disengagement from Gaza.

== See also ==
- 1967–1971 Gazan insurgency, a low–level conflict in the Gaza Strip after the Six-Day War
- Catch 67, a 2017 Israeli philosophy book on the West Bank occupation that launched a public dialogue on the war's 50th anniversary
- Abba Eban, Israeli Foreign Minister
- Israeli MIAs
- Ras Sedr massacre
- Syrian towns and villages depopulated in the Arab–Israeli conflict
