= Gidi Pass =

Landform on Egypt's Sinai Peninsula

Coordinates: 30°13′N 33°10′E

Gidi Pass (Arabic: ممر جدي) is a strategically important pass in the Sinai. It is about 29 km (18 mi) long.

When Israel began a withdrawal from the Sinai in 1975 Egypt constructed an electronic warning station in the Gidi Pass.
