= Battle of Tel Faher =

Former Syrian outpost in the Golan Heights

Coordinates: 33°13′28″N 35°41′32″E

- Part of Six-Day War
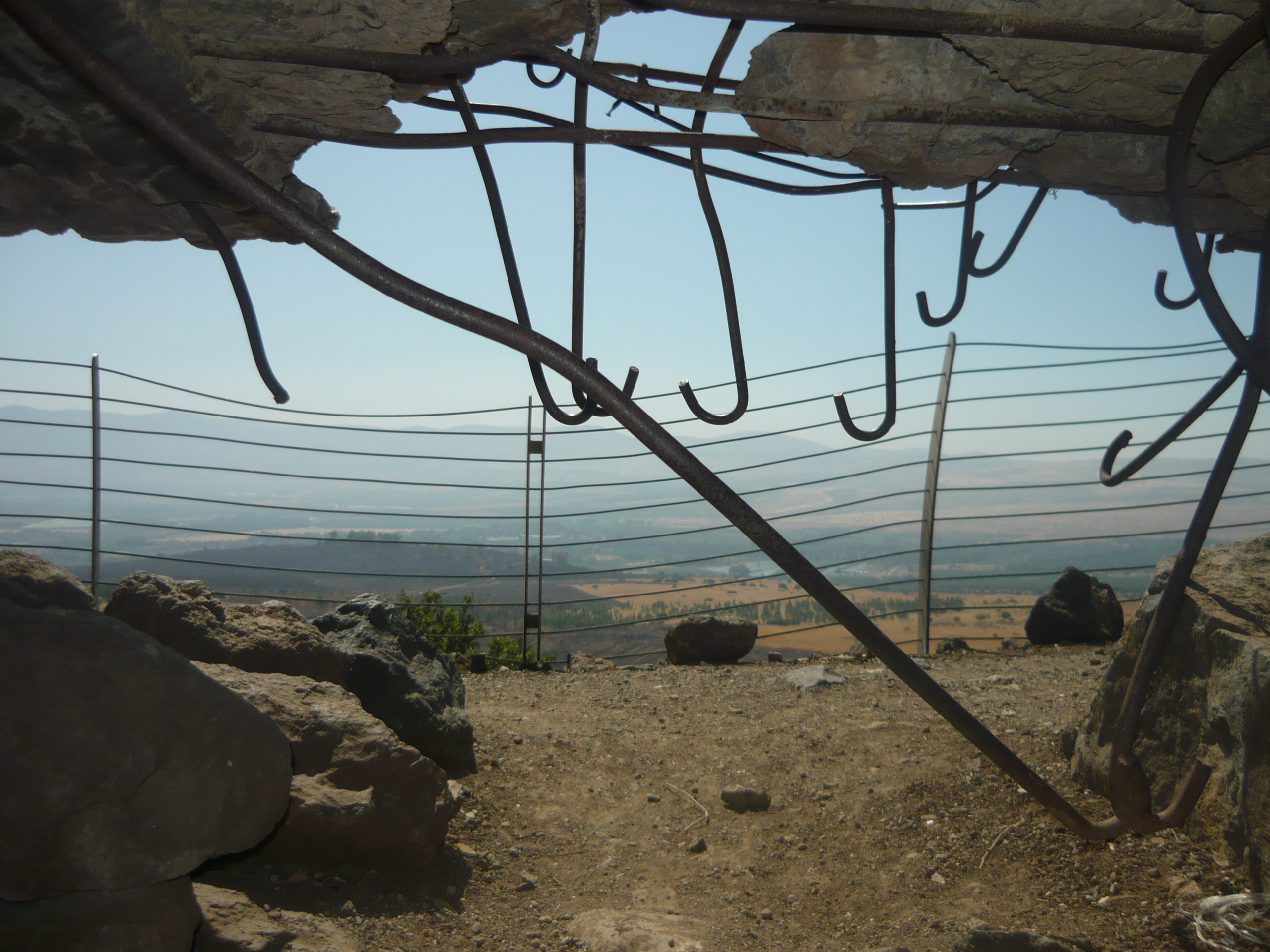
- View from inside a ruined bunker in Tel Faher
Date	June 9, 1967
Location	Northern Golan Heights
Result	Israeli victory

Belligerents
Israel	Syria

Commanders and leaders
(Israel) Yona Efrat	(Syria) Ahmad Khalili

Units involved
Golani Brigade	187th Infantry Battalion

Strength
260	Unknown

Casualties and losses
34 killed 113 wounded	62 killed 20 captured

Tel Faher or Golani Lookout is a former Syrian military outpost in the Golan Heights that has been occupied by Israel since the Six-Day War in 1967.

Tel Faher was the site of an intense battle in 1967 between the Israel Defense Forces and the Syrian Army which ended in the conquest of the outpost by the Golani Brigade.The Syrian position at Tel Faher was strongly fortified with minefields, bunkers, trenches, and barbed wire protecting it. Despite taking heavy casualties, the Israelis managed to capture Tel Faher and forced the Syrians to retreat. The fall of Tel Faher caused the Syrian defensive line in the area to collapse, and this led to Israel conquering the Golan Heights just one day later.

Tel Faher is now a park commemorating those who died in the battle.

== Name ==
Tell el-Fakhar (Arabic: تل الفخار, romanized: Tell al-Faḫḫar, lit. 'Pottery Mound') was the name of a nearby village, now abandoned (see Arabic article).

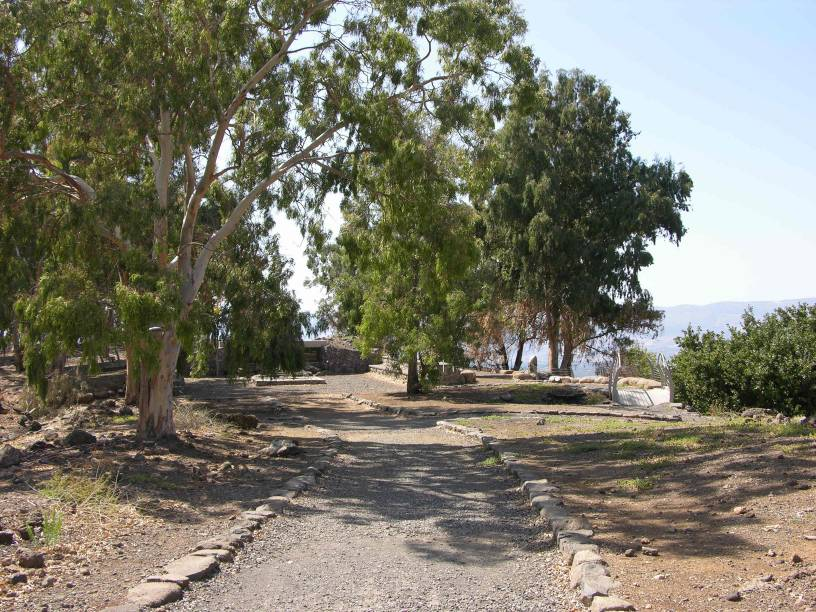
Tel Faher park

== Background ==
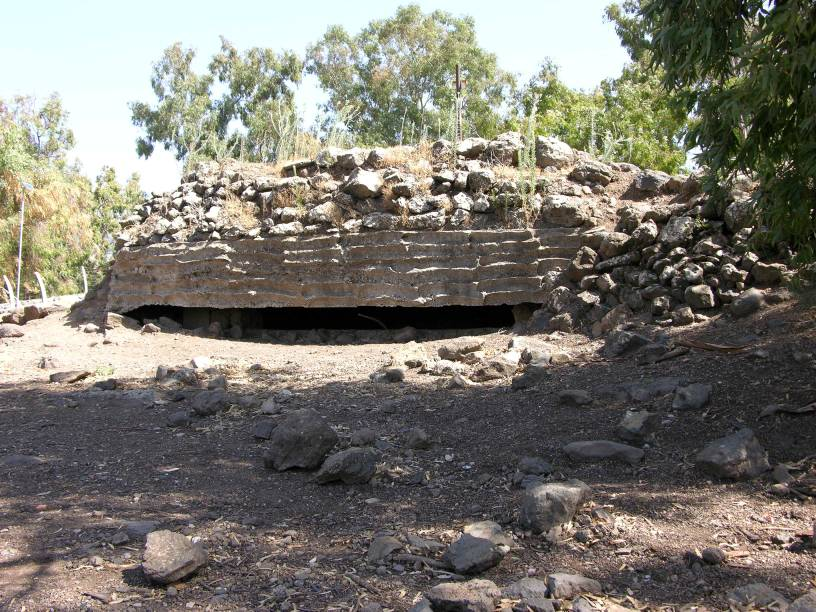
Bunker from outside

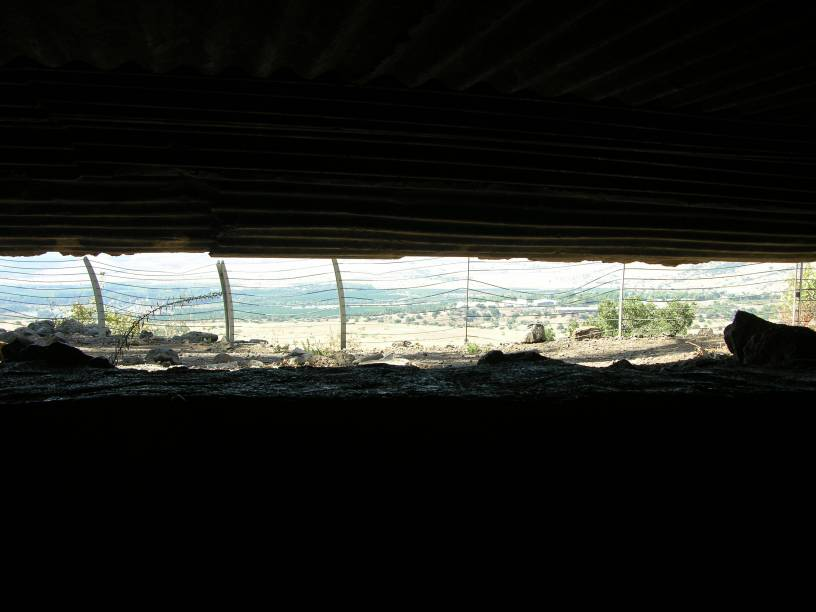
Bunker with excellent view down to the fields of the kibbutzim

The Israel-Syria front remained relatively quiet during the first four days of the Six-Day War, despite the fact that Syria's air force had been destroyed on the first day. Two Syrian artillery battalions with Soviet M46 130 mm guns and two companies with heavy mortars and dug-in German World War II Panzer IV tanks were positioned along the Golan escarpment.

Israel suffered the loss of 2 civilians and 16 more wounded. The Syrian army also hit 205 houses, 9 chicken coops, 6 barns, 2 tractor sheds, 30 tractors and 15 cars in the first four days (5-8 June).

=== Tuesday, June 6, 1967 (day 2) ===
On June 6, Syria launched three attacks against Israeli positions: at Tel Dan, Kibbutz Dan and the village of She'ar Yashuv two kilometers inside Israeli territory. The attacks probably never had the purpose of capturing ground and were easily repulsed. However, a Syrian artillery observation officer reported "The enemy appears to have suffered heavy losses and is retreating."

Despite the few casualties, the kibbutzniks (kibbutz members) had been forced to live almost permanently in underground shelters. The pressure on the Israeli government grew daily. The daily newspaper HaAretz wrote "The time has come to settle accounts with those who started it all. It is time to finish the job." While Prime Minister Levi Eshkol, himself a kibbutznik from Degania Bet, was highly sympathetic to the pleas, Defense Minister Moshe Dayan was reluctant to open multiple fronts at the same time and worried about a possible Soviet intervention on behalf of the Syrians. Haim Ber, the spokesman of the settlements in the north, called Eshkol and shouted in desperation "We're being shelled non-stop! We demand that the government free us from this nightmare!"

=== Thursday, June 8, 1967 (day 4) ===
On June 8, the Israeli Air Force (IAF) bombarded the Syrian positions on the Golan Heights throughout the day in an attempt to silence the Syrian guns and to press the Syrian government to rethink its position as Egypt and Jordan had now agreed to a cease fire.

It seemed the war was over after four days.

At 1910 hrs on Thursday evening, Eshkol tried once more to overcome Dayan's objections.

== Friday, June 9, 1967 (day 5) ==
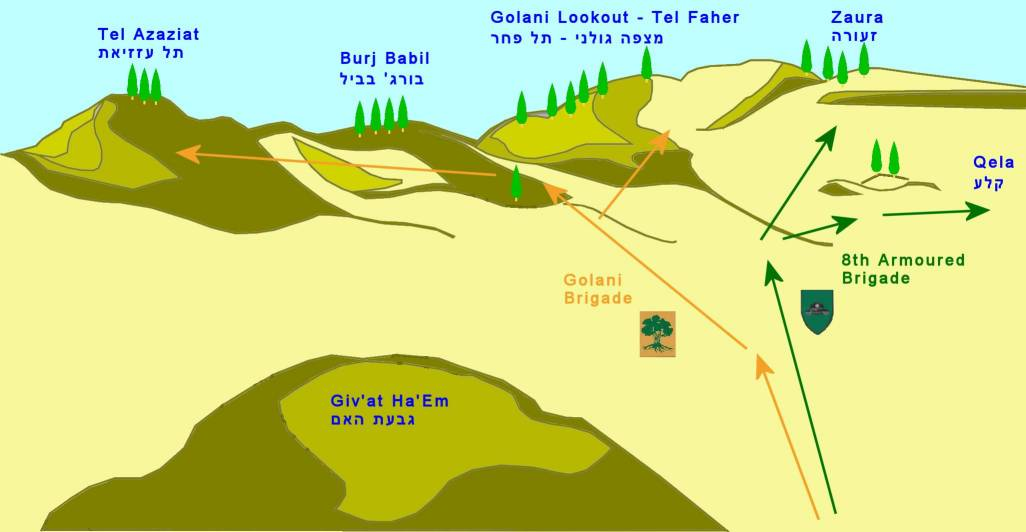
Bird's eye view of Tel Azaziat, Burj Babil, Tel Faher, Zaura

At 0600 hrs on Friday, June 9, Brig. Gen. Dado Elazar of the Northern Command was woken up by a phone call from Dayan: "Can you attack? Then attack." Dayan had changed his mind. He told his chief of staff, "If the Syrians sit quietly, I won't approve any action against them, but if in spite of all our restraint they continue shelling, I will recommend to the Cabinet that we take the entire Heights." Operation Hammer had been planned as a night attack. It was dangerous enough even in darkness, but an assault on the Golan Heights during daylight would be suicidal. The offensive was planned for 1130 hrs to give the IAF enough of time to continue its bombardment and to give the Israeli combat engineers time to create a path through enemy mine fields. Fortunately the winter rains had exposed many of the mines and the Syrians had not replaced them. The IAF was dropping some 400 tons of ordnance on the Heights from Mount Hermon in the north to Tawfiq (near Hamat Gader) in the south, including some captured rockets from Egyptian stocks.

Contrary to Syrian expectations, the IDF was not planning to launch the initial attack via the Customs House road (opposite Gadot), but where the enemy least expected it, in a large pincer movement: in the north from the Galilee Panhandle, and on the opposite side from south of the Sea of Galilee.

The 8th Armored Brigade of Colonel Albert Mandler was moved from the Sinai theatre to Kfar Szold in the northern part of the Galilee Panhandle. It had only 33 serviceable M50 and M51 Sherman tanks. Within minutes, the Syrian guns opened fire, not against the advancing troops, but still to the Israeli settlements. Of the eight armored bulldozers five never made it to the top. The Syrians started to confront them with heavy fire.

=== First breakthrough ===
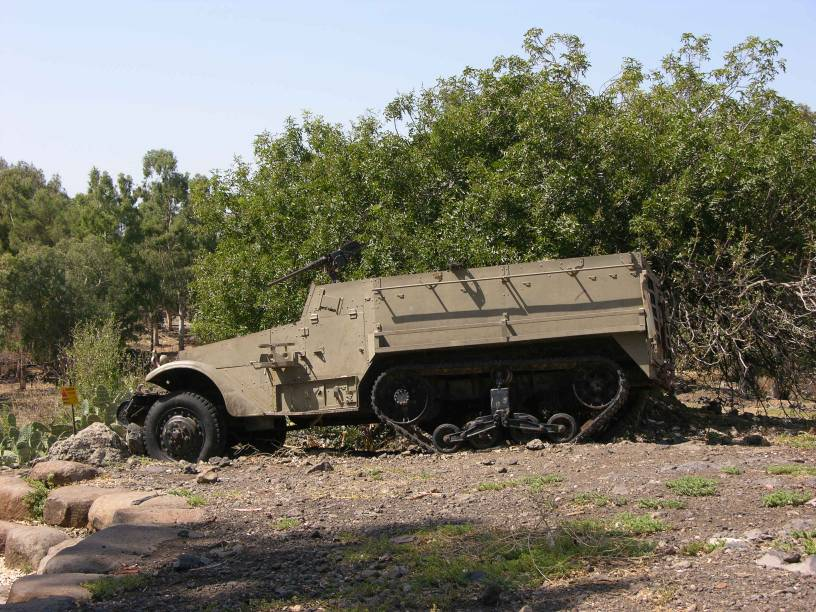
An IDF M3 Half-track at Tel Faher

A breakthrough was achieved between Givat HaEm and Tel Azaziat. Soon the tanks overran the abandoned Syrian position at Gur el Askar, shortly afterwards the strongpoint at Na'amush, while the Syrians were fleeing from the post.

Three hours after the 8th Armored Brigade began the offensive, the 1st Golani Infantry Brigade crossed the border at the same place to launch the assault on the entrenchments of Tel Faher and Tel Azaziat.

The attack on Tel Faher was difficult while the capture of Tel Azaziat was done relatively easy. The horseshoe-shaped fort was two kilometers inside the Golan Heights, protected with multiple guns, extensive mine fields and three belts of two-sided sloping fences and coiled barbed-wire. Despite the artillery bombardments the position remained relatively intact.

The leading officer found the planned climb to the rear of Tel Faher to be impassable and the battalion commander decided to continue northward. They approached the position where it was strongest instead from the rear. From a few hundred meters they came under heavy fire from Syrian tanks. Three out of nine Sherman tanks and seven out of 20 half-tracks were disabled by gunfire.

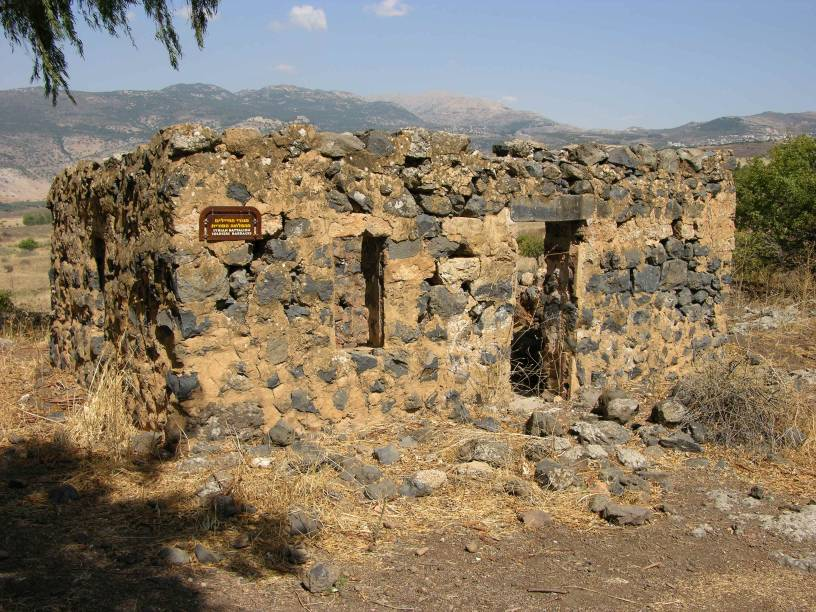
Soldiers' barracks

The internal Syrian army report showed failure in leadership, leading to chaos and desertion:

With the enemy just 700 meters away, under heavy shelling, the platoon in the front trench prepared for the battle. The platoon commander sent Private Jalil 'Issa to the company commander to request permission to take cover, but 'Issa could not find him. The platoon commander sent another runner who returned with Private Fajjar Hamdu Karnazi who reported on the company commander's disappearance. When the enemy reached 600 meters, Sgt. Muhammad Yusuf Ibrahim fired a 10-inch anti-tank gun and knocked out the lead tank. But then he and his squad commander were killed. The enemy column advanced. First Sergeant Anwar Barbar, in charge of the second 10-inch gun, could not be found. The platoon commander searched for him but unsuccessfully.... Private Hajj al-Din, who was killed just minutes later, took the gun and fired it alone, knocking out two tanks and forcing the column to retreat. But when the platoon commander tried to radio the information to headquarters, nobody answered.

=== The First Platoon Attack ===
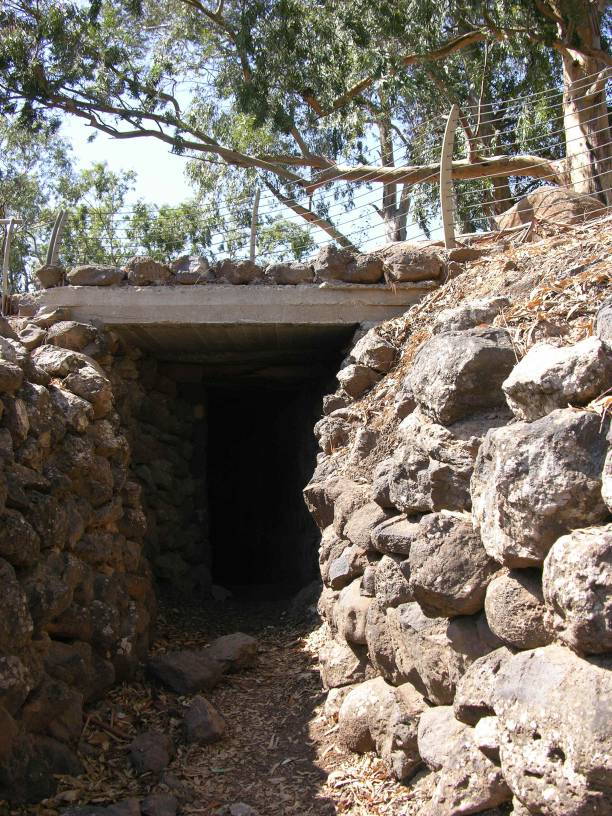
Entry to bunker

The battalion commander and the leading company with only 25 soldiers that were now separated from the rest of the battalion arrived at Tel Faher. Battalion commander, Lieutenant-Colonel Moshe "Musa" Klein, ordered the 25 Golanis, who survived the initial Syrian fire, to attack the position from two flanks.

Both the southern and northern part of Tel Faher were heavy protected with bunkers, trenches and a double row of wire. Inside waited a company of the Syrian 187th Infantry Battalion with an arsenal of anti tank guns, machine guns and 82 mm mortars. Its Syrian Captain Ahmad Khalili remembered: "It was one of our most fortified positions. It placed the Israelis directly in our crosshairs."

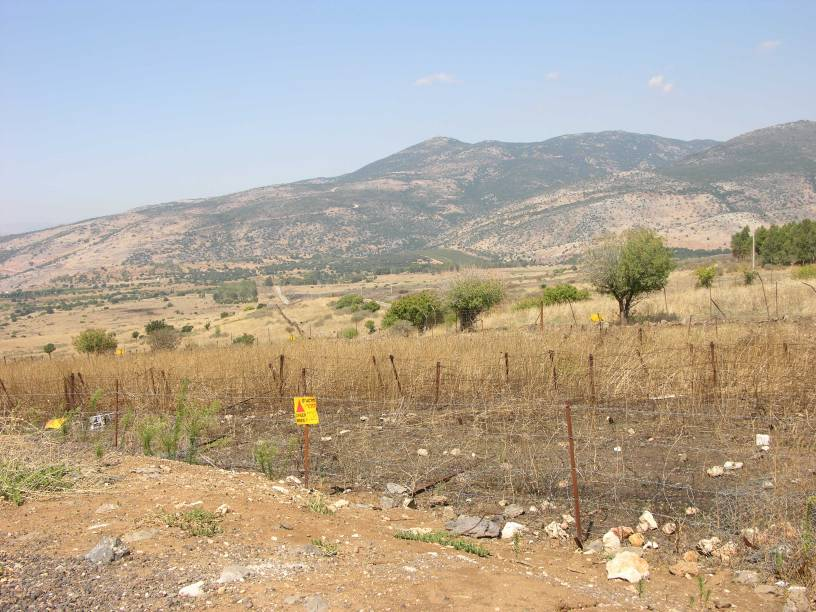
Northern flank

The Syrian commander of the northern part ordered his men not to fire until the Israelis reached the wire to catch them in a kill zone. Only minutes later, his deputy reported that "the Jews are already inside."

The battle continued for more than three hours. Of the group of 11 who fought on the southern part, 3 Israeli soldiers survived. Of the northern group of 10, only Corporal Yitzhak Hamawi survived.

"We ran, Musa (Klein) and I through the trenches. Whenever a helmet popped up, we couldn't tell it was one of ours or not. Suddenly in front of us stood a soldier whom we couldn't identify. The battalion commander shouted the password and when the soldier didn't answer, he fired a burst at him but missed. We jumped out of the trench, ran five meters and then Musa fell on his face... killed by the Syrian soldier he'd missed. Our radioman waited for him to leap up again, then shot him."

=== Company B takes Burg Babil ===
When the other surviving forces of the battalion reached under Tel Faher, the operation officer commanded Company B to take Burg-Babil a Syrian platoon post between Tel Faher and Tel Azaziat. The Syrians didn't resist and Company B returned to help the fighting in Tel Faher.

=== Brigade Reconnaissance Company Join the Battle End ===
Of the 260 Israeli soldiers that fought at Tel Faher, 34 were killed and 113 were wounded while 62 Syrians died and 20 were taken prisoner.

== Aftermath ==
The IDF had achieved most of its goals of Operation Hammer even with heavy casualties. They penetrated no deeper than 8 miles into Syrian territory, but established a five mile wide bridgehead between Zaura and Qela. They used the night of 9/10 June to regroup and resupply its forces.

At the same time the Syrian Government was pleading with other Arab countries for military support, but no assistance was forthcoming. Syria realized that they now stood alone against the IDF.

The Golan Heights had fallen in just 31 hours.

=== Medals of valor ===
The following Israeli soldiers were decorated in April 1973 with a medal of valor.

- David Shirazi (posthumously)

Private David Shirazi was part of the assault team that had to climb up the 100 m rigged slope under heavy Syrian mortar and machine gun fire to reach the barbed wire fence. Wire cutters would have taken too long. He lay himself across the wire and told his comrades to use his body as a bridge. After the last one got through he untangled himself and ran after them into the Syrian position. When the machine gunner fell wounded, he took his weapon and continued the attack until he was killed some minutes later.

- Moshe Drimmer (posthumously)

Private Moshe Drimmer belonged to a group of nine combat soldiers who had to clear the path of mines for the tanks. A few hundred meters from Tel Faher he came under heavy fire. His half-track was hit and burst into flames. Nevertheless, he turned the machine gun inside the burning vehicle towards the Syrian position and gave covering fire to his comrades. He continued firing until his vehicle was hit again and exploded.

- Natanel Horovitz

Lieutenant Natanel Horovitz was the commander of one of the three tanks that reached Qela. His commander, Lieutenant-Colonel Arye Biro, was badly wounded by splinters but continued to lead until he collapsed and had to be evacuated. He sent Natanel Horovitz to take the lead. Horovitz' company raced through the relatively weak outpost of Gur el Askar, continued towards Na'amush. There he should have been united with another company to storm Na'amush, but due to delays, he continued on his own. He successfully passed the Ukda position. Suddenly he realized that he was storming Sir Adib, which he had been trying to avoid. But he was fully engaged and had no other choice than continue his assault. Captain Yuval Ben-Arzi tried to contact Horovitz to tell him to storm Qela, but couldn't reach him, because the hatch was hit and wounded him in the head. His blood had shorted the radio intercom in his helmet. The second in command, Major Rafael Mokady was dead and several other officers dead or wounded, the battle group was at a crisis point. Only the wounded Lt. Horovitz was still advancing. In the end, he entered the enemy stronghold with just two other tanks and captured the position. Later he rose to a senior rank in the IDF.

- Shaul Vardi

Sergeant Shaul Vardi was one of the tank commanders that stormed Qela. On the way to Qela he had destroyed several fortified Syrian positions. But when his tank was hit, he got wounded in the face and was unable to see for a while. When he recovered his sight, he continued to fight. His tank was hit for a second time and this time knocked out. Armed with only Uzi SMGs and hand grenades, he and his men continued to clear Syrian positions. Only after the objective was achieved did he allow himself to be evacuated to hospital.

== Today ==
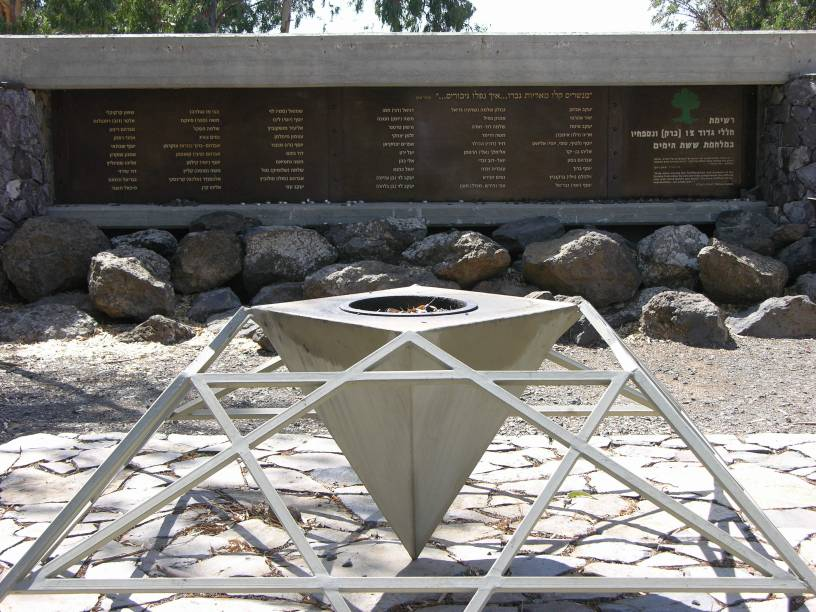
IDF memorial site

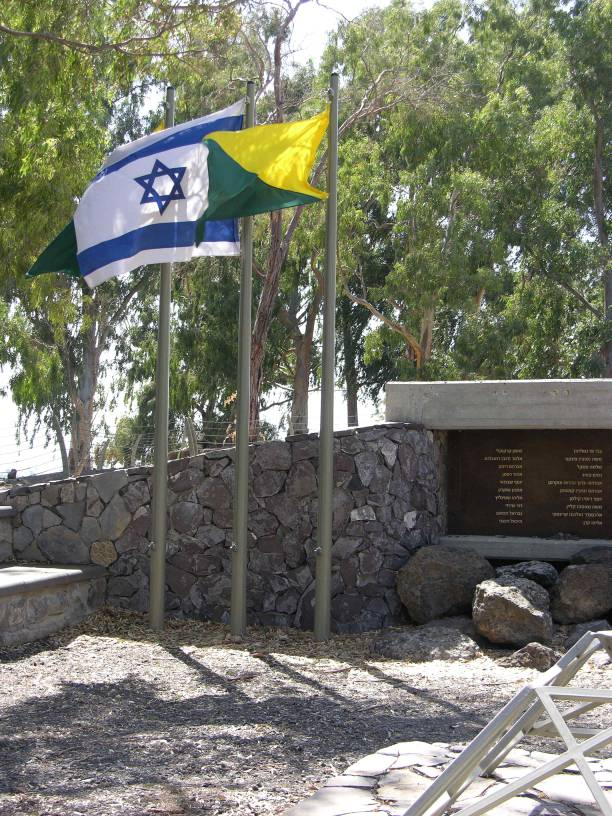
Golani Brigade flag at the memorial site

Many of the trenches and bunkers of Tel Faher are in the same condition as they were on capture. It was the 1st Golani Brigade that captured the pivotal position at a cost in casualties. The place is now called Mitzpe Golani or Golani Lookout.
