= Four Mothers (disambiguation) =

Four Mothers may refer to:

- Four Mothers, 1941 movie
- Four Mothers (Anti-war protest movement), Israeli antiwar protest movement
- Four Mothers (Judaism), a term in reference to the Biblical matriarchs Sarah, Rebecca, Leah, and Rachel
- Four Mothers Society, Native American religious and political movement
- Four Mothers (2024 film) a 2024 queer film set in Ireland
