= Kahan Commission =

Israeli investigation into the Sabra and Shatila Massacre in Lebanon

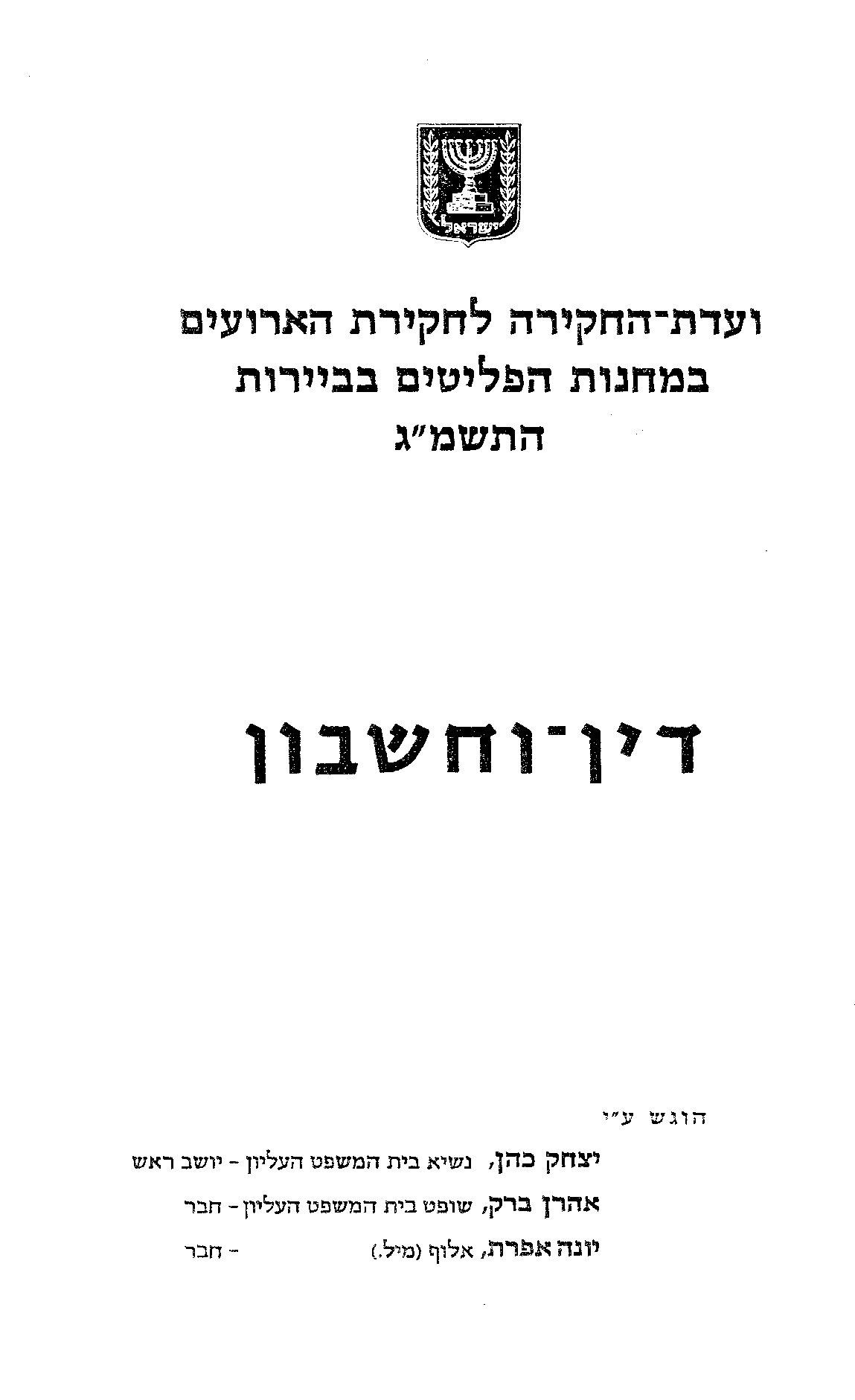
Front page of Kahan Commission report

The Kahan Commission (ועדת כהן), formally known as the Commission of Inquiry into the Events at the Refugee Camps in Beirut, was established by the Israeli government on 28 September 1982, to investigate the Sabra and Shatila massacre (16–18 September 1982). The Kahan Commission was chaired by the president of the Supreme Court, Yitzhak Kahan. Its other two members were Supreme Court Judge Aharon Barak, and Major General (reserve) Yona Efrat. The Commission was to make recommendations on Israeli involvement in the massacre through an investigation of:

[A]ll the facts and factors connected with the atrocity carried out by a unit of the Lebanese Forces against the civilian population in the Shatilla and Sabra camps.

Following a four-month investigation, on 8 February 1983, the Kahan Commission submitted its report, which was released to the public by spokesman Bezalel Gordon simultaneously in Hebrew and English. It concluded that "direct responsibility" rested with the Gemayel Phalangists led by Fadi Frem, and that no Israelis were deemed "directly responsible", although Israel was held to be "indirectly responsible".

The decision on the entry of the Phalangists into the refugee camps was taken without consideration of the danger - which the makers and executors of the decision were obligated to foresee as probable - the Phalangists would commit massacres and pogroms against the inhabitants of the camps, and without an examination of the means for preventing this danger. Similarly, it is clear from the course of events that when the reports began to arrive about the actions of the Phalangists in the camps, no proper heed was taken of these reports, the correct conclusions were not drawn from them, and no energetic and immediate action were taken to restrain the Phalangists and put a stop to their actions.

Defence Minister Ariel Sharon was found to bear "personal responsibility" for "ignoring the danger of bloodshed and revenge" and "not taking appropriate measures to prevent bloodshed". Sharon's negligence in protecting the civilian population of Beirut, which had come under Israeli control, amounted to a "non-fulfillment of a duty with which the Defence Minister was charged", and it was recommended that Sharon be dismissed as Defence Minister.

Initially, Sharon refused to resign, and Prime Minister Menachem Begin refused to fire him. However, following a peace march against the government, as the marchers were dispersing, a grenade was thrown into the crowd, killing Emil Grunzweig, a reserve combat officer and peace activist, and wounding half a dozen others, including the son of the Interior Minister. Although Sharon resigned as Defence Minister, he remained in the Cabinet as a Minister without Portfolio. Years later, Sharon would be elected Israel's Prime Minister.

The Commission arrived to similar conclusions with respect to Chief of Staff, Lt. Gen. Rafael Eitan ("tantamount to a breach of duty that was incumbent upon the Chief of Staff"), as well as Director of Military Intelligence, Major General Yehoshua Saguy, and other intelligence officials — though the Mossad was not reprimanded and parts of the report commenting on its role remain under military censorship.

Critics of the Commission point to its limited scope, some of whom argue it amounted to a whitewash. The final paragraph of the report anticipated such reaction: "We do not deceive ourselves that the results of this inquiry will convince or satisfy those who have prejudices or selective consciences, but this inquiry was not intended for such people. We have striven and have spared no effort to arrive at the truth, and we hope that all persons of good will who will examine the issue without prejudice will be convinced that the inquiry was conducted without any bias."

Israel's standing in the international community, which had sunk to an all-time low in the wake of the massacre, rebounded following the publication of the report. Israel was praised from many quarters for having investigated itself and punishing senior members of its government. Richard Falk noted that the "sincere and careful" report was "much more devastating in its impact on the evaluation of state leadership during the Lebanon War than any self-scrutiny that the American government allowed during the Vietnam War."

== See also ==
- Command responsibility
- International law
- War crimes
