= Yona Efrat =

- יונה אפרת
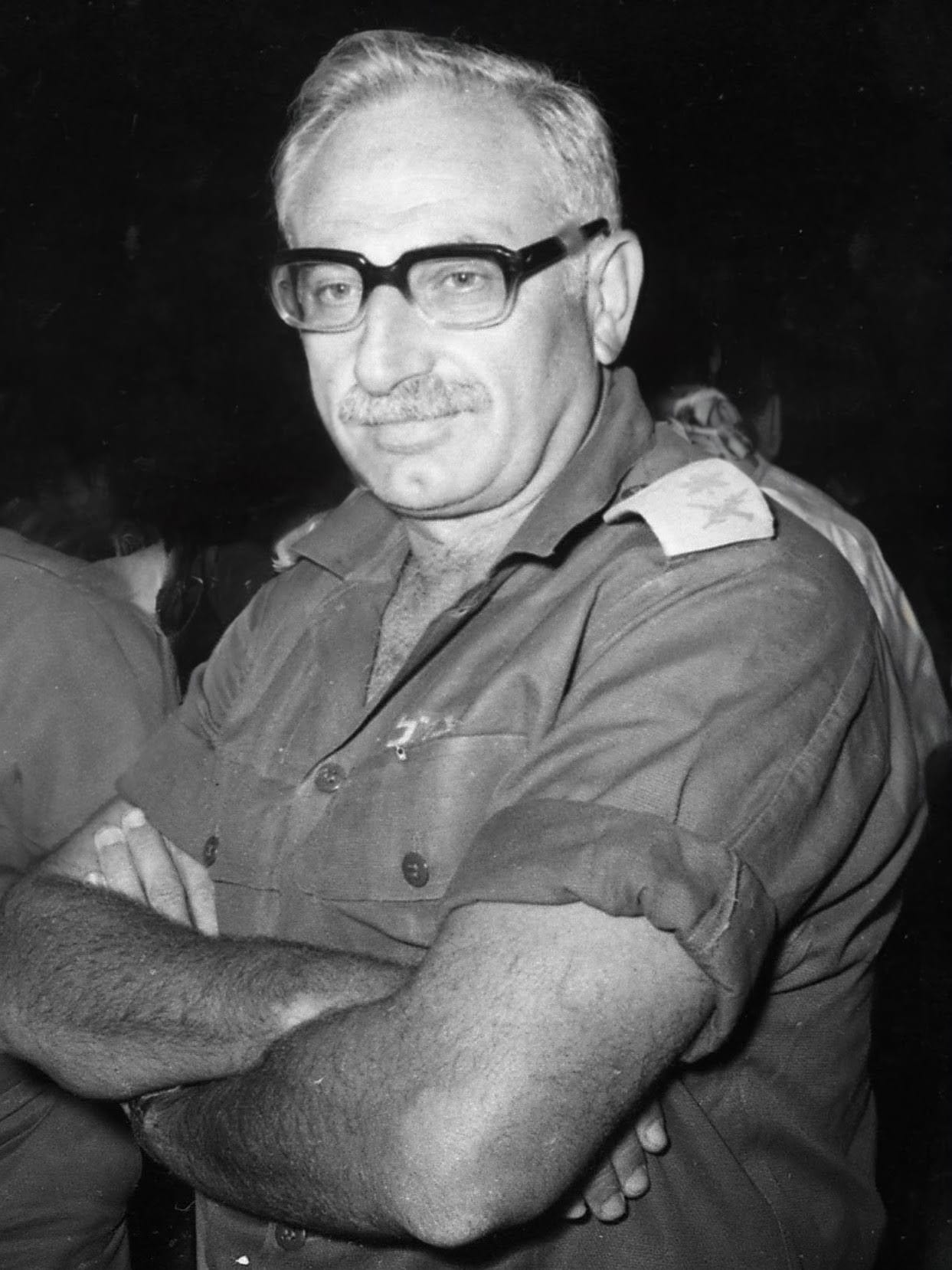
- General Efrat in 1974
- Born: Yona Huppert; October 2, 1925; Poland
- Died: June 4, 1993 (aged 67); Tel Aviv, Israel
- Military career
- Allegiance: Israel
- Branch: Haganah; Israel Defense Forces
- Service years: 1948 - 1977
- Rank: Major General
- Unit: Golani Brigade
- Commands: Central Command; Golani Brigade
- Conflicts: 1948 Palestine War; Operation Uvda; Suez Crisis; Six-Day War; Battle of Tel Faher; Yom Kippur War

Yona Efrat (Hebrew: יונה אפרת; October 2, 1925 - June 4, 1993) was an Israeli military officer. Throughout his career he served as the head of the Central Command, an assistant to the IDF Chief of Staff, and as a member of the Kahan Commission.

Efrat was the commander of the Golani Brigade during the Six-Day War, and he led the brigade in the conquest of the Golan Heights.

== Biography ==
Yona Huppert (later Efrat) was born into an Ashkenazi Jewish family in Poland in 1925. In 1935 he immigrated with his family to Palestine, where they settled in Tel Aviv. After immigrating, his surname was Hebraized from "Huppert" to "Efrat", and some time later he joined the Haganah militia.

When the 1948 Palestine War began, Yona Efrat enlisted in the Golani Brigade of the newly formed Israeli military. During this war he was wounded twice and participated in Operation Uvda, the final campaign of the war. Shortly after the war ended, he was promoted to company commander in 1950. Efrat also fought in the Suez Crisis, where he was part of the Israeli force that occupied Sharm El Sheikh in 1956. He was then promoted to battalion commander.

By 1966, Efrat was promoted to Colonel and was made the commander of the Golani Brigade. During the Six-Day War in June 1967, Efrat and his men were part of the Israeli force that invaded the Golan Heights of Syria. During this invasion, Efrat and the Golani Brigade were tasked with taking the hill of Tel Faher, the most fortified part of the Syrian defensive line. At the subsequent Battle of Tel Faher, Efrat's soldiers defeated the Syrians after engaging them in brutal close-quarters combat. The Israeli victory at Tel Faher caused the Syrian defensive line to collapse, which led to Israel conquering the Golan Heights one day later.

By 1973, Efrat was promoted to Major General and was appointed as the head of the regional Central Command, a position he held during the Yom Kippur War. Efrat was later an assistant to IDF Chief of Staff Rafael Eitan during Operation Peace for Galilee. In 1982, Efrat was appointed as a member of the Kahan Commission, which was created to investigate the Sabra and Shatila massacre.

In the 1980s, Efrat became a businessman in Israel's energy industry. He died of cancer in Tel Aviv in 1993.
