= 1997 Israeli helicopter disaster =

Mid-air collision of two helicopters in northern Israel

Coordinates: 33°13′20″N 35°38′28″E

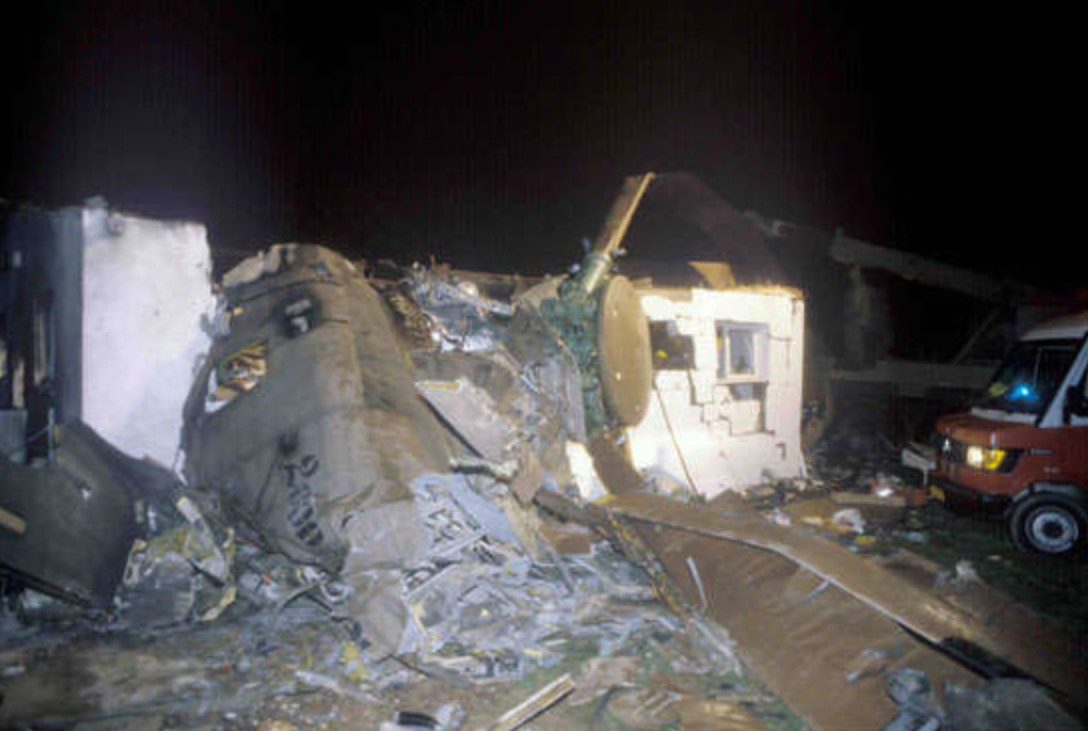
- The remains of one of the crashed helicopters

Accident
- Date: February 4, 1997
- Summary: Mid-air collision
- Site: She'ar Yashuv in northern Israel
- Total fatalities: 73
- Total survivors: 0

First aircraft
- Type: Sikorsky S-65C-3 Yas'ur 2000
- Operator: Israeli Air Force
- Registration: 357
- Fatalities: 37
- Survivors: 0

Second aircraft
- Type: Sikorsky S-65C-3 Yas'ur 2000
- Operator: Israeli Air Force
- Registration: 903
- Fatalities: 36
- Survivors: 0

The 1997 Israeli helicopter disaster (Hebrew: אסון המסוקים, romanized: Ason HaMasokim, lit. ''Disaster of the Helicopters'') occurred on February 4, 1997, when two Israeli Air Force transport helicopters ferrying Israeli soldiers into Israel's occupied zone in southern Lebanon collided in mid-air, killing all 73 Israeli military personnel on board. The crash brought about widespread national mourning and is considered a leading factor in Israel's decision to withdraw from southern Lebanon in 2000.

== Background ==
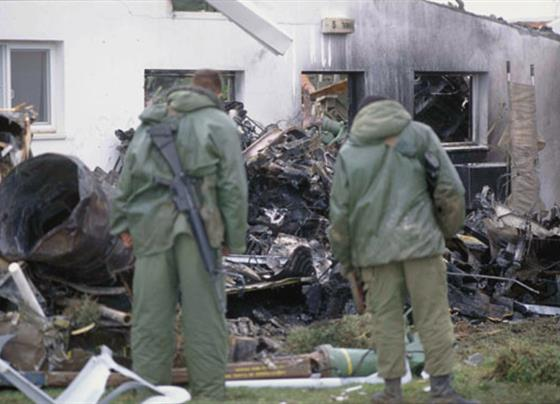
Israeli soldiers inspecting wreckage

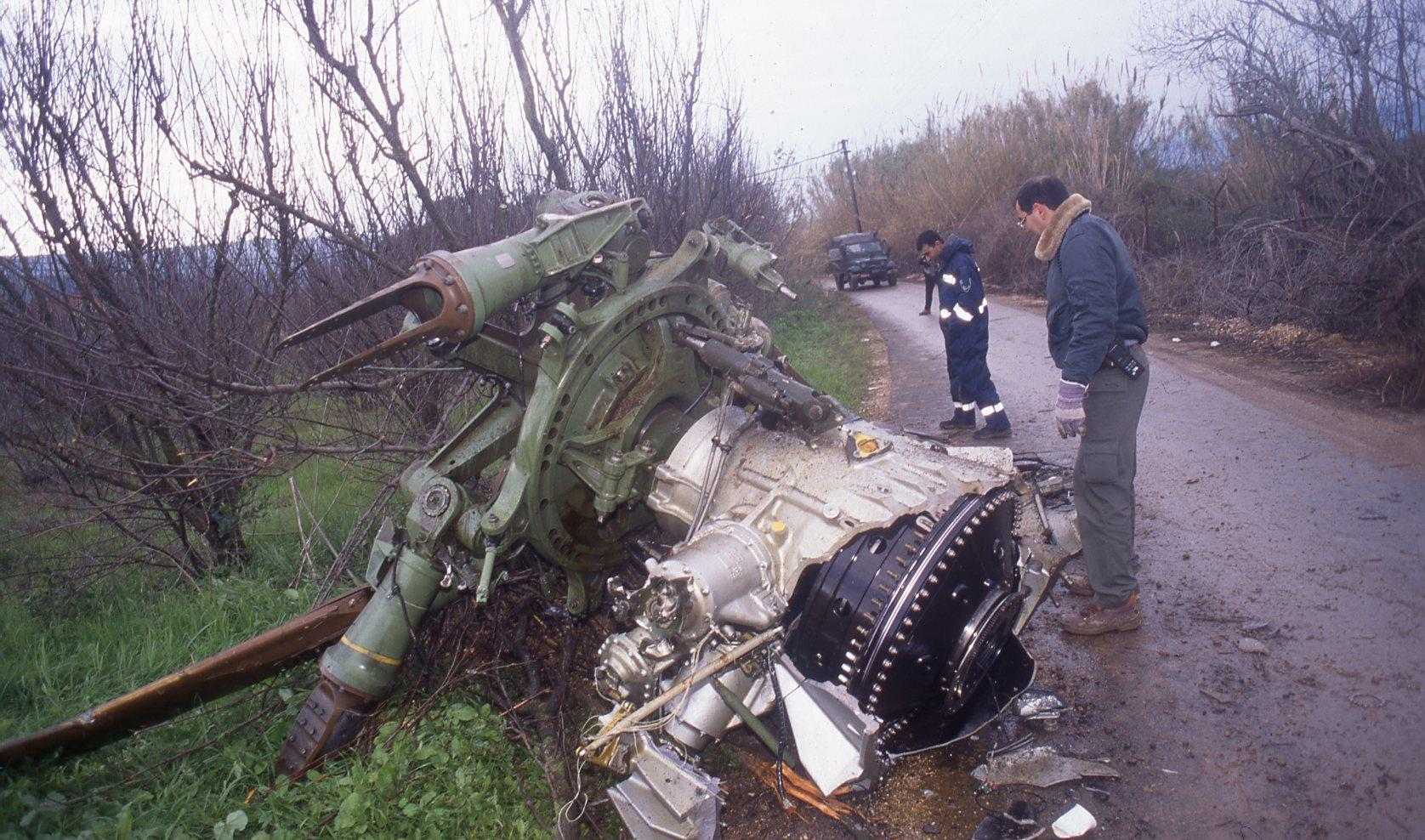
A piece of helicopter wreckage

Following the 1982 Lebanon War, Israel had withdrawn to a "security zone" in southern Lebanon, where it faced an insurgency by Hezbollah and other Lebanese groups.

Israel had originally moved troops by ground, but this policy was changed as the threat of roadside bombs increased. As a result, Israel increasingly began ferrying soldiers by air into southern Lebanon.

== The crash ==
Two Sikorsky S-65C-3 Yas'ur 2000 helicopters, 357 and 903, were assigned on a mission to fly Israeli soldiers and munitions into southern Lebanon, originally scheduled for February 3, but postponed a day due to bad weather conditions. On February 4, the weather conditions were still poor for flying due to fog. In the afternoon visibility improved, and the mission was allowed to go forward.

The two helicopters took off from Tel Nof Airbase and flew to Rosh Pina Airport, from where they collected the troops. One helicopter, numbered 903, was designated to fly to the "Pumpkin" Outpost, east of Nabatiyeh, and had four crew and 32 passengers on board. The second helicopter, 357, was to fly to an Israeli position at Beaufort Castle, and had four crew and 33 passengers on board.

At 6:48 PM, after final approval was given and the soldiers had been briefed, both helicopters were cleared to take off. A minute after takeoff, the captain of the helicopter 903 requested permission from air traffic control to cross the border into Lebanon. Permission was delayed, and the helicopters ended up hovering until 6:56 PM, when a controller confirmed that they had permission to cross. Three minutes later, the helicopters disappeared from radar.

The two helicopters collided over moshav She'ar Yashuv in northern Israel. An Israeli investigation concluded that the rotor of helicopter 357 struck the tail of helicopter 903. Helicopter 357 immediately crashed, while the crew of helicopter 903 attempted to take control of it, but failed, and it crashed as well. According to one witness who observed the event from the ground, "Two helicopters passed over my house without their lights on. Then there was a flash. One fell straight away and the other wavered for half a kilometre... then it also exploded." One of the helicopters crashed in a fireball directly onto She'ar Yashuv, setting an empty bungalow on fire, while the other crashed into the cemetery of kibbutz Dafna a few hundred metres away.

Fires, fueled by jet fuel from the helicopters, broke out on the ground, and munitions that had been stored aboard the helicopters cooked off and set off a series of explosions. Some witnesses claimed they could hear faint cries coming from the wreckage, but they could not get close to them because of the explosions, and that the cries ceased after the explosions. One witness claimed to have seen a soldier thrown from a helicopter who initially still had a pulse, but died soon after. All 73 soldiers on the helicopters were killed. There were no casualties on the ground.

Following the crash, soldiers, firefighters, and rescue crews raced to the scene. Magen David Adom rushed twenty ambulances and two mobile intensive care units to the scene. However, it soon became clear there were no survivors. Fearing that additional ammunition could explode, the IDF cordoned off all communities in the area, declaring them closed military zones, shut down all local roads, and sent in bomb squads to clear the area of explosives. This created massive traffic jams and temporarily prevented hundreds of people from reaching their homes.

Rescue crews recovered bodies and pieces of equipment from the scene, and some of the dead were found still strapped into their seats. The bodies were taken to a makeshift morgue set up on a nearby military base for identification. The IDF censored news of the crash for more than two hours to enable the families of the victims to be informed, but swift identification proved impossible. All of the bodies had been recovered by the morning of February 5.

== Aftermath ==
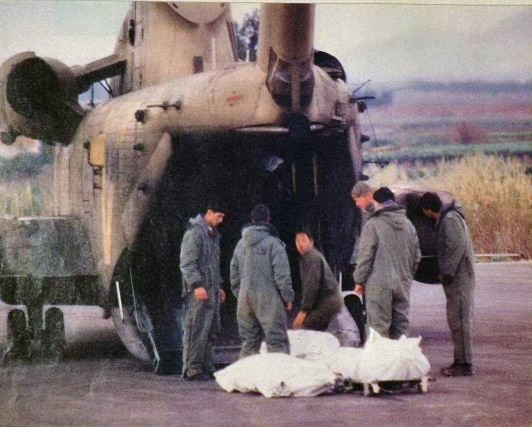
Bodies of victims being readied for transport

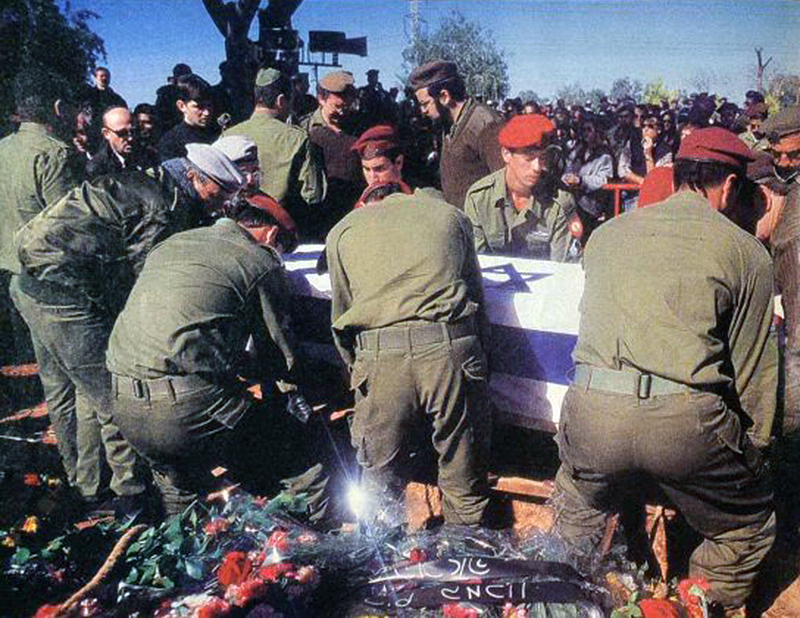
The funeral of one of the victims

The crash was the deadliest air disaster in Israeli history. A wave of national mourning swept Israel. According to Joshua L. Gleis, "In a close-knit country where nearly everyone joins the military, a huge portion of the nation's population knew at least one of the soldiers killed in the crash."

February 6 was declared an official day of mourning. Flags were flown at half-mast, restaurants and cinemas closed, the Knesset observed a minute of silence, and the names of the dead were read out at the beginning of every news bulletin on television and radio. Thousands of Israelis went to pray at the Western Wall and assemblies were held at schools nationwide.

The funerals began taking place on February 5. Prime Minister Benjamin Netanyahu and President Ezer Weizman attended funerals and visited the grieving families.

Israeli Defense Minister Yitzhak Mordechai appointed a commission of inquiry headed by David Ivry to investigate the cause of the collision. The commission recommended that the commander of the helicopters' squadron be dismissed and barred from any future command positions, the commander of Tel Nof Airbase and the deputy commander of the squadron, who had briefed the pilots before their mission, be reprimanded, and that the officer in charge of Rosh Pina Airport be dismissed from his position and barred from serving in any command position for three years.

In its recommendations to prevent future accidents, the commission recommended that the number of flights per pilot be reduced, that clear procedures be established regarding the turning off of lights when crossing borders, that a lead helicopter be established when two fly together, that squadrons operate under the same procedures, and that helicopters fly alone during any night flights into southern Lebanon. It recommended that the Israeli Air Force install black boxes in its helicopters.

The disaster sparked renewed debate about Israel's occupation of southern Lebanon. Later that year, the Four Mothers, an anti-war protest movement dedicated to pressing for an Israeli withdrawal from southern Lebanon, was founded. This event is seen as a catalyst for Israel's withdrawal from the security zone in Lebanon in 2000.

== Memorials ==
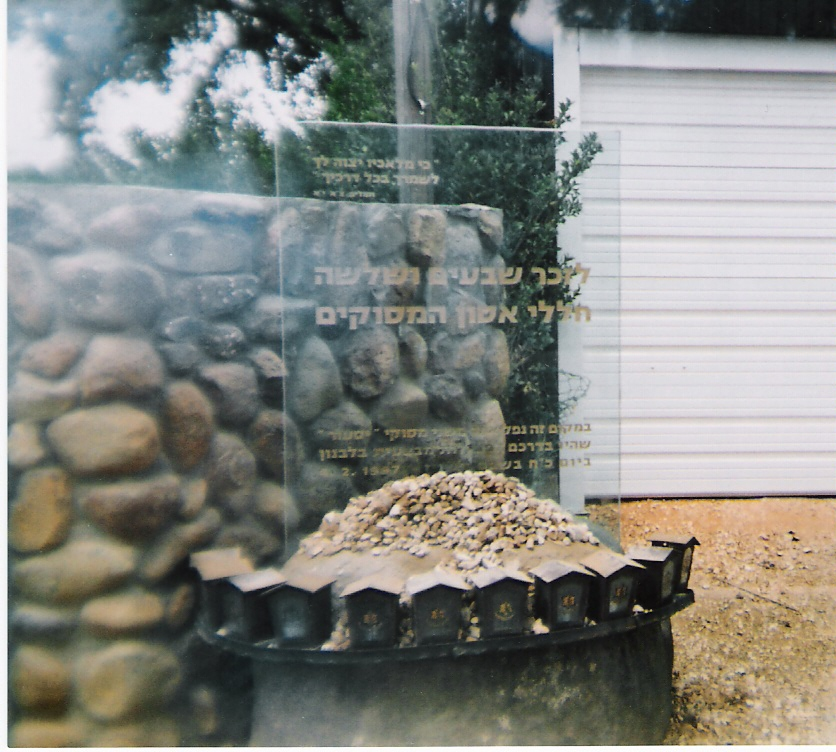
Monument at the crash site in She'ar Yashuv (not the main memorial) with Psalm 91:11.

A memorial to the 73 dead IDF soldiers was created near the crash site of one helicopter next to the cemetery of kibbutz Dafna. It was inaugurated in 2008. The memorial consists of a number of elements, the most visible being 73 stones erected around a round pool to which water is directed through a channel. The 73 names are written on black blocks placed under the water of the pool. A Bible verse from Job 41:17 is inscribed. The monument was designed by architect Shlomit Shlomo, landscape architects Haim Cohen and Gilad Sharon, sculptor Rami Feldstein; sculptor Dani Karavan acted as an adviser for the project.

In moshav She'ar Yashuv, where the second helicopter crashed, another monument was erected. On the southeast edge of the moshav, the "Forest of the Fallen" was planted to memorize the dead. The forest has 73 trees, one for each victim of the crash.

There are numerous other memorial monuments throughout Israel commemorating the disaster. In addition, there exist memorials for individual soldiers in the places where they lived.

On February 15, 2017, a memorial service was held in Kibbutz Dafna to mark the 20th anniversary of the disaster. Bereaved families of the victims attended, as well as President Reuven Rivlin, Defense Minister Avigdor Lieberman, and IDF Chief of Staff Gadi Eizenkot.

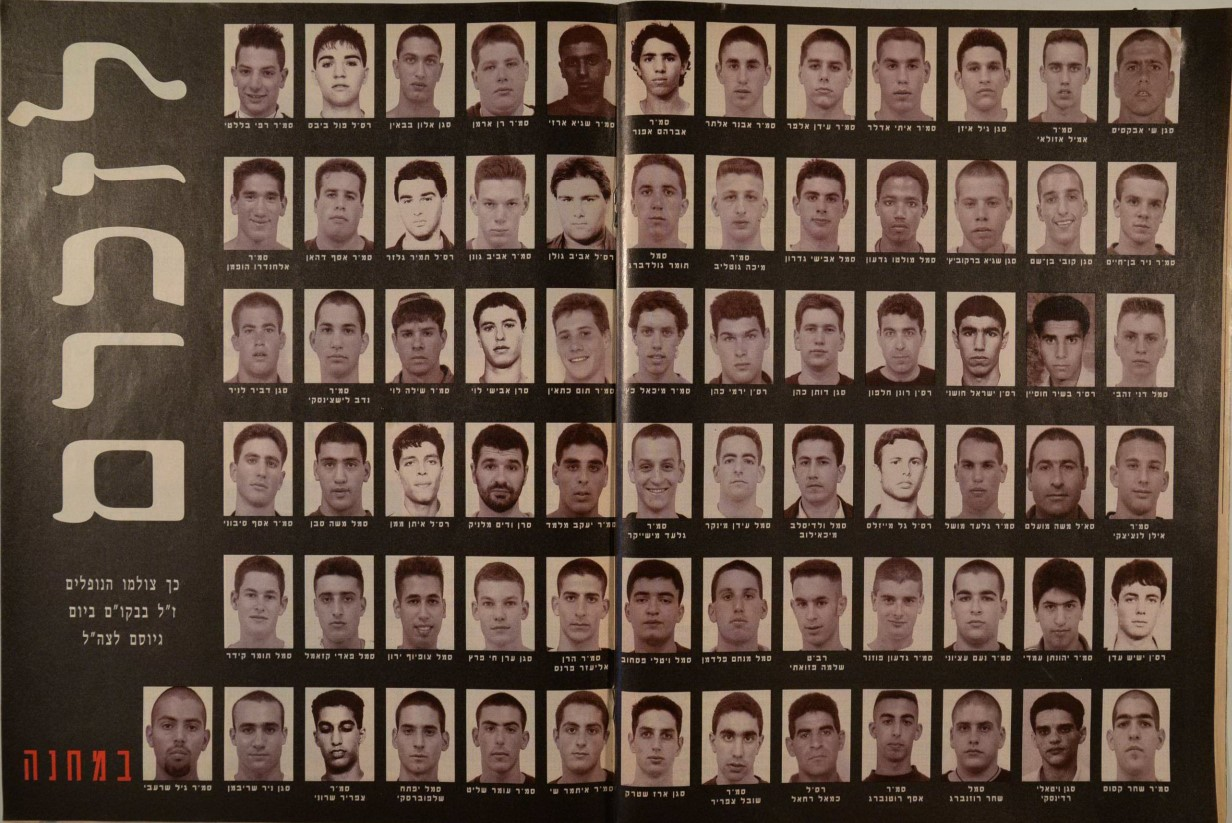
Portrait photos of all 73 victims

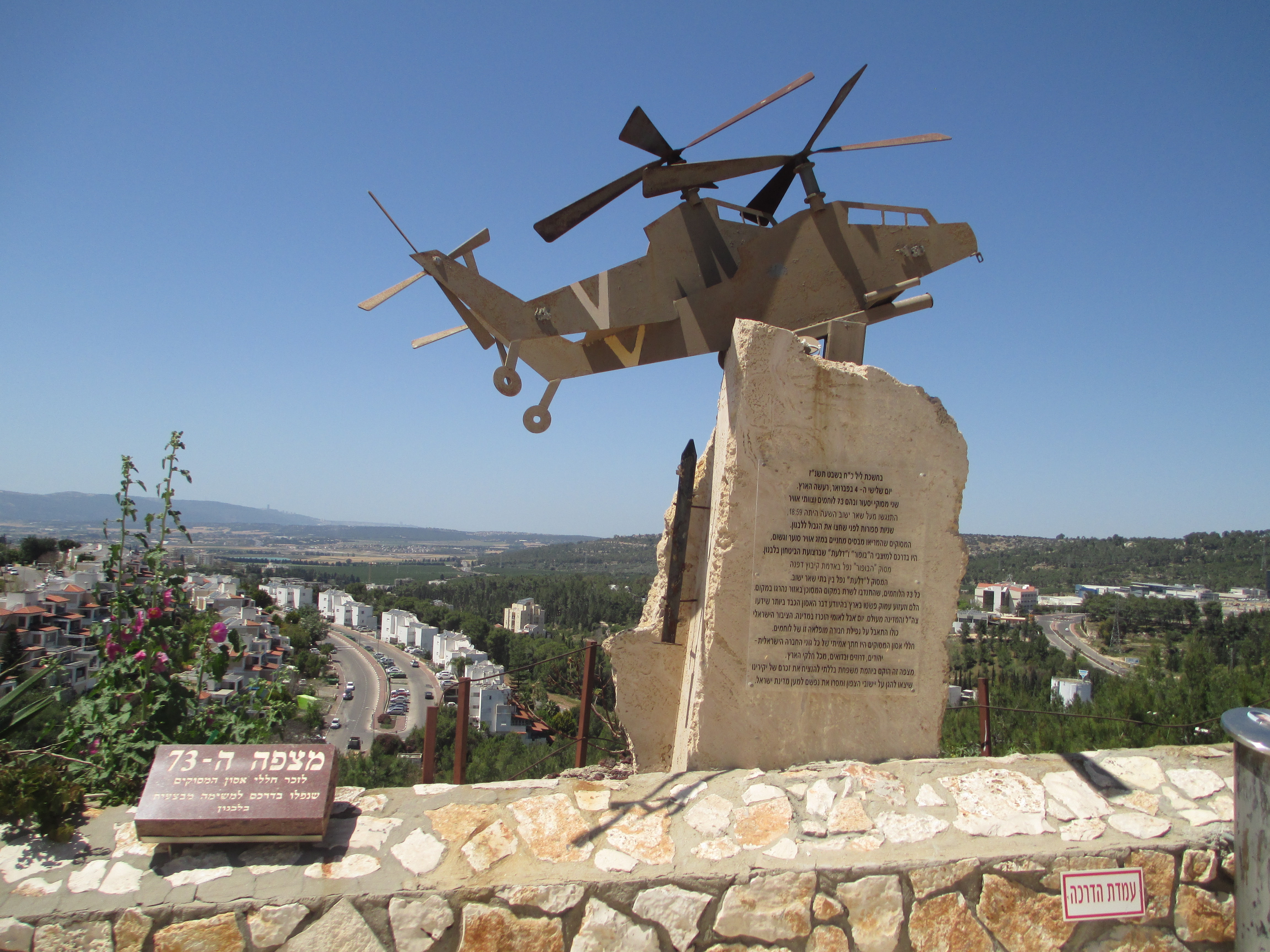
Memorial in Migdal HaEmek

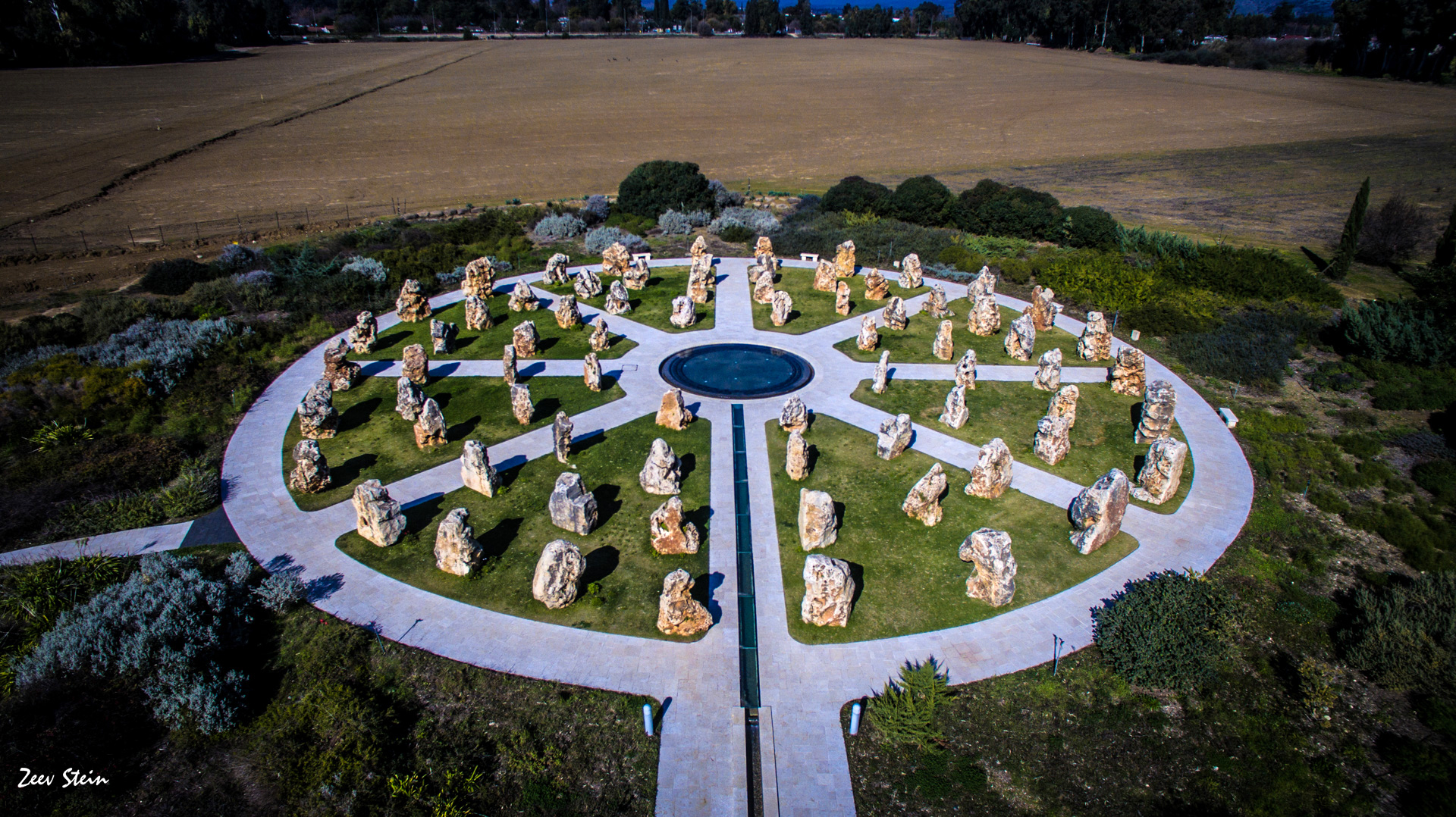
Memorial in She'ar Yashuv

== See also ==
- 1977 Israeli Air Force Sikorsky CH-53 crash
