= 1977 Israeli Air Force Sikorsky CH-53 crash =

Helicopter crash

Coordinates: 31.9321°N 35.4365°E

1977 Israeli Air Force Sikorsky CH-53 Sea Stallion crash
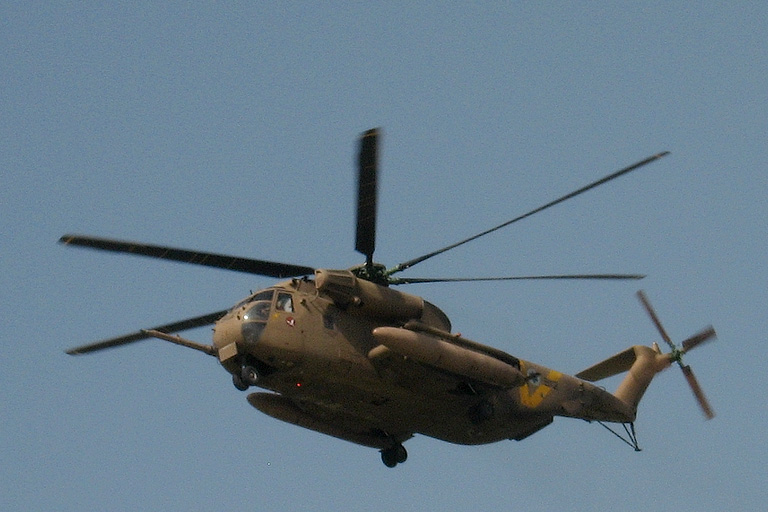
- An Israeli Air Force Sikorsky CH-53, similar to the aircraft involved

Accident
- Date: 10 May 1977
- Summary: Controlled flight into terrain
- Site: Jordan Valley

Aircraft
- Aircraft type: Sikorsky CH-53 Sea Stallion
- Operator: Israeli Air Force
- Registration: 960
- Occupants: 54
- Passengers: 44
- Crew: 10
- Fatalities: 54
- Survivors: 0

On 10 May 1977, an Israeli Air Force Sikorsky CH-53 Yas'ur helicopter crashed during an exercise in the Jordan Valley, killing all 54 on board (including the 10-member flight crew). The disaster became known as Ason HaNun-Daled, or "Disaster of the 54".

It remains the worst single-aircraft accident in the West Bank. The crash site was in the Jordan Valley, near the Israeli settlement of Na'aran, north of Jericho in a wadi. The cause was determined to be flying at too low an altitude during the dark, which caused the helicopter to strike a hill, crash and explode (CFIT, Controlled flight into terrain).

== See also ==
- 1997 Israeli helicopter disaster
