= Tel Azaziat =

Hill in the Golan Heights

Coordinates: 33°13′32″N 35°40′01″E

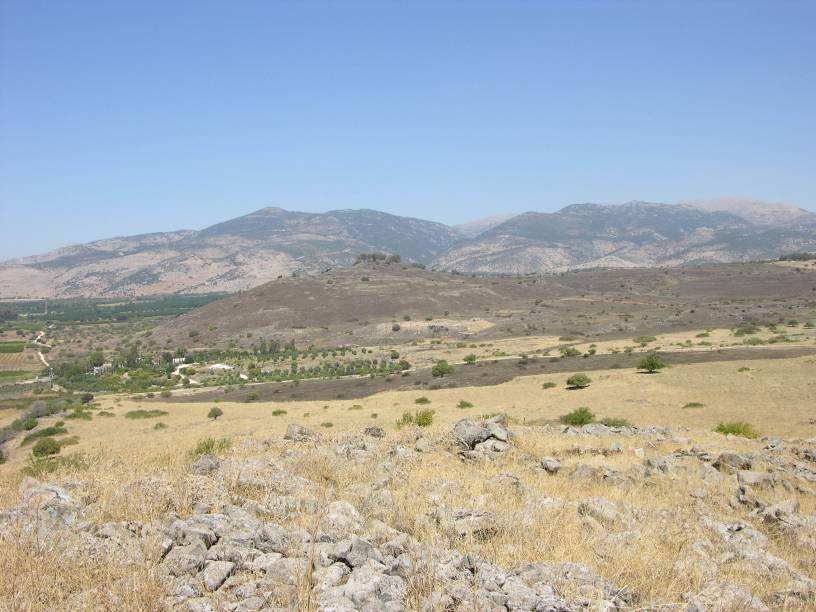
View from Giv'at Ha'Em to north to Tel Azaziat

Tel Azaziat (Hebrew: תל עזזיאת; Arabic name also transliterated Tel 'Azzaziat) is a hill in the foothills of the Golan Heights in northern Israel, 330 m above sea level, 1.5 km east of moshav She'ar Yashuv, 1.5 km south east of kibbutz Dan and 2 km west of Tel Faher. The basalt hill was a Syrian military outpost built within the DMZ, used to shell the Israeli villages below. It has views of eastern Hula Valley.

== History ==
Due to its proximity to the Banias spring, the history of Tel Azaziat is closely connected.

=== Boundary demarcation agreement 1923 ===
Boundary changes in the area of the Golan Heights in the twentieth century.

In 1916, Britain and France concluded the Sykes–Picot Agreement, which proposed to divide the Middle East between them into spheres of influence. The formal objective of the League of Nations Mandate system was to administer parts of the defunct Ottoman Empire, which had been in control of the Middle East since the 16th century. The two powers had to solve the difficult task for a creation of a boundary line running from Metula to Tel Dan until the Gulf of Eilat, after Britain had been given a League of Nations mandate for Palestine in 1922.

On 23 December 1920, the two powers came to a preliminary agreement according to which a section of the boundary line would pass through a body of water, the Sea of Galilee. (..) Such a boundary line would have divided the Sea of Galilee into two unequal parts, giving joint territorial domination over the two parts of the lake. (..) Under the influence of the actual topography as well as in response to political pressures and the desire to interfere as little as possible in everyday life in the border zone, the boundary was shifted from the location originally agreed upon. In a boundary demarcation agreement initialled on 3 February 1922, and finally ratified a year later on 7 March 1923, the boundary line between Palestine and Syria was defined as a set of straight lines joining a number of designated points, clearly definable on the ground. (..) the intention was not to associate it [the boundaries] with the River Jordan, the Hule lake or the Sea of Galilee, but rather to distance it to the east of these water bodies and thus to avoid claims of joint sovereignty over them.

=== Syrian independence 1946 ===
In April 1946, when Syria was granted Independence, France and Britain signed an agreement to hand over control of the Banias to the British mandate of Palestine. The Syrian government expressed wishes to leave Banias within Syrian territory and afterwards declared France's signature to be invalid. The British refused to discuss the situation.

=== After the 1948 War ===
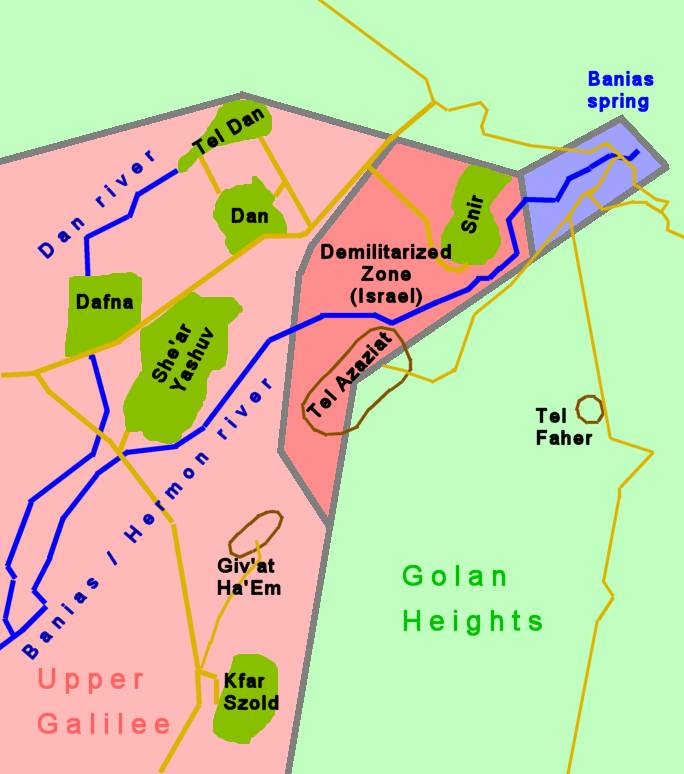
DMZ Tel Azaziat, Snir

On the day the British left Palestine, Syrian forces crossed the border and attacked nearby Israeli settlements. Most assaults were repulsed, but by the end of the 1948 Arab-Israeli War three small areas, west of the international border, remained in Syrian hands. In the 1949 Armistice Agreements, Syria agreed to withdraw its troops from the occupied areas and to turn them into demilitarized zones. Sovereignty in these sections was acknowledged to be Israeli, but no side was allowed to build there fortifications or keep military forces. The Syrians violated the agreement and built several purely military positions west of the border, some in the DMZs, like Tel Azaziat, which was used for unceasing attacks against Israel.

A letter dated 25 February 1960 from the representative of Israel to the President of the Security Council claimed,

(..) On 11 July 1957 Israel requested the United Nations Truce Supervision Organization in Palestine to establish United Nations observation posts along the Israel-Syrian border. It was hoped that they might deter the Syrian authorities from pursuing their acts of aggression. These posts still exist, but Syrian attacks across the border and penetrations into Israel territory continue. Syrian military positions still encroach on Israel territory, for instance at Darbashiya, at Tel Azaziat, and at the mouth of the Jordan on the northern shore of Lake Kinneret. The continuation of Syrian violations of the Armistice Agreement in these areas as well as in the areas of Nuqeib and El-Hamma creates a constant threat to peace. (..)

On 13 November 1964, the IAF puts Plan 'Ayit' into effect. It calls for launching attacks on Arab targets in response for the shelling of Israeli settlements. Israeli Mysteres attack the Syrian position at Tel Azaziat on the same day.

There was no common border agreement from April 1946 until the Six-Day War of June 1967.

=== The Six-Day War 1967 ===
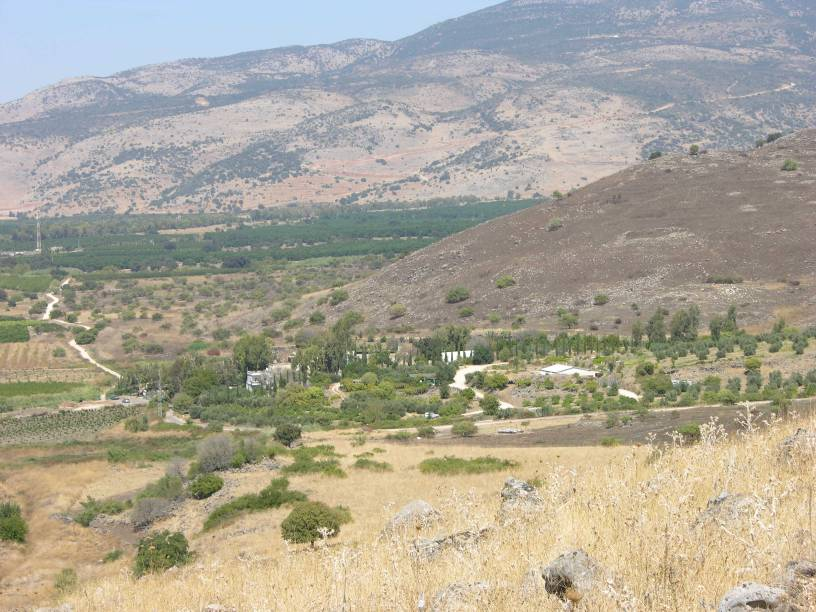
View to Nebi Yahud and Tel Azaziat

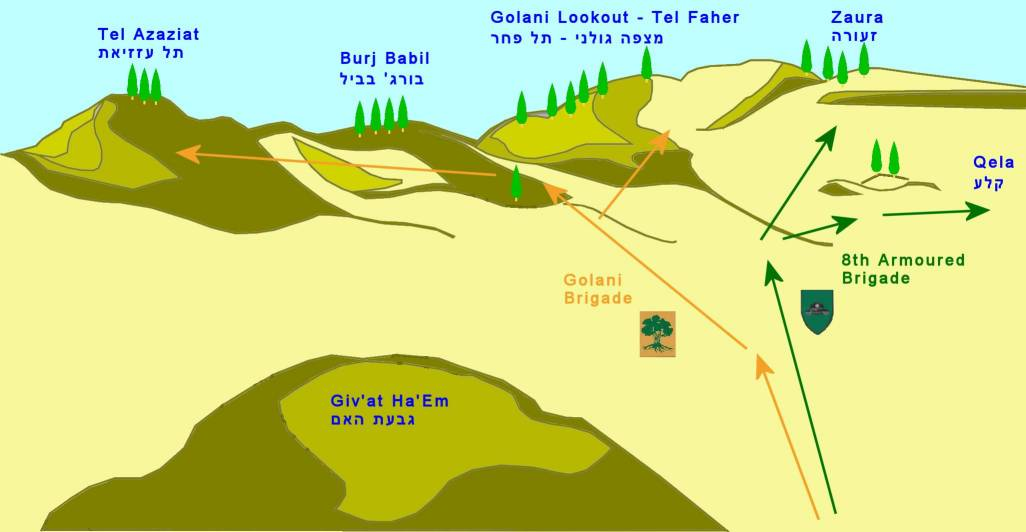
Bird's eye view of Tel Azaziat, Burj Babil, Tel Faher, Zaura

Syrian units designated to take part in operation Victory began assembling on the night of May 24. Troops from the Syrian 35th Division reinforced the positions at Banias and Tel Azaziat.

A report filed by the UNTSO Tiberias Control Centre describes the situation during the first hours of the break-out of the Six-Day War:

(..) 5. The UNTSO Tiberias control centre reported that heavy firing broke out at 0355 hours GMT on 6 June along almost the entire length of the Israel/Syria Armistice Demarcation Line. Artillery, tanks, aircraft and napalm were employed. The UNTSO Tiberias control centre reported that at 0528 hours GMT Syrian armed forces had launched an infantry attack from Tel Azaziat towards Shea'r. At 0552 hours the Senior Israel Delegate informed the Israel-Syrian Mixed Armistice Commission that Syrian forces had launched an armour and infantry attack towards Tel El Qadi. A cease-fire had been proposed by the Chairman of the Mixed Armistice Commission for 0600 hours GMT but the fighting continued. At 0943 hours GMT the Chairman of the Israel-Syrian Mixed Armistice Commission reported that he was still in contact with both the Syrian and Israel delegations and that the bulk of his OP's continued to be manned. Two proposed cease-fires since the fighting broke out along the Israel/Syria Armistice Demarcation Line had been unsuccessful, and in his opinion a local cease-fire was not feasible in the present circumstances. (..)

On the fifth day of the war, on 9 June 1967, Israeli defense minister Moshe Dayan reverses his stand and the decision of the cabinet, and orders attack on the Golan Heights.

- 11:30 Advance begins from Giv'at Ha'Em towards Syrian lines in northern Golan.
- 12:35 IDF conquers Tel Hallal.
- 17:00 IDF conquers Tel Azaziat.
- 18:20 IDF takes Tel Faher bunkers after a bloody battle.
- 18:30 IDF takes Zaura - Qela compound.
- 20:00 IDF takes Rouya.

On the night of June 9–10, the 8th armored brigade advanced toward the Banias region and captured it on the morning of the 10th of June. The constant shelling from Tel Azaziat during 19 years came finally to an end.

=== Present ===
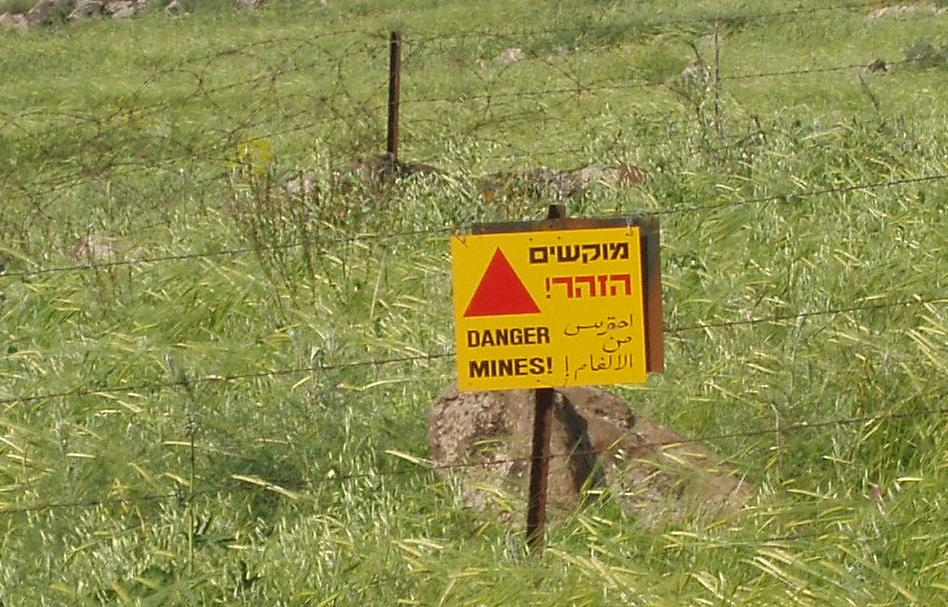
Danger mines

On top of Tel Azaziat are still the remains of the Syrian fortifications, as are the mines laid by the Syrian army around the hill, the only cleared sector is in direction to Tel Faher.
