= Givat HaEm =

Coordinates: 33°12′42″N 35°39′31″E

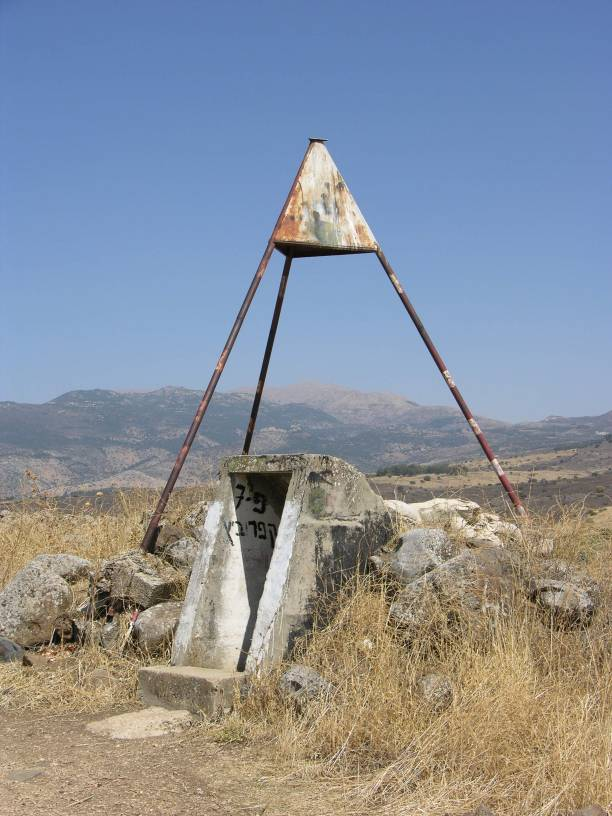
Small bunker at the top of Giv'at Ha'Em

Giv'at Ha'Em (Hebrew: גבעת האם) is a hill named for American Zionist leader Henrietta Szold, known as the mother (em, Hebrew: אם) of Youth Aliya. The hill lies in the Galilee Panhandle in northern Israel, 196 m above sea level, 1 km east of the Route 918 and 2 km north of Kfar Szold.

== History ==
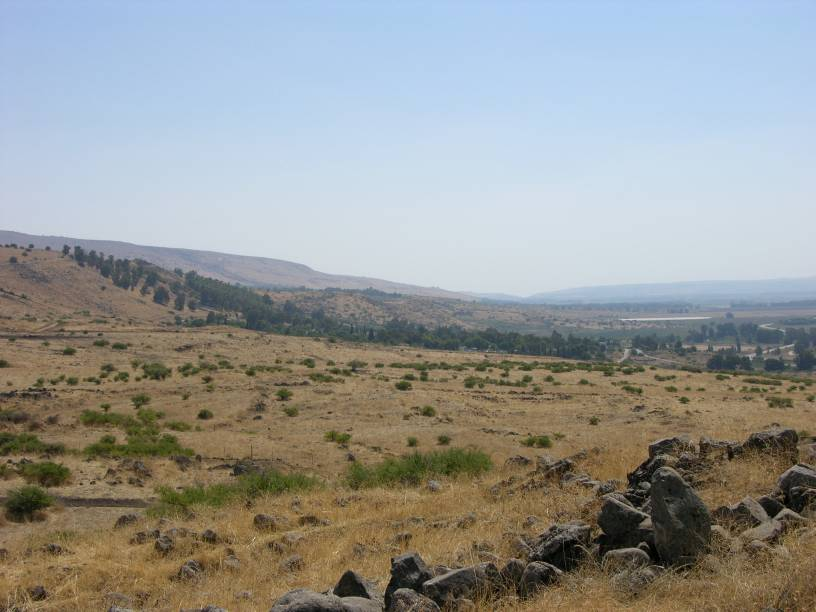
View to south to Kfar Szold

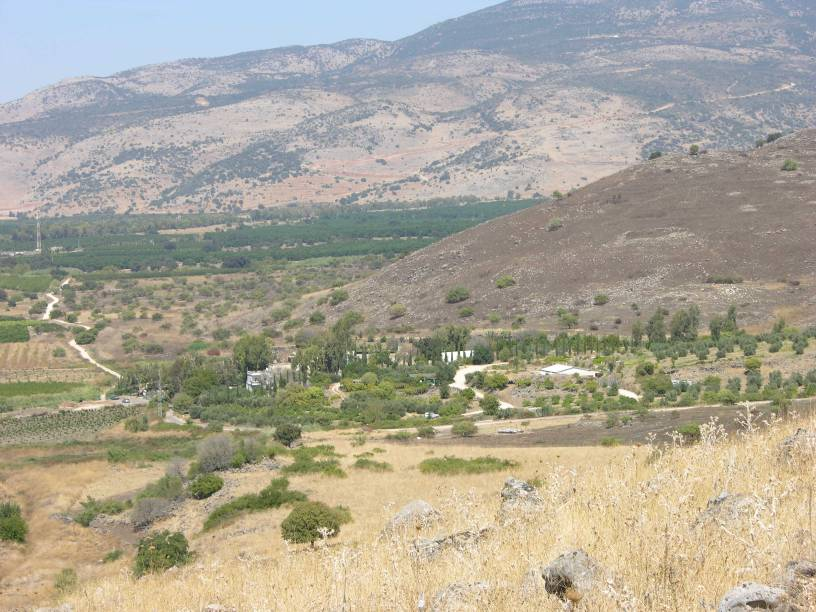
View to north to Nebi Yahud and Tel Azaziat

Givat AeEm, like other basalt hills in the eastern Hula Valley, was formed by a spurt of basalt stone during the formation of the Jordan Rift Valley.

Israeli soldiers built a border outpost on Giv'at Ha'Em after the War of Independence. It was located directly across from Syrian positions on the slopes of the Golan Heights. Israeli troops on the hill were frequently involved in fire exchanges with Syrian troops who were shelling the farmers in the Hula valley.

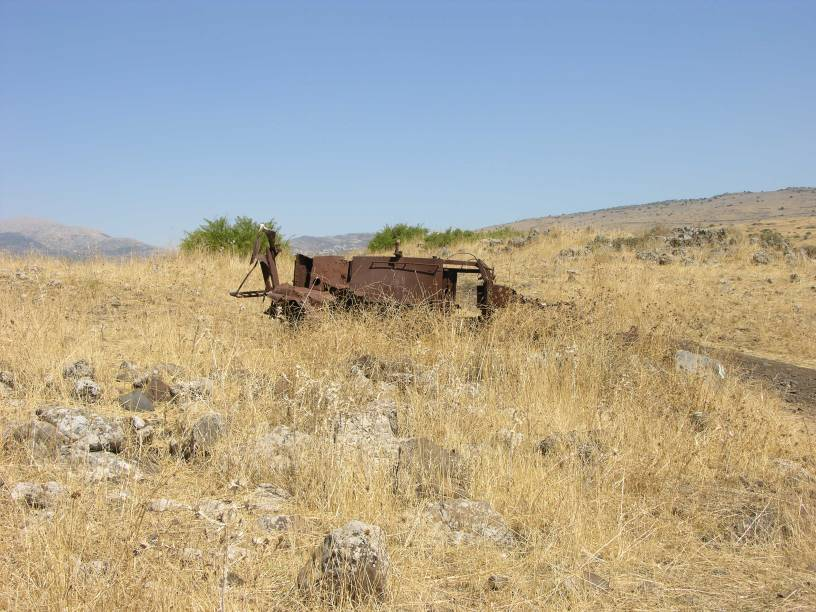
An APC left from 1967

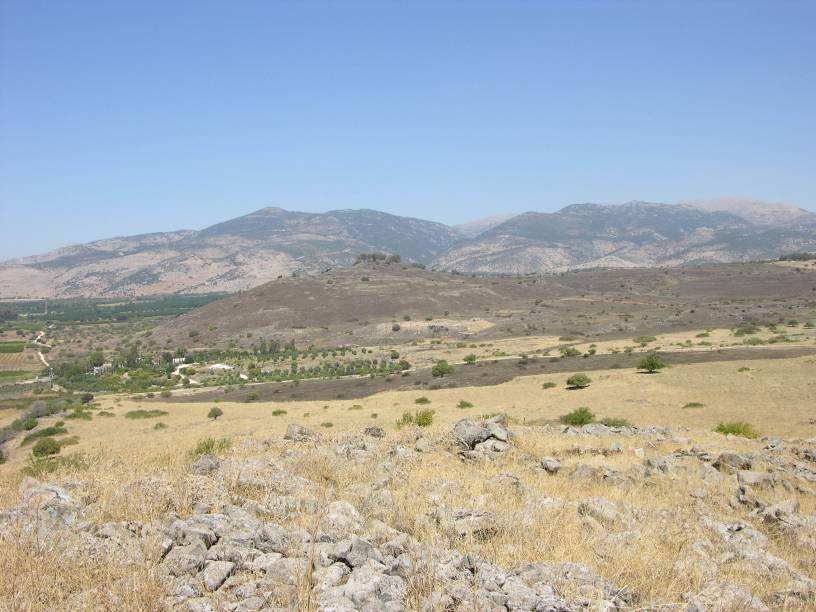
View of Tel Azaziat and Anti-Lebanon Mountains

Givat HaEm was the site of combat during the Six-Day War. The 8th Brigade, which was brought from the Sinai, and the Golani Brigade were deployed near Giv'at Ha'Em. The topographical conditions were very difficult: the steep, rugged and rocky slopes of the Golan prevented an easy build of a transportation line, while the Syrian army sat in well fortified strongholds and could fire easily from above. Nevertheless, it was from Giv'at Ha'em that Israel made its first advances into Syria.

After two days of heavy bombardment by the Israeli Air Force, the breakthrough came at 10:00 on the morning of 9 June 1967. It was commanded by Albert Mandler's tank brigade 8, which showered the Syrian posts to the north, on the top of the Heights. In a complex engineering operation, soldiers from the Engineering Corps cleared the way of mines. They were followed by bulldozers which leveled a route for the tanks on the rocky face.

During the battle, the 8th Brigade advanced toward the direction of Zaura and Qela, while traversing difficult terrain and meeting Syrian resistance; at the end of the battle, only two functioning tanks reached Qela. A force consisting of infantry, Nahal and paratroopers defeated a series of other posts overlooking the Hula valley in the southern sector of the Heights and enables the passage of tanks deep into enemy territory. The Golani brigade under the command of Colonel Yona Efrat advanced and captured the posts in Burj Babil, Tel Azaziat and Tel Faher.

At Burj Babil, Syrian officers fled after the first Israeli shots were fired, prompting their men to do the same. By contrast, the number of Syrian units that fought on in their positions even long after the Israelis had gained the upper hand was at least as great and probably greater, than those instances of units breaking at first contact. At Tel Azaziat, the officers tried to surrender their position to the Israelis but their men refused, firing on their officers and fighting the Israelis tooth and nail before being overwhelmed by tank fire and the flanking attack. On the night of June 9–10, the 8th brigade advanced toward the Banias region and captured it on the morning of the 10th of June.

Today, Givat HaEm is a Jewish National Fund overlook.
