= She'ar Yashuv =

Moshav in northern Israel

She'ar Yashuv: שְׁאָר יָשׁוּב (Hebrew)
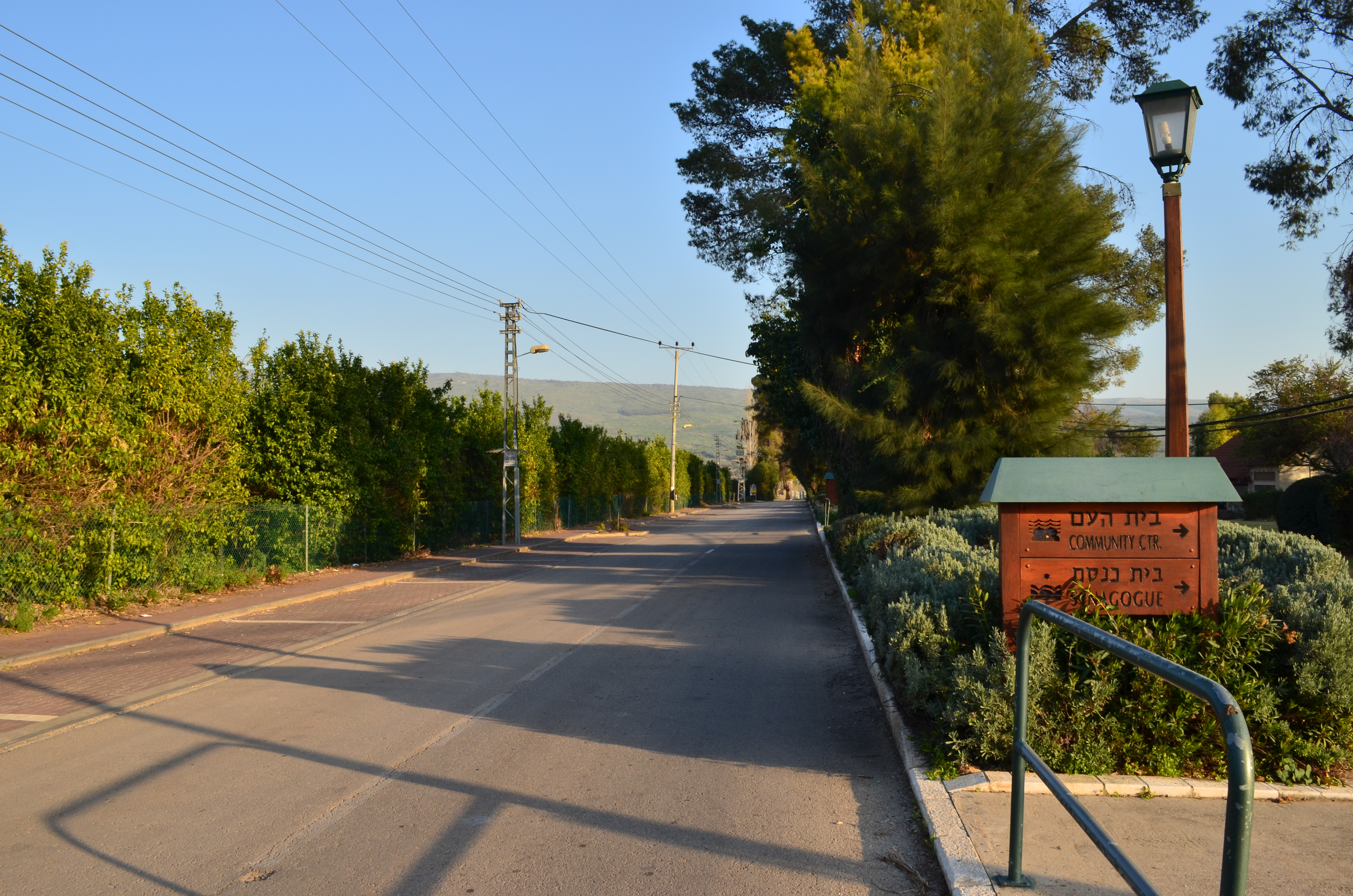

- Location within Northeast Israel
- Coordinates: 33°13′35″N 35°38′48″E
- Country: Israel
- District: Northern
- Subdistrict: Safed
- Council: Mevo'ot HaHermon
- Affiliation: HaOved HaTzioni
- Founded: 1940
- Founder: HaNoar HaTzioni and HaOved HaTzioni members
- Population (2024): 832

She'ar Yashuv (Hebrew: שְׁאָר יָשׁוּב) is a moshav in northern Israel. Located in the Upper Galilee in the northeastern Hula Valley, it falls under the jurisdiction of Mevo'ot HaHermon Regional Council. In 2024 it had a population of 832.

The moshav came to public awareness after the 1997 Israeli helicopter disaster, when two IDF helicopters collided in midair above the settlement, killing 73 people on board.

== Name ==
The name "She'ar Yashuv" (Hebrew: שאר ישוב, lit. 'the remnant shall return/a few will return') is based on the eponymous son of the prophet Isaiah (see Isaiah 7:3).

== History ==
=== Identification with Beth 'Anath ===
Recent studies have identified the area of She'ar Yashuv with Beth-Anath (בֵּית עֲנָת), mentioned in the Hebrew Bible as one of the fortified cities allotted to the tribe of Naphtali (Joshua 19:38). It reappears in Judges 1:33, where Naphtali is said not to have expelled its Canaanite inhabitants, who instead became subject to forced labor.

A Greek boundary stone from the reign of Diocletian (284–305 CE), part of the Panias (Banias) corpus of territorial markers in the upper Jordan basin, records the village name Βηθθ Ἀνάθης (Beth-Anath), a site also known from the bible and Hellenistic sources. Roy Marom has tentatively identified it with Tell ʿAnt in the vicinity of She'ar Yashuv, on the basis of spatial considerations and Roman–Byzantine archaeological remains in the area.

=== Modern history ===
She'ar Yashuv was first founded in February 1940 along with Beit Hillel as part of the Tower and Stockade system by 30 families from the HaNoar HaTzioni ("Zionist Youth") and HaOved HaTzioni ("Zionist Workers"). It was originally called Metzadat Ussishkin Gimel, lit. "Ussishkin Fortress (No.) 3", named after Menahem Ussishkin, before being renamed Aleh Reish ("Go Up, Take Possession"). The present name is taken from the Book of Isaiah 10:21 ("A remnant will return, (the remnant of Jacob)").

When the battles of the 1948 Arab–Israeli War ended and a ceasefire was declared at the end of 1948, most of the inhabitants abandoned the community because of artillery shells fired by Syria from Tel Azaziat, which overlooks the village from the east. In 1949 it was resettled by remnants of the original community. This time, by members of HaNoar HaTzioni from Hungary who survived the Holocaust and had come to Israel during the war.

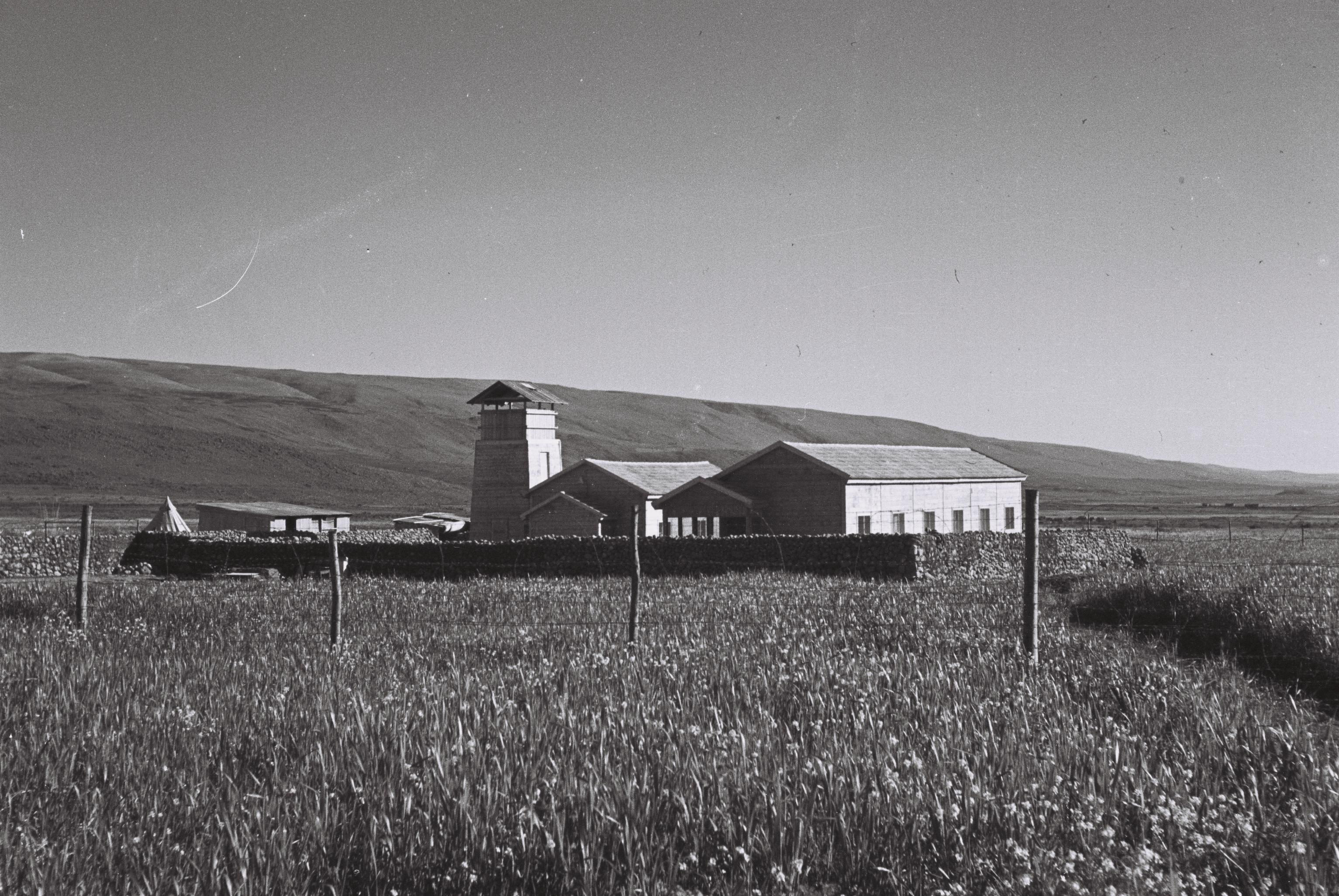
She’ar Yeshuv March 1940

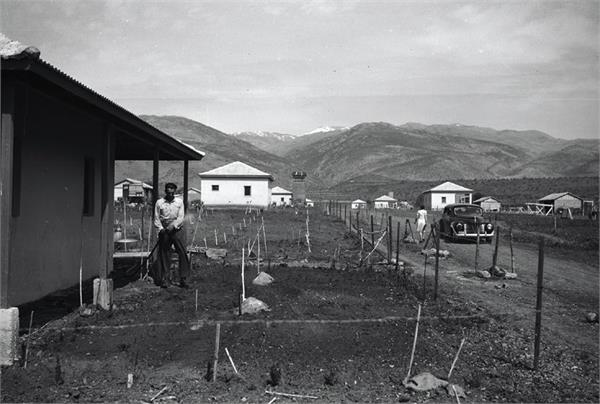
She’ar Yashuv 1942, tower visible in distance

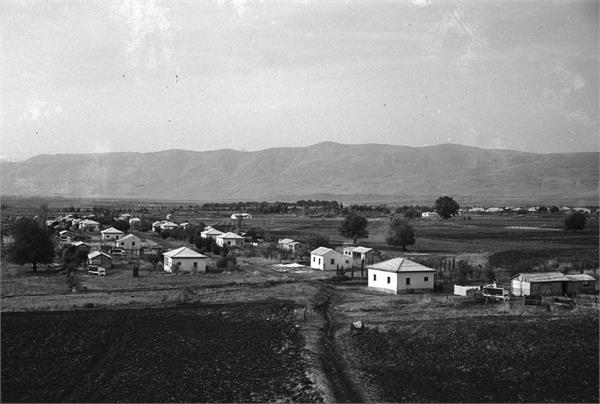
She’ar Yashuv 1946

The Syrians shot at the settlers for 19 years from Tel Azaziat, and in 1957 killed Yosef Ben-Haim, a member of the moshav. During the second day of the Six-Day War, the Syrians tried to capture She'ar Yashuv. Radio Damascus and the French daily Le Monde even announced that the moshav had been captured by the Syrians. However, a few of the defenders who stood steadfastly chased away the Syrians with mortar fire. The Syrians returned to attack the moshav a number of times, but did not succeed to capture it. On 9 June 1967, fighters of the Golani Brigade captured Tel Azaziat and removed the immediate Syrian danger from the moshav. Israel kept the conquered Golan Heights and the new cease-fire line is much farther east than the one from 1948.

During the 1970s and 1980s, Katyusha rockets launched by Lebanese terrorists caused property damage in the moshav.

== Places of interest ==
On the south end of the moshav are remnants of al-Mansura with a flour mill.

The "Forest of the Fallen" is located on the southeast edge of the moshav. In the forest are 73 trees planted in memory of the 73 victims of the helicopter crash that occurred on 4 February 1997 above She'ar Yashuv and nearby kibbutz Dafna.

On the east side of the moshav flows the Banias stream, one of the main headwaters of the Jordan River.
