= Four Mothers (anti-war protest movement) =

1997 Israeli movement against the occupation of southern Lebanon

Four Mothers (Hebrew: ארבע אמהות arba imahot; the name is in reference to the Biblical matriarchs Sarah, Rebecca, Leah, and Rachel) was an Israeli protest movement founded in 1997 following the 1997 Israeli helicopter disaster by four women residents of northern Israel and mothers of soldiers serving in Lebanon. The goal was to bring about an Israeli withdrawal from the IDF's and SLA's security zone in Southern Lebanon. The Four Mothers movement was able to influence Israeli public opinion, and ultimately the Israeli government decided on IDF withdrawal from Southern Lebanon unilaterally, executed in May 2000.

== Background ==
In 1982, Israel decided to invade into Lebanon. In what was then called by the Israelis Operation Peace for Galilee, the goal was to root out Palestinian insurgents and support the Christian militias and the Free Lebanon State on the course of the Lebanese Civil War. Following the 1982-85 fighting, the IDF remained deployed in the area of southern Lebanon controlled by Lebanese Christian militias, which was declared by the Israelis as a security zone. Though most casualties on the course of consequent 1985-2000 conflict with Hezbollah were from the South Lebanon Army ranks, this deployment had claimed many casualties also from the IDF over the years. The most serious incident of IDF at the time being the helicopter disaster, which occurred on February 4, 1997, killing 73 soldiers from the Nahal Brigade, armored and Engineering fighters (188 Brigade and Battalion 601) and the helicopter crew.

Following the 1997 helicopter disaster, four women from Northern Israel, whom were mothers of soldiers who served in Lebanon, Rachel Ben Dor, Miri Sela, Ronit Nahmias and Zahara Antebi, decided to organize protest activities which will call for the unilateral and immediate withdrawal of Israeli forces from Lebanon. The purpose of the movement was to put public pressure on the Israeli government to withdraw from Lebanon, with or without a peace agreement, and thus to implement the United Nations Security Council Resolution 425, calling for the recognition of the territorial integrity and sovereignty of Lebanon, for the IDF to leave the area and the deployment of an international force in the region. The movement ignored the South Lebanon Army-IDF alliance understandings in regard to Israeli support for the South Lebanon security zone administration, emphasizing the human life cost of the IDF deployment.

Later, Ben-Dor became chairman of the movement and was joined by Orna Shimoni and others. Although called Four Mothers movement and was of a feminist base it was able to recruit men, including former soldiers who served in Lebanon. During its period of activities, when it was in the center of public discourse the movement numbered around five hundred members.

== Activity and public discourse ==
=== First steps ===
The first step of the movement was to hold a small demonstration at Mahanayim Junction. They protested against the fact that the Israeli government that had expressed its willingness to withdraw from Lebanon in 1985 did nothing in the 12 years to come to promote it. The demonstrators, whom were the base for the movement of four mothers, have rapidly gained media attention and many joined them. Within a few months thousands of people have signed a petition of solidarity with the movement, and on 5 July 1997 the founding conference was held in which several dozen of women and men participated. Following this, additional activity centers were frequently added across the country.

=== Message ===
Four Mothers had conveyed a message of concern for the "fighting children". This message was a line of thought that was not to be spoken out loud in Israel until then. Most of the protest movements in Israel until then dealt with the "territories" (Gaza, West Bank) and arguments in Israel revolved around whether to settle these areas and is it worth fighting for. Four Mothers did not claim this point of view and had set the goal of a unilateral withdrawal from Lebanon stemmed from their point of view of solely being concerned for the lives of the soldiers. The initial target audience was mothers of soldiers, since, in their view, they had a direct connection to the problem. The personal concern for the soldiers was the drive behind many activists. Subsequently, and gradually, the IDF claim that its presence in Lebanon secures the "Peace for Galilee" and had strengthened the impression among public opinion in Israel that being in Lebanon is what leads to the attacks against IDF soldiers in Lebanon. Other violent developments, like shooting on IDF forces beyond the security zone, counter shelling on Israeli population in the north also left the impression that it is only as result of the presence of Israeli soldiers in southern Lebanon. From here it was a short step to conclude that the resistance by Hezbollah actually expresses the will of the Lebanese people (mostly the Shias) against the occupation of south Lebanon, which has divided the Shiite people for years, those in the south and those north of the security zone. Such a view was laid out by Dan Steinberg in an essay that was delivered to the Israeli press called "The truth about the lie of Lebanon".

=== Course of action ===
Four Mothers movement had developed a strategy to achieve their ultimate goal and its actions included government level and political activities on the one hand, and the public sphere on the other. The movement felt it had to find the best and most effective way for achieving its goal and therefore its public activities turned to the broader public opinion and was mainly characterized by a broad and strong connection with the media on all fronts. The movement's PR became a widespread system. The movement's activities included marches and demonstrations across the country, signing petitions, attending conferences and political TV shows, and even political protests in front of the offices of heads of state and various decision makers. The movement also received media coverage overseas and articles about it was published in many media outlets around the world. Moreover, the movement had received may letters of support from women and peace organizations. On the government level, however, it was a much more of a relaxed front, and was characterized by an attempt to garner support for their goals by continuing to pressure the ministers and MKs through conversations and dialogue .

Similarly, the movement chose to cooperate with other movements, such as "Withdrawal from Lebanon" by MK Yossi Beilin and the "Religious women for the sanctity of life", whom basically advocated the same objectives, in order to increase Four Mothers support base. However, the Four Mothers movement was characterized by the fact that it was not related to any of the political parties in Israel and neither desired to be defined as belonging to one political camp or another.

Four Mothers tried to arouse public interest without disturbing public order, and subsequently differences arose among movement members, and some of the activists tried to establish a breakaway movement of their own whose activity failed. Despite the delays, and thanks to extensive activity, the movement had become an influential player in Israeli public life and a meaningful social phenomenon.

=== Public discourse ===
Four Mothers tried to engage in the public sphere in places where it was perceived to be "a man's world" in Israeli society - the Israeli army, and against all odds was able to raise the issue of unilateral withdrawal to the level of a national agenda, to arouse public opinion and exert massive pressure on decision makers. As the public debate around the movement intensified, the leaders of Four Mothers became regular participants in the Israeli political discourse and have turned into the leaders of the whole struggle for the withdrawal from Lebanon. As long as the goals were not achieved, the movement continued its activities on the two levels, and continued to raise awareness and civil protest. It started out without any political power, budget, and were not taken seriously by the decision makers. But over time, its power intensified due to the wide media coverage it had received. Four Mothers movement was a peripheral movement that has come to symbolize the struggle and later became one of the symbols of Israel's withdrawal from Lebanon.

The movement sparked social controversy and large parts of the Israeli public did not agree with the agenda presented by Four Mothers. At first the movement took a lot of heat and were belittled since its leaders were women. Women of the movement were perceived as having disorientation on security affairs and its activities perceived as a selfish act of defeatism that do not match the values of Israeli society which perceived the IDF and its fighters as a supreme value. The appeal to the feminine and maternal feelings did not always succeed and female politicians and bereaved mothers sometimes saw in Four Mothers a danger to Israeli society. Additionally, it was feared of a demoralization of Israeli soldiers, particularly in Lebanon, but also in other areas of conflicts. Various statements against the movement were made by opponents, among them, reserve Brigadier General Rafi Noy, who claimed the movement activities endangered the security of IDF soldiers, and by commander of Golani Brigade, Colonel Shmuel Zakai, who called the movement "four rags".

=== The withdrawal from Lebanon and ending the activity ===
On May 24, 2000, three years after the establishment of the movement, the IDF withdrew from Lebanon by the orders of Prime Minister Ehud Barak. As soon as the Four Mothers organization realized that there is a mutual purpose between them and the Prime Minister, the public activity decreased and along with withdrawal itself, the Four Mothers movement was disbanded since it felt it had achieved its goals and as a social organization has accomplished its mission. Nevertheless, current protest movements in Israel are inspired by the activity of the four Mothers movement, and veteran activists from the movement had established new movements such as: "Mabat La'Ofek" for dialogue with the settlers, "The seventh day" and "The Fifth Mother".
