= List of media adaptations of the Legend of the White Snake =

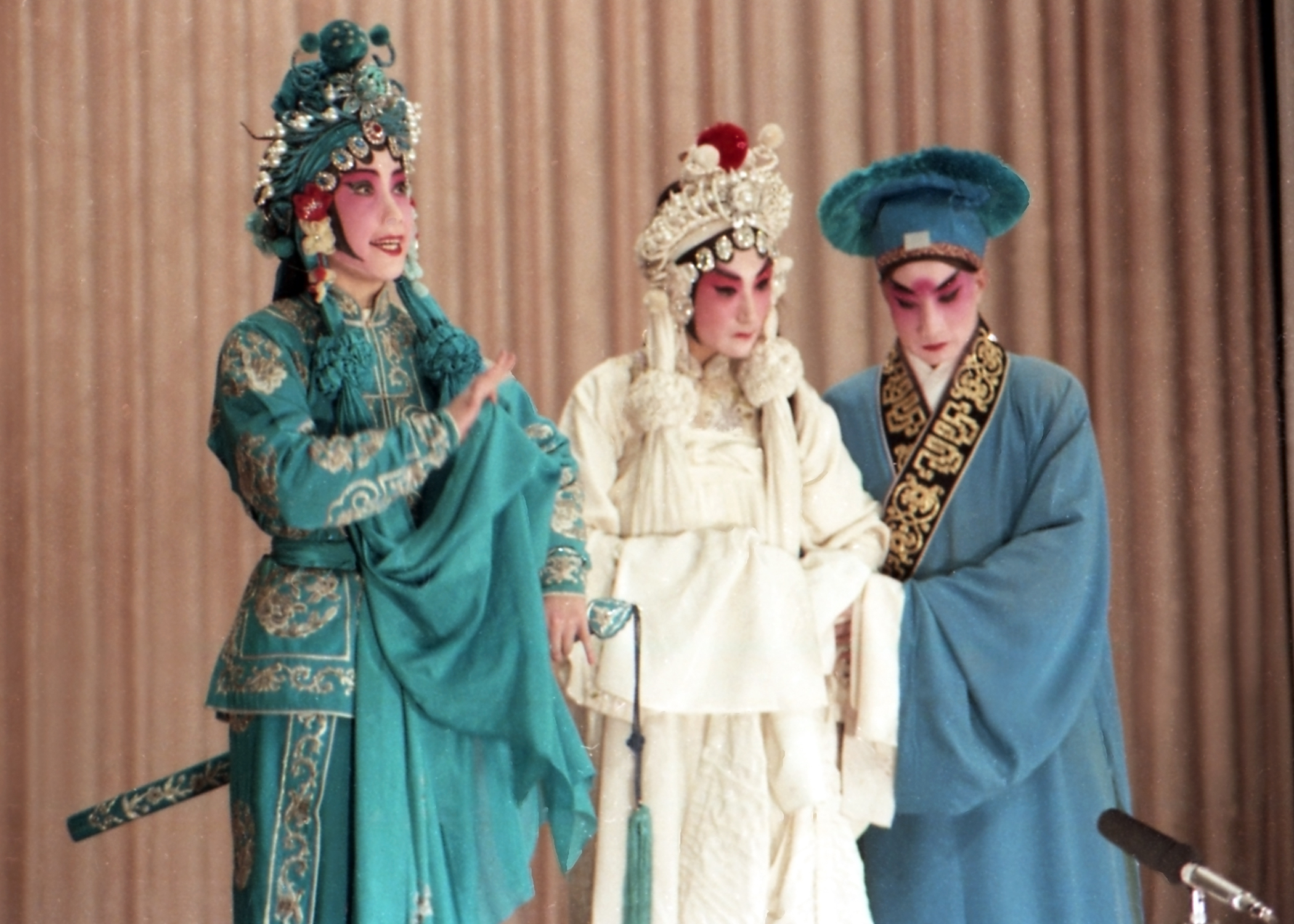
Portraying the "Legend of the White Snake" in Peking opera.

The Legend of the White Snake, also known as Madame White Snake, is a Chinese legend and one of China's Four Great Folktales of Chinese literature. Stories and characters were widely used, especially in Beijing opera, and has been adapted many times in modern film, television, stage, and other media. Some characters are worshiped as deities in Chinese folk religion.

== Operas and stage plays ==
- The story has been performed numerous times in Peking opera, Cantonese opera and other Chinese operas.
- Stage musical adaptations in Hong Kong include:

Pai Niang Niang, created by Joseph Koo and Wong Jim. Premiering in 1972, it marked the start of the musical theater industry in Hong Kong.
White Snake, Green Snake (2005), created by Christopher Wong
The Legend of the White Snake, created by Leon Ko and Chris Shum

- Taiwan's Cloud Gate Dance Theater performed a modern dance interpretation of Madam White Snake in the 1970s.
- In 2010, an opera based on the legend, Madame White Snake, with music by Zhou Long and a libretto by Cerise Lim Jacobs, premiered in a production by Opera Boston. It won the 2011 Pulitzer Prize in Music.
- In 2012, the Oregon Shakespeare Festival in Ashland, Oregon, staged an adaptation by Mary Zimmerman.

== Films ==
- Madam White Snake (Bai she zhuan shang ji (1926) and Bai she zhuan xia ji (1926)), a lost two-part silent film. It was an early production by the Shaw Brothers, directed by Shao Zuiweng.
- Ouw Peh Tjoa (水淹金山, also known by the Malay-language title Doea Siloeman Oeler Poeti en Item), a 1934 film from Dutch East Indies (now Indonesia). It was directed and produced by The Teng Chun.
- The Legend of the White Snake (白蛇傳), a 1939 Chinese film made by Xinhua Studio.
- Ugetsu (雨月物語), a 1953 film by Kenji Mizoguchi, is based on Akinari Ueda's version of the story, "The Lust of the White Serpent," although the finished film shows no serpents and bears little resemblance to the legend.
- The Legend of the White Serpent (白夫人の妖恋), a 1956 Japanese film made by Toho in collaboration with Hong Kong's Shaw Brothers Studio. It was notable for being the first Toho tokusatsu (special effects) film made in color.
- The White Snake Enchantress (白蛇傳), the first color anime feature film, was released in Japan in 1958. The U.S. title was Panda and the Magic Serpent. It was also one of the rare instances where Xiaoqing is represented as a fish demon and not a snake demon.
- Madam White Snake, a 1960 South Korean film starring Choi Eun-hee and Shin Seong-il
- Madam White Snake, a 1962 film produced by Hong Kong's Shaw Brothers Studio. This version is a Huangmei opera directed by Yueh Feng, with music by Wang Fu-ling on a libretto by Li Chun-ching.
- Snake Woman's Marriage (白蛇大鬧天宮), a 1975 Taiwanese film directed by Sun Yang.
- Love of the White Snake (真白蛇傳), a 1978 Hong Kong/Taiwan film starring Brigitte Lin, Chin Tse-min, and Charlie Chin.
- Legend of the White Snake (白蛇传), a 1980 Chinese opera film, estimated to have drawn a box office audience of 700 million admissions in China, the highest in Chinese box office history.
- Green Snake (青蛇), a 1993 Hong Kong film directed by Tsui Hark, starring Maggie Cheung, Joey Wong, Vincent Zhao and Wu Hsing-kuo, which depicts the story from the perspective of the Xiao Qing and lays emphasis on their snake-like origins and characteristics.
- The Sorcerer and the White Snake (白蛇傳說), a 2011 3D film, starring Jet Li, Huang Shengyi, Raymond Lam and Charlene Choi.
- The Legend of Lady White Snake: A Tribute to the Spirit of Alexander McQueen, a short film starring Daphne Guinness, directed by Indrani Pal-Chaudhuri, with creative direction/styling by GK Reid, produced by Markus Klinko and Indrani, Daphne Guinness and GK Reid. Written by Indrani, inspired by the ancient Chinese legend, with a poem by Neil Gaiman, the film is set in contemporary New York City. Previews of the film are featured in the Daphne Guinness Exhibition at the Museum of the Fashion Institute from September 16, 2011 through January 6, 2012.
- My Girlfriend is a White Snake (我的蛇精女友), a 2017 film by Firewin Pictures, reprises the huang mei opera of "New Legend of the White Snake", which was a Taiwanese television (TTV) series of this classic Chinese folk tale.
- White Snake (白蛇传·情) is a 2019 modern cinematic presentation of the hugely popular legend, faithfully preserved by Cantonese opera and enriched with modern music.
- White Snake (白蛇：缘起) is a 2019 Chinese/American computer-animated movie based on the tale. The adaptation is an action fantasy romance.
  - White Snake II: Tribulations of the Green Snake (白蛇2：青蛇劫起) is the 2020 sequel to the 2019 film.
- White Snake 3: Afloat is the 2024 movie between the 1st and 2nd movie.

== Television ==
- Leifeng Pagoda (雷峰塔), a 1977 Taiwanese television series.
- Legend of the White Snake (白蛇傳), a 1985 Taiwanese television series.
- The Serpentine Romance (奇幻人間世), a 1990 television series produced by Hong Kong's TVB, starring Maggie Chan, Maggie Siu and Hugo Ng.
- New Legend of Madame White Snake / The Legend of White Snake (新白娘子傳奇), a 1992 Taiwanese television series starring Angie Chiu, Cecilia Yip and Maggie Chen.
- The Legendary White Snake (白蛇後傳之人間有愛), a 1995 Singaporean television series starring Geoffrey Tso, Lin Yisheng, Terence Cao, Lina Ng, Ding Lan, Liu Qiulian and Wang Changli.
- My Date with a Vampire (我和殭屍有個約會), a Hong Kong television series produced by ATV. The series made extensive use of the story, reusing it in the first season (1998) and a modified version in the second season (1999).
- Madam White Snake / Legend of the Snake Spirits (白蛇新傳), a 2001 Taiwanese and Singapore co-produced television series starring Fann Wong, Christopher Lee, Zhang Yuyan and Vincent Jiao.
- Madame White Snake (白蛇傳), a 2005 Chinese television series starring Liu Tao, Pan Yueming, Chen Zihan and Liu Xiaofeng.
- The Legend of White Snake Sequel / Tale of the Oriental Serpent (白蛇後傳), a 2009 sequel to Madame White Snake (2005), starring Fu Miao, Qiu Xinzhi, Shi Zhaoqi, Chi Shuai and Cecilia Liu.
- Love of the Millennium (又見白娘子), a loose sequel to New Legend of Madame White Snake (1992), starring Zuo Xiaoqing, Queenie Tai, Ren Quan and Shen Xiaohai.
- The Destiny of White Snake (2017), a loose adaptation of the classic folk tale starring Yang Zi and Ren Jialun.
- The Legend of the White Snake (2019), a web series adaption of the classic folk tale starring Ju Jingyi and Yu Menglong.
- New Madam White Snake (2019), a web drama adaptation of the classic folk tale starring Sun Xiaoxiao, Lu Hong and Zhang Tianyang.

== Others ==
- Lu Xun penned an essay "Comments on the Collapse of the Leifeng Pagoda" (论雷峰塔的倒掉) in 1924, celebrating its collapse as a symbolic blow to feudalistic and conservative forces, symbolized by the monk Fahai and his interference in the romance between Xu and Bai.
- In the West, there have been children's picture book adaptations of the legend, written by Western authors and illustrated by Chinese artists, including:
  - Legend of the White Serpent by A. Fullarton Prior, illustrated by Kwan Sang-Mei
  - Lady White Snake: A Tale From Chinese Opera, by Aaron Shepard, illustrated by Song Nang Zhang
- The novella The Devil Wives of Li Fong by E. Hoffmann Price is based on the story.
- The legend is a major part of the fantasy novella "Fighting Demons" by S.L. Huang.
- In 2009, Dantès Dailiang made use of the Chinese lyrics of the Legend of White Snake for his song La muse aux lèvres rouges (红唇之缪斯女神), recorded in his LP Dailiang.
- In 2012 the Swatch company launched a model named The legend of white snake in honor of the Chinese new year, the year of the snake. The watch's hands are white and green snakes.
- Scale-Bright (2014) by Benjanun Sriduangkaew is a novella that transposes the Legend of the White Snake to contemporary Hong Kong.
- DC Comics used a variation on this tale for the origin story for the Wonder-Woman of China in an issue of New Super-Man, released in August 2017.
- The White Snake Temple in Taiwan is dedicated to Bai Suzhen.
- A PC game, Mizuchi 白蛇心傳 by Aikasa Collective, was released on Steam in 2020. It is a Yuri version inspired by the Legend of White Snake. The game was later picked up by publishers for release on Switch, PS4 and PS5 in 2024.
- In the 2022 mobile game Dislyte, Bai Liuli is a Rare Esper with the powers of the White Snake.
- Suzhen's krait, a species of krait that was first identified in 2021, was named after Bai Suzhen in honor of her courage in pursuing true love and her kindness towards people.
- Singaporean writer Amanda Lee Koe's 2024 novel Sister Snake adapted the legend, portraying Bai Suzhen and Xiaoqing in human form as immortal sworn sisters who became estranged over time; Xiaoqing is living in New York, while Bai Suzhen is a politician's wife in Singapore.
