= List of highest-grossing films in China =

This is a list of the highest-grossing films in mainland China. Most of the data below is provided by EntGroup's China Box Office (CBO) website, with the gross in Chinese yuan.

== Highest-grossing films by box office revenue ==
=== Top 50 all-time highest-grossing films ===
Films that are currently in cinema

Rank	Title	Total gross (CN¥)	Country / Region	Year
1	Ne Zha 2	15,462,580,000	China	2025
2	The Battle at Lake Changjin	5,775,750,000	China	2021
3	Wolf Warrior 2	5,688,740,000	China	2017
4	Hi, Mom	5,413,300,000	China	2021
5	Ne Zha	5,035,020,000	China	2019
6	The Wandering Earth	4,687,710,000	China	2019
7	Zootopia 2	4,594,840,000	United States	2025
8	Full River Red	4,545,890,000	China	2023
9	Detective Chinatown 3	4,522,350,000	China	2021
10	Pegasus 3	4,430,743,100	China	2026
11	Avengers: Endgame	4,250,409,700	United States	2019
12	The Battle at Lake Changjin II	4,071,140,000	China	2022
13	The Wandering Earth 2	4,030,270,000	China	2023
14	No More Bets	3,851,180,000	China	2023
15	Operation Red Sea	3,652,540,000	China, Hong Kong	2018
16	Detective Chinatown 1900	3,615,760,000	China	2025
17	Lost in the Stars	3,526,690,000	China	2023
18	Yolo	3,424,870,000	China	2024
19	Detective Chinatown 2	3,397,690,000	China	2018
20	The Mermaid	3,397,180,000	China, Hong Kong	2016
21	Pegasus 2	3,390,890,000	China	2024
22	Successor	3,329,800,000	China	2024
23	My People, My Country	3,176,390,000	China, Hong Kong	2019
24	Moon Man	3,105,330,000	China	2022
25	The Eight Hundred	3,102,320,000	China	2020
26	Dying to Survive	3,099,960,000	China	2018
27	Dead to Rights	3,021,770,000	China	2025
28	The Captain	2,913,710,000	China	2019
29	My People, My Homeland	2,828,960,000	China	2020
30	The Fate of the Furious	2,670,960,000	United States	2017
31	Creation of the Gods I: Kingdom of Storms	2,637,960,000	China	2023
32	Too Cool to Kill	2,630,450,000	China	2022
33	Hello Mr. Billionaire	2,547,570,000	China	2018
34	Furious 7	2,446,310,000	United States	2015
35	Monster Hunt	2,441,460,000	China, Hong Kong	2015
36	Article 20	2,436,080,000	China	2024
37	Avengers: Infinity War	2,390,537,300	United States	2018
38	Once Upon a Time in the Middle East	2,390,008,400	China	2026
39	Kung Fu Soccer	2,348,749,400	China	2026
40	Monster Hunt 2	2,237,150,000	China, Hong Kong	2018
41	Crazy Alien	2,214,710,000	China	2019
42	Never Say Never	2,208,710,000	China	2023
43	Never Say Die	2,201,750,000	China	2017
44	All Wishes Come True!	2,058,051,600	China	2026
45	Aquaman	2,013,200,000	United States	2018
46	Dear You	2,007,625,400	China	2026
47	Boonie Bears: Time Twist	1,989,490,000	China	2024
48	Transformers: Age of Extinction	1,977,520,000	United States	2014
49	Evil Unbound	1,947,735,600	China	2025
50	The Ex-File 3: The Return of the Exes	1,941,740,000	China	2017

=== Top 20 foreign films ===
Rank	Title	Total gross (CN¥)	Country / Region	Year
1	Zootopia 2	4,594,840,000	United States	2025
2	Avengers: Endgame	4,250,409,700	United States	2019
3	The Fate of the Furious	2,670,960,000	United States	2017
4	Furious 7	2,446,310,000	United States	2015
5	Avengers: Infinity War	2,390,540,000	United States	2018
6	Aquaman	2,013,200,000	United States	2018
7	Transformers: Age of Extinction	1,977,520,000	United States	2014
8	Venom	1,870,680,000	United States	2018
9	Avatar	1,712,860,000	United States	2010
10	Avatar: The Way of Water	1,697,500,000	United States	2022
11	Jurassic World: Fallen Kingdom	1,695,880,000	United States	2018
12	Spider-Man: Brand New Day	1,588,335,300	United States	2026
13	Transformers: The Last Knight	1,551,240,000	United States	2017
14	Zootopia	1,534,530,000	United States	2016
15	Warcraft	1,472,300,000	United States	2016
16	Avengers: Age of Ultron	1,464,390,000	United States	2015
17	Fast & Furious Presents: Hobbs & Shaw	1,434,300,000	United States	2019
18	Jurassic World	1,420,730,000	United States	2015
19	Spider-Man: Far From Home	1,417,680,000	United States	2019
20	Ready Player One	1,396,660,000	United States	2018

== Highest-grossing films by box office admissions ==
Films that are currently in cinema

Chinese title	English title	Year	Admissions (est. ticket sales)	Country / Region	Ref
白蛇传 (Bai she zhuan)	Legend of the White Snake	1980	700,000,000	China	
喜盈門 (Xi ying men)	In-Laws / Full House of Joy	1981	650,000,000	China	
武当 (Wudang)	Wudang / The Undaunted Wudang	1983	610,000,000	China	
保密局的槍聲 (Bao mi ju de qiang sheng)	Gunshots in the CIB	1979	600,000,000	China	
405谋杀案 (405 mou sha an)	Murder in 405	1980	600,000,000	China	
少林寺弟子 (Shao lin si di zi)	The Disciple of the Shaolin Temple / Shaolin Brothers	1983	520,000,000	China, Hong Kong	
少林寺 (Shao lin si)	Shaolin Temple	1982	500,000,000	China, Hong Kong	
七品芝麻官 (Qi pin zhi ma guan)	Sesame Official	1980	500,000,000	China	
武林志 (Wu lin zhi)	Deadly Fury / Pride's Deadly Fury	1984	500,000,000	China	
从奴隶到将军 (Cong Nu Li Dao Jiang Jun)	Cong Nu Li Dao Jiang Jun	1979	470,000,000	China	
西安事变 (Xi'an shi bian)	The Xi'an Incident	1981	450,000,000	China	
追捕 (Zhuībǔ)	Manhunt	1978	400,000,000	Japan	
神秘的大佛 (Shen mi de da fo)	Mysterious Buddha	1980	400,000,000	China	
吉鸿昌 (Ji Hongchang)	Ji Hongchang	1979	380,000,000	China	
开枪，为他送行 (Kai Qiang, Wei Ta Song Xing)	Kai Qiang, Wei Ta Song Xing	1982	330,000,000	China	
哪吒之魔童闹海 (Na zha zhi mo tong nao hai)	Ne Zha 2	2025	325,000,000	China	
地道战 (Dì dào zhàn)	Tunnel War	1965	300,000,000+	China	
大篷车 (Dà péngchē)	Caravan	1979	300,000,000	India	
杜十娘 (Du Shiniang)	Du Shiniang	1981	260,000,000	China	
佩剑将军 (Pei jian jiang jun)	A General Wearing the Sword	1983	260,000,000	China	
自古英雄出少年 (Zi gu ying xiong chu shao nian)	Little Heroes / Young Heroes	1983	260,000,000	China, Hong Kong	
火烧圆明园 (Huo shao yuan ming yuan)	The Burning of Imperial Palace	1983	240,000,000	China, Hong Kong	
木棉袈裟 (Mui mien ka sha)	Holy Robe of the Shaolin Temple	1985	200,000,000	Hong Kong	
飞来的女婿 (Fei lai de nü xu)	The Flying Son-in-Law	1982	199,500,000	China	
蓝盾保险箱 (Lan dun bao xian xiang)	Blue Shield Safe	1983	170,000,000	China	
少年犯 (Shao nian fan)	Juvenile Delinquents / Innocent Teenagers	1985	161,000,000	China, Hong Kong	
战狼2 (Zhan lang 2)	Wolf Warrior 2	2017	160,000,000	China	
庐山恋 (Lúshān Liàn)	Romance on Lushan Mountain	1980	140,000,000+	China	
哪吒之魔童降世 (Nézhā zhī Mótóng Jiàngshì)	Ne Zha	2019	140,000,000	China	
少林小子 (Shao lin xiao zi)	Shaolin Temple 2: Kids from Shaolin	1984	140,000,000	China, Hong Kong	
特殊身份的警官 (Tèshū shēnfèn de jǐngguān)	A Policeman with a Special Identity	1982	130,000,000	China	
长津湖 (Chang jin hu)	The Battle at Lake Changjin	2021	125,000,000	China	
你好，李焕英 (Nǐ hǎo, Lǐ Huànyīng)	Hi, Mom	2021	121,000,000	China	
大上海1937 (Da Shang Hai 1937)	Great Shanghai 1937	1986	121,000,000	China, Hong Kong	
人到中年 (Ren dao zhong nian)	At Middle Age	1982	120,000,000	China	
蛇案 (She an)	She an	1983	120,000,000	China	
疯狂动物城2 (Fēngkuáng dòngwù chéng 2)	Zootopia 2	2025	117,000,000	United States	
南北少林 (Nan Bei Shao Lin)	Shaolin Temple 3: Martial Arts of Shaolin	1986	116,000,000	China, Hong Kong	
海市蜃楼 (Hai shi shen lou)	Mirage	1987	113,000,000	China, Hong Kong	
咱们的牛百岁 (Zan men de niu bai sui)	Our Niu Baisui	1983	110,000,000	China	
唐人街探案 2	Detective Chinatown 2	2018	105,500,000	China	
流浪地球 (Liúlàng dìqiú)	The Wandering Earth	2019	105,314,500	China	(Note: 105 million tickets for original release. 314,500 tickets for The Wandering Earth: Beyond 2020 Special Edition.)
流浪者 (Liúlàng zhě)	Awaara / The Vagabond	1955	100,000,000+	India	
望乡 (Wàng Xiāng)	Sandakan No. 8	1978	100,000,000+	Japan	
狐狸的故事 (Húlí de gùshì)	Kitakitsune Monogatari / The Glacier Fox	1979	100,000,000+	Japan	
周恩來 (Zhou Enlai)	Zhou Enlai	1992	100,000,000	China	
东方剑 (Dong fang jian)	Dong fang jian	1982	100,000,000	China	

== Timeline of highest-grossing films ==
Up until the 1980s, the Chinese box office was typically reported in terms of box office admissions (ticket sales), rather than gross revenue. The film with the highest ticket sales in China is Legend of the White Snake (1980) with an estimated 700 million admissions, followed by In-Laws (Full House of Joy) with 650 million ticket sales. The foreign film with the highest ticket sales in China was the 1976 Japanese film Kimi yo Fundo no Kawa o Watare (Manhunt), which had its Chinese release in 1978 and sold more than 330 million tickets in China, followed by the Indian film Caravan (1971) which had its Chinese release in 1979 and sold about 300 million tickets in China. Hollywood film releases were relatively rare in China up until First Blood (1982), which had its Chinese release in 1985, and went on to sell 76 million tickets, the highest for a Hollywood film in China up until 2018.

Zhou Enlai was released in 1992 and became China's highest-grossing film with CN¥270 million. China began releasing box office gross revenue results for foreign non-Chinese films in November 1994, upon the release of The Fugitive (1993). In 1995, the Hong Kong action film Rumble in the Bronx, directed by Stanley Tong and starring Jackie Chan, became the all-time highest-grossing foreign film in China, where it grossed CN¥110 million; it is not considered a domestic film as it was produced in Hong Kong (then a British Dependent Territory). It was above the year's highest domestic Chinese film, Jiang Wen's In the Heat of the Sun with ¥50 million. Stanley Tong and Jackie Chan surpassed their own record with the Hong Kong action film Police Story 4: First Strike (1996), which grossed CN¥112 million in China. In 1998, Titanic (directed by James Cameron) became the all-time highest-grossing film to be released in China, with a then-unprecedented ¥360 million. In 2002, Hero became the second highest-grossing domestic film, with CN¥250 million. China's first domestic film to breach ¥360 million was released in 2009, The Founding of a Republic. In 2015, Monster Hunt became the first domestic film in 17 years to become the overall highest-grossing film in China, earning ¥2.44 billion.

=== High-grossing films by year ===
Since the 1990s, the most represented filmmaker in the chart has been American film director Michael Bay with four films to his credit, occupying the top spot in 2001, 2007, 2011, and 2014. Among domestic filmmakers, Feng Xiaogang (1999, 2003, 2008), Zhang Yimou (2002, 2006, 2023), Stephen Chow (2004, 2013, 2016), Chen Kaige (2005, 2021, 2022) and Dante Lam (2018, 2021, 2022) are the most represented with three films each.

Films that are currently in cinema (as of February 2025)

Highest-grossing films by year of release
Year	Title	Revenue	Admissions	Country / Region	Ref
1939	Children of China	Unknown	9,000,000	China	
1950	Iron Soldier	Unknown	11,000,000	China	
1951	The White Haired Girl	Unknown	6,000,000	China	
1954	A Torn Lily	Unknown	8,722,000	Hong Kong	
1955	Awaara (The Vagabond)	Unknown	100,000,000+ (Note: Including later 1978 re-release)	India	
1956	The Peerless Beauty	Unknown	11,645,000	Hong Kong	
1962	The Red Shoes	Unknown	44,000,000	United Kingdom	
1965	Tunnel War	Unknown	300,000,000+	China	
1973	Maihua guniang (The Flower Seller)	Unknown	6,000,000	North Korea	
1978	Manhunt	Unknown	400,000,000	Japan	
1979	Gunshots in the CIB (Bao mi ju de qiang sheng)	¥180,000,000	600,000,000	China	
1980	Legend of the White Snake (Bai she zhuan)	Unknown	700,000,000	China	
1981	In-Laws (Full House of Joy)	¥100,000,000	650,000,000	China	
1982	Shaolin Temple	¥161,578,014	500,000,000	China, Hong Kong	
1983	Wudang (The Undaunted Wudang)	Unknown	610,000,000	China	
1984	Deadly Fury (Pride's Deadly Fury)	Unknown	500,000,000	China	
1985	Holy Robe of the Shaolin Temple (Mui mien ka sha)	Unknown	200,000,000	Hong Kong	
1986	Great Shanghai 1937 (Da Shang Hai 1937)	Unknown	121,000,000	China, Hong Kong	
1987	Mirage (Hai shi shen lou)	Unknown	113,000,000	China, Hong Kong	
1988	Yellow River Fighter	Unknown	130,000,000	China	
1989	The Birth of New China	¥100,000,000	Unknown	China	
1990	My Beloved	¥94,000,000	Unknown	Taiwan	
1992	Zhou Enlai	¥270,000,000	100,000,000	China	
1994	The Fugitive	¥25,800,000	Unknown	United States	
1995	Rumble in the Bronx	¥110,000,000	Unknown	Hong Kong	
1996	Police Story 4: First Strike	¥112,000,000	Unknown	Hong Kong	
1997	The Lost World: Jurassic Park	¥72,100,000	Unknown	United States	
1997	The Opium War	¥72,000,000+	14,000,000	China	
1998	Titanic	¥360,000,000	40,039,923	United States	
1999	Be There or Be Square	¥43,000,000	Unknown	China	
2000	Final Decision	¥120,000,000	Unknown	China	
2001	Pearl Harbor	¥105,000,000	Unknown	United States	
2002	Hero	¥250,000,000	Unknown	China	
2003	Cell Phone	¥56,000,000	Unknown	China	
2004	Kung Fu Hustle	¥173,000,000	Unknown	China, Hong Kong	
2005	The Promise	¥181,000,000	Unknown	China	
2006	Curse of the Golden Flower	¥291,000,000	7,710,000	China	
2007	Transformers	¥282,000,000	9,310,000	United States	
2008	If You Are the One	¥325,000,000	9,500,000	China	
2009	2012	¥466,000,000	17,623,604	United States	
2010	Avatar	¥1,339,860,000	49,179,036	United States	(Note: 38,412,018 tickets before 2021. 10,767,018 tickets with 2021 re-release.)
2011	Transformers: Dark of the Moon	¥1,071,570,000	25,652,900	United States	
2012	Lost in Thailand	¥1,271,950,000	39,281,300	China	
2013	Journey to the West: Conquering the Demons	¥1,246,990,000	31,050,300	China, Hong Kong	
2014	Transformers: Age of Extinction	¥1,977,520,000	47,417,700	United States	
2015	Monster Hunt	¥2,440,020,000	65,689,800	China, Hong Kong	
2016	The Mermaid	¥3,392,110,000	92,642,600	China, Hong Kong	
2017	Wolf Warrior 2	¥5,679,290,000	160,000,000	China	
2018	Operation Red Sea	¥3,650,790,000	93,610,000	China, Hong Kong	
2019	Ne Zha	¥5,013,350,000	140,000,000	China	
2020	The Eight Hundred	¥3,102,320,000	80,919,900	China	
2021	The Battle at Lake Changjin	¥5,775,750,000	125,000,000	China	
2022	The Battle at Lake Changjin II	¥4,067,330,000	82,570,900	China	
2023	Full River Red	¥4,545,890,000	91,816,500	China	
2024	YOLO	¥3,295,970,000	71,333,500	China	
2025	Ne Zha 2	¥15,462,580,000	325,000,000	China	
2026	Pegasus 3	¥4,430,743,100	94,761,400	China	

=== Box office milestones ===
Milestone	Title	Total gross	Country / Region	Date reached	Ref
5,000,000 tickets	The White Haired Girl	6,000,000 tickets	China	1951	
10,000,000 tickets	Iron Soldier	11,000,000 tickets	China	1952	
20,000,000 tickets	Awaara (The Vagabond)	100,000,000+ tickets	India	1955	
30,000,000 tickets	The Red Shoes	44,000,000 tickets	United Kingdom	1962	
40,000,000 tickets	The Red Shoes	44,000,000 tickets	United Kingdom	1963	
50,000,000 tickets	Awaara (The Vagabond)	100,000,000+ tickets	India	1978	
100,000,000 tickets	Awaara (The Vagabond)	100,000,000+ tickets	India	1978	
200,000,000 tickets	Tunnel War	300,000,000+ tickets	China	1978	
300,000,000 tickets	Tunnel War	300,000,000+ tickets	China	1978	
400,000,000 tickets	Manhunt	400,000,000 tickets	Japan	1979	
500,000,000 tickets	Gunshots in the CIB	600,000,000 tickets	China	1979	
600,000,000 tickets	Gunshots in the CIB	600,000,000 tickets	China	1980	
700,000,000 tickets	Legend of the White Snake	700,000,000 tickets	China	1985	
¥100,000,000	Gunshots in the CIB	¥180,000,000	China	1980	
¥200,000,000	Zhou Enlai	¥270,000,000	China	1992	
¥300,000,000	Titanic	¥360,000,000	United States	1998-02-01	
¥400,000,000	Transformers: Revenge of the Fallen	¥403,665,000	United States	2009-08-02	
¥500,000,000	Avatar	¥1,160,500,000	United States	2010-01-17	
¥1,000,000,000	Avatar	¥1,160,500,000	United States	2010-02-08	
¥2,000,000,000	Furious 7	¥2,426,590,000	United States	2015-04-26	
¥2,400,000,000	Monster Hunt	¥2,440,020,000	China, Hong Kong	2015-09-06	
¥3,000,000,000	The Mermaid	¥3,392,100,000	China, Hong Kong	2016-02-26	
¥4,000,000,000	Wolf Warrior 2	¥5,679,290,000	China	2017-08-13	
¥5,000,000,000	Wolf Warrior 2	¥5,679,290,000	China	2017-08-19	
¥5,500,000,000	The Battle at Lake Changjin	¥5,775,750,000	China	2021-10-31	
¥6,000,000,000	Ne Zha 2	¥15,462,580,000	China	2025-02-06	
¥7,000,000,000	Ne Zha 2	¥15,462,580,000	China	2025-02-08	
¥8,000,000,000	Ne Zha 2	¥15,462,580,000	China	2025-02-10	
¥9,000,000,000	Ne Zha 2	¥15,462,580,000	China	2025-02-12	
¥10,000,000,000	Ne Zha 2	¥15,462,580,000	China	2025-02-14	
¥11,000,000,000	Ne Zha 2	¥15,462,580,000	China	2025-02-15	
¥12,000,000,000	Ne Zha 2	¥15,462,580,000	China	2025-02-17	
¥13,000,000,000	Ne Zha 2	¥15,462,580,000	China	2025-02-22	
¥14,000,000,000	Ne Zha 2	¥15,462,580,000	China	2025-02-28	
¥15,000,000,000	Ne Zha 2	¥15,462,580,000	China	2025-03-14	

== Highest-grossing openings ==
A list of the highest-grossing openings for films in China. Since many films do not open on Fridays in China, the 'opening' is taken to be the gross between the first day of release and the first Sunday following the movie's release.

Rank	Film	Year	Opening (US$)	Ref
1	Ne Zha 2	2025	$431,280,000	
2	Detective Chinatown 3	2021	$398,000,000	
3	The Battle at Lake Changjin II (Water Gate Bridge)	2022	$398,000,000	
4	Avengers: Endgame	2019	$330,528,623	
5	The Wandering Earth	2019	$298,110,095	
6	The Mermaid	2016	$274,049,983	
7	Zootopia 2	2025	$272,000,000	
8	The Captain	2019	$251,966,468	
9	The Battle at Lake Changjin	2021	$235,000,000	
10	Too Cool to Kill	2022	$217,000,000	
11	Crazy Alien	2019	$214,749,033	
12	Dying to Survive	2018	$200,837,145	
13	Avengers: Infinity War	2018	$200,486,738	
14	Hi, Mom	2021	$195,000,000	
15	The Fate of the Furious	2017	$193,936,620	
16	Monster Hunt 2	2018	$189,784,760	(Note: According to EntGroup, Monster Hunt 2 grossed CN¥1,204,450,000 between the first Friday and Sunday of its release in China in February 2018. According to the 2018 exchange rate during the weekend of release, this is equivalent to $189,784,760.)
17	Furious 7	2015	$182,400,000	
18	My People, My Homeland	2020	$157,500,000	
19	Detective Chinatown 2	2018	$156,069,583	(Note: According to EntGroup, Detective Chinatown 2 grossed CN¥990,480,000 between the first Friday and Sunday of its release in China in February 2018. According to the 2018 exchange rate during the weekend of release, this is equivalent to $156,069,583.)
20	Pegasus	2019	$154,451,898	

=== Opening records ===
These are the films that, when first released, set the opening record in China. Since many films do not open on Fridays in China, the 'opening' is taken to be the gross between the first day of release and the first Sunday following the movie's release.

Year	Title	Opening (US$)	Ref
2016	The Mermaid	$274,049,983	
2019	Avengers: Endgame	$330,528,623	
2021	Detective Chinatown 3	$398,000,000	
2025	Ne Zha 2	$431,280,000	

=== Opening days ===
Title	Release date	Daily opening gross (CN¥)			3 days (CN¥)
Title	Release date	Day 1	Day 2	Day 3	3 days (CN¥)
Detective Chinatown 3	2021-02-12	1,018,220,000	818,291,800	749,689,500	2,586,201,300
The Battle at Lake Changjin II	2022-02-01	941,449,100	487,519,600	439,736,200	1,868,704,900
Ne Zha 2	2025-01-29	487,875,100	480,771,200	619,705,100	1,588,351,400
Avengers: Endgame	2019-04-14	728,130,000	317,631,100	425,111,600	1,470,872,700
The Fate of the Furious	2017-04-14	479,708,400	487,519,600	384,751,600	1,351,979,600
Avengers: Infinity War	2018-05-11	446,505,900	493,562,100	331,905,600	1,271,973,600
Monster Hunt 2	2018-02-16	547,000,208	372,506,500	285,087,600	1,204,594,308
Hi, Mom	2021-02-12	291,393,700	302,438,900	455,688,900	1,049,521,500
My People, My Country	2019-09-30	290,415,700	387,935,500	365,418,800	1,043,770,000
Detective Chinatown 2	2018-02-16	341,019,800	326,251,000	323,436,900	990,707,700
Crazy Alien	2019-02-05	410,262,700	287,190,200	240,211,400	937,664,300
Hello Mr. Billionaire	2018-07-27	227,136,100	320,695,300	355,662,900	903,494,300
Jiang Ziya	2020-10-01	362,000,000	303,364,400	219,828,700	885,193,100
Transformers: The Last Knight	2017-06-23	332,261,900	316,862,300	223,110,800	872,235,000
Dying to Survive	2018-07-05	225,424,700	241,323,000	385,696,700	852,444,400
My People, My Homeland	2020-10-01	275,119,600	273,619,500	275,068,500	823,807,600
Warcraft	2016-06-08	302,137,500	300,082,600	217,292,500	819,512,600
The Battle at Lake Changjin	2021-09-30	205,191,300	410,802,700	205,191,300	821,185,300
The Wandering Earth	2019-02-05	204,350,300	260,872,600	342,413,200	807,636,100
The Mermaid	2016-02-08	276,897,500	243,742,300	250,082,500	770,722,300
Wolf Warrior 2	2017-07-27	102,056,200	214,715,300	312,670,500	629,442,000

== See also ==
- List of highest-grossing films in Hong Kong
- List of highest-grossing films in Japan
- List of highest-grossing films in South Korea
