= Manhunt (1976 film) =

1976 Japanese film directed by Junya Sato

- Theatrical release poster
- Directed by: Junya Sato
- Screenplay by: Kei Tasaka; Junya Sato
- Based on: Kimi yo Funnu no Kawa o Watare by Juko Nishimura
- Produced by: Masaichi Nagata; Yasuyoshi Tokuma
- Starring: Ken Takakura; Ryoko Nakano; Yoshio Harada
- Cinematography: Setsuo Kobayashi
- Edited by: Michio Suwa
- Music by: Hachiro Aoyama
- Production companies: Nagata Productions; Daiei Film
- Distributed by: Shochiku
- Release date: 11 February 1976
- Running time: 151 minutes
- Country: Japan
- Language: Japanese
- Budget: ¥500 million
- Box office: ¥240 million rentals (Japan) est. 800 million tickets (China); 33.7 million tickets (USSR)

Manhunt, known in Japan as Kimi yo Fundo no Kawa o Watare (Japanese: 君よ憤怒(ふんど)の河を渉れ; lit. 'You Must Cross the River of Wrath'), is a 1976 Japanese crime thriller film directed and co-written by Junya Sato. It is based on the novel Kimi yo Funnu no Kawa o Watare by Juko Nishimura, and stars Ken Takakura as Fuyuto Morioka, a prosecutor who goes on the run from the police after being mysteriously framed for crimes he did not commit.

Manhunt was released in Japan on February 11, 1976, to unfavorable reviews from Japanese critics and was a box-office bomb there—only earning ¥240 million in distributor rentals against a reported ¥500 million budget. It later became the first foreign film released in mainland China following the Cultural Revolution, selling an estimated 800 million tickets there. The film was also a commercial success in the Soviet Union, where it sold 33.7 million tickets. Thus, it is the highest-grossing Japanese film of all time based on box office ticket sales.

The film was a major influence for filmmakers in China, including Zhang Yimou and John Woo. A Chinese remake, directed by Woo, was released in 2017.

== Plot ==
Fuyuto Morioka, a prosecutor in Tokyo, is accused of theft by a woman and again by a man. The stolen items are found at his house, much to his bewilderment, and he flees out the bathroom window. Morioka's superior, General Prosecutor Mamoru Ito, revokes his position as a prosecutor and orders a manhunt on him, assigning Chief Inspector Yamura of the Tokyo Metropolitan Police Department to the case.

Morioka tracks one of his accusers to Makami Village on the Noto Peninsula in Ishikawa Prefecture, but finds her dead. He learns her real name was Kayo Yokomichi and finds a wedding photo of her and the other accuser among her belongings. After Morioka has left, the police find the body, tracking her husband, Keiji Yokomichi, back to a town in Samani District, Hokkaido, where they set up an ambush. Morioka soon arrives but manages to escape the police chase.

While moving through the woods, Morioka notices and disarms a tripwire hooked to a shotgun, then uses it to scare off a bear attacking a woman who is stuck up a tree. The bear chases Morioka off a cliff and into a river. The woman, Mayumi, rescues him and nurses him back to health at her family home. Although he uses an alias, Mayumi's father Yoshinori Tonami, who is running for governor, recognizes Morioka as a wanted fugitive and offers to help. However, Tonami's assistant Nakayama calls the police in an attempt to help his employer's political ambitions and Morioka flees the house. Mayumi follows him on horseback and helps him escape, later confessing what she has done to Yamura when the police arrive. Yamura then follows Mayumi to a seaside shanty where Morioka is hiding and forces them back toward her house at gunpoint. While walking, they are attacked by a bear and Yamura is injured. Morioka helps Yamura back to the hideout and cauterizes his wound with a burning branch. Although Yamura asserts that he will still arrest Morioka despite this, Morioka easily overpowers the weakened officer and escapes with Mayumi to a cave hideout, where they have sex. Mayumi's father later follows her there and offers his private plane to Morioka so that he can hurry to Tokyo to find Yokomichi. Tonami then withdraws from the race for governor and sends Mayumi to Tokyo under the guise of concluding a business deal for him.

Morioka crash lands in the ocean near Mito, Ibaraki, sneaks past police roadblocks in the back of a truck, and makes his way through the woods to Tokyo. He falls ill and is helped by a woman named Kyoko, who recognizes him from the wanted posters. The next night, Morioka is spotted by police in Tokyo and chased through the crowded streets before being rescued by Mayumi on horseback, who is leading a pack of horses that crashes through a shield wall set up by the police. The next day Yamura arrives at Mayumi's hotel and shows Morioka a copy of Yokomichi's medical record from a mental hospital where he is being treated for paranoid schizophrenia under the name Takeshi Suzuki. He states that the hospital is operated by a company, owned by Representative Nagaoka. Nagaoka was speaking with Asakura before Asakura suddenly jumped out a window in an alleged suicide, an explanation that Morioka always doubted. The day before Asakura died, a large amount of money was extorted from him by Tonan Pharmaceuticals, a company that purchased guinea pigs from Yokomichi.

Morioka and Mayumi escape from the hotel before police can arrive. Yamura's superior reprimands him and reminds him of the five-year prison sentence that is mandatory for making deals with suspects. Morioka and Mayumi drive to the mental hospital, where they pretend that Morioka is her husband and have him committed under an alias. However, the head doctor, Doto, recognizes Morioka and taunts him by showing him Yokomichi, who has been rendered incoherent by a strong sedative. Doto force-feeds the same sedative to Morioka and imprisons him in the mental hospital as a schizophrenic under the assumed name and refuses to release him to Mayumi. Morioka intentionally spills some of the pills given to him so that he can pocket them, and later slips one into Mayumi's hand when she visits and she takes it to Yamura.

Nagaoka visits the hospital and is given a demonstration of the effects of the sedative known as "AX", which blocks parts of the brain responsible for will and makes those who take it obedient to commands. The doctor demonstrates this by commanding a patient to stab himself in the arm, which he does. The patient formerly headed the protests against Nagaoka's company, but the new drug will be used as a means to get rid of people like him. Morioka, who has been vomiting up the pills after swallowing them, is instructed to write a suicide note then taken to a roof and instructed to jump. Morioka walks to the edge of the roof, but instead of jumping, he explains that he now understands that Asakura was convinced to jump after being given drugs by Nagaoka. The orderlies attempt to throw Morioka off the roof, as Yamura and Hosoi arrive. Surrounded, Doto commits suicide by jumping off the roof himself and Tonan Pharmaceuticals Executive Director, Sakai, is later found dead of a possible suicide as well.

Morioka, Yamura and Hosoi catch Nagaoka preparing to fly to South Korea with a briefcase full of money and Morioka explains that they know Asakura was blackmailing Nagaoka about the drug "AX". Morioka proposes that Nagaoka knew that he did not believe it was a suicide and therefore sent the Yokomichis to stop him. Morioka also recognizes Nagaoka's assistants as the men who killed Kayo and later shot at him in Hokkaido. Hosoi arrests Nagaoka's men and Nagaoka attempts to leave for his flight, but Yamura pulls out his gun and commands Nagaoka to jump out the window. Nagaoka fights back, so Morioka and Yamura both shoot him and call it self-defense.

General Prosecutor Ito accepts this explanation, but notes Morioka will still have to appear in court. Morioka states that he now believes that some criminals cannot be defeated by the law alone, and that he no longer wishes to be a prosecutor. Yamura tells him that when the time comes to arrest Morioka, he will be there and will like to see if Morioka can escape again. Morioka then meets up with Mayumi, who asks him if everything has been settled. When he tells her it will never be over, she asks to accompany him and the two walk off together.

== Cast ==
- Ken Takakura as Fuyuto Morioka
- Ryoko Nakano as Mayumi Tonami
- Yoshio Harada as Chief Inspector Yamura
- Shinya Owada as Inspector Hosoi
- Ryō Ikebe as Mamoru Ito
- Kunie Tanaka as Keiji Yokomichi
- Kō Nishimura as Nagaoka
- Hideji Ōtaki as Yoshinori Tonami
- Hiroko Isayama as Kayo Yokomichi
- Tappei Shimokawa as Inspector Ogawa
- Taketoshi Naito as Yoshihiro Sakai
- Eiji Okada as Dr. Doto
- Mitsuko Baisho as Kyoko (special guest appearance)

== Production ==
Manhunt marked producer Masaichi Nagata's return to film production following the bankruptcy of Daiei Film, of which he was the former president. Film critic Masaaki Nomura stated that Kokai Tokuma, then-president of the newly revived Daiei, was the one who funded the film. Manhunt also marks both director Junya Sato and lead actor Ken Takakura's first film as free agents, as they had both left Toei shortly after working together on 1975's The Bullet Train. According to Nomura, Satsuo Yamamoto was originally set to direct the film, before Sato took over. Nomura speculated Sato was offered the job because The Bullet Train had been well-received, although not a commercial hit. Although based on Juko Nishimura's 1974 book Kimi yo Funnu no Kawa o Watare, many changes were made to the story.

Nomura said that Toei and Toho had turned down Manhunt, and production could only begin once Shochiku agreed to distribute it. Nomura's colleague Tatsuya Masuto said the film was originally planned for a January 1976 release, but this was changed to February in order to avoid competing with other studios' releases. Production was also delayed as Takakura had injured himself on the set of his previous film, Kobe Kokusai Gang. Filming started in Tokyo, before moving north to Hokkaido. The staff spent a month negotiating with police in order to get permission to shoot the scene where horses gallop through Shinjuku.

== Box office ==
In Japan, the film earned ¥240 million in distributor rental income. ¥240 million rentals was equivalent to an estimated 720,000 ticket sales in 1976. The film was initially not well-received in Japan, where it was criticized by film critics for perceived flaws in its plot and characters. The film barely managed to break even at the Japanese box office.

In mainland China, the film was released under the title Zhuībǔ (追捕; lit. 'Manhunt' or 'Pursuit'). James Marsh notes that the version of the film shown in China was a heavily edited one, dubbed into Mandarin and cut down to around 90 minutes. Records suggest the Chinese version runtime was 112 minutes, with a total of 39 minutes and 15 seconds removed from the original film. This version was dubbed by the Shanghai Film Dubbing Studio, with Bi Ke dubbing Takakura's character. To mark the entry into force of the Treaty of Peace and Friendship between Japan and China, it premiered as part of the first Japanese Film Week, which opened in late October 1978 across several major cities, including Beijing. Two other Japanese films were screened alongside it: Sandakan No. 8 (1974; 望乡) and The Glacier Fox (1978).

Manhunt was the first foreign film to be released in mainland China after the Cultural Revolution ended in 1976. It sold 27 million tickets in Beijing alone during 1978. The film's total ticket sales were in the hundreds of millions at the Chinese box office, with ticket sales estimates as high as 800 million. At least 400 million people saw the film, many of them more than once; some waited in line for three days to buy tickets, and a few were even said to have watched it 54 times. A 1999 survey by Japan's NHK Broadcasting Culture Research Institute found that 80.2% of respondents in China had seen the film.

The film was also a commercial success in the Soviet Union, where it was released in 1977 and sold 33.7 million tickets. It was the highest-grossing Japanese film in the Soviet Union up until Legend of Dinosaurs & Monster Birds (1977) was released there in 1979.

Adjusted for inflation, it is China's highest-grossing foreign film of all time. Its inflation-adjusted gross revenue in China was estimated to be at least CN¥10 billion ($1.48 billion) in 2017 or about $1.94 billion as of 2026. It is thus the highest-grossing Japanese film of all time adjusted for inflation and in terms of box office admissions.

== Legacy ==
As the first foreign film to release in China after the Cultural Revolution ended, it became hugely popular in China at the time and Ken Takakura became very well known. The film had an impact on modern Chinese culture, introducing many Chinese to the outside world, including Japanese popular culture, technology, infrastructure and street fashion. When Ken Takakura died of lymphoma in November 2014, a huge number of Chinese Internet users expressed their sympathies and condolences, including many celebrities in the Chinese movie industry. The spokesman of China's Ministry of Foreign Affairs, Hong Lei, said that Takakura made significant contributions to the cultural exchange between China and Japan.

The film was a major influence for filmmakers in China. Zhang Yimou, Zhang Hanyu, and John Woo have cited the film as a major inspiration that motivated them to pursue careers in the film industry.

Toy Robot released a 4K restoration of Manhunt on Blu-ray in North America on 20 October 2026.

=== Remake ===
Hong Kong action film director John Woo announced at the 2015 Cannes Film Festival that he was directing a remake of Kimi yo Fundo no Kawa o Watare. In March 2016, it was confirmed that Zhang Hanyu, Masaharu Fukuyama, and Qi Wei would be starring in the film. Ha Ji-won was additionally confirmed as being attached to the project. Lee Byung-hun was slated to join, but had to drop out due to scheduling conflicts. Taking place and shot in Japan, the film has Chinese, Japanese, and English dialogue.
