= Sandakan No. 8 =

1974 film

- A Chinese poster of the film
- Directed by: Kei Kumai
- Written by: Kei Kumai; Sakae Hirozawa; Tomoko Yamazaki (story)
- Produced by: Masayuki Sato; Hideyuki Shiino
- Starring: Yoko Takahashi; Kinuyo Tanaka; Komaki Kurihara
- Cinematography: Mitsuji Kaneo
- Edited by: Tatsuji Nakashizu
- Music by: Akira Ifukube
- Production companies: Toho; Haiyūza Eiga
- Release date: November 2, 1974 (Japan)
- Running time: 121 minutes
- Country: Japan
- Language: Japanese
- Box office: 100 million+ tickets (China)

Sandakan No. 8 (Japanese: サンダカン八番娼館 望郷, Hepburn: Sandakan hachiban shōkan: Bōkyō), also known as Sandakan 8 and Brothel 8, is a 1974 Japanese drama film directed by Kei Kumai, starring Yoko Takahashi, Komaki Kurihara and Kinuyo Tanaka. It was nominated for the 48th Academy Awards in the category of Academy Award for Best Foreign Language Film. It also became one of the highest-grossing Japanese films at the Chinese box office, where it generated box office admissions in the hundreds of millions.

== Plot ==
A young female journalist, Keiko Mitani (Komaki Kurihara), is researching an article on the history of Japanese women who were sex slaves in Asian brothels during the early 20th century. She locates Osaki (Kinuyo Tanaka), an elderly woman who lives with a number of cats in a shack in a remote village. Osaki agrees to tell her life story, and the film goes into flashback to the early 1920s. A young Osaki (Yoko Takashi) is sold by her poverty-stricken family into indentured servitude as a maid in Sandakan, British North Borneo (today’s Sabah, Malaysia), at what she believes to be a hotel. At parting, Osaki's distraught and tragic mother gives her a kimono that she has woven by hand the night before her daughter's departure. The kimono will be Osaki's most treasured possession forever. The establishment is actually a brothel called Sandakan No. 8. Osaki, who is sold as a young girl, works for two years as a maid but is forced by the brothel’s owners to become a prostitute. Osaki stays at Sandakan 8 until World War II, and in that period, she never experiences genuine affection outside of a brief romance with a poor farmer who abandons her when he comes one evening to the brothel and sees the disheveled and exhausted Osaki after an onslaught of service to a battalion of Japanese sailors recently docked at the town. When Osaki returns to Japan, her brother and his wife, who have bought a house with the money she sent them, tell her that she has become an embarrassment.

Osaki leaves for Manchuria, where she marries a Japanese man, who then dies. On returning to Japan, because of her experiences at Sandakan No. 8, she is shunned and treated like a pariah, even by her son who lives a respectable life in a large city.

== Cast ==
- Komaki Kurihara – Keiko Mitani
- Yoko Takahashi – Osaki as a young woman
- Kinuyo Tanaka – Osaki Yamakawa, as an old woman
- Takiko Mizunoe – Okiku
- Eiko Mizuhara – Ofumi
- Yoko Todo – Oyae
- Yukiko Yanagawa – Otake
- Yoko Nakagawa – Ohana
- Masayo Umezawa – Yukiyo
- Ken Tanaka – Hideo Takeuchi
- Eitaro Ozawa – Tarozo
- Tomoko Jinbo – Moto
- Hideo Sunazuka – Yajima
- Mitsuo Hamada – Yasukichi
- Kaneko Iwasaki – Sato
- Siti Sundari Samad aka Siti Tanjung Perak – local people
- Omar Hitam aka Udo Omar – local people

== Production ==
Sandakan No. 8 was based on the 1972 book Sandakan Brothel No. 8: An Episode in the History of Lower-Class by Yamazaki Tomoko. The book focused on the "karayuki-san", the Japanese term for young women who were forced into sexual slavery (see sex trafficking) in Pacific Rim countries and colonies during the early 20th century. The book created controversy in Japan, where the subject of the karayuki-san was not discussed in public or in scholarly examinations of Japanese history. Yamazaki’s book was a best-seller and won the Oya Soichi Prize for Non-Fiction Literature; she quickly followed up with a sequel, The Graves of Sandakan. Filmmaker Kei Kumai combined the two books into the screenplay for Sandakan No. 8.

== Awards and release ==
Sandakan No. 8 won Best Picture, Best Director, and Best Actress for Kinuyo Tanaka in the 1975 Kinema Jumpo Awards. Tanaka won the Best Actress Award at the 25th Berlin International Film Festival, while Kumai received a Best Director nomination at that festival.

Sandakan No. 8 was nominated for the 1975 Academy Award for Best Foreign Language Film, but it lost to another production directed by a Japanese filmmaker: Akira Kurosawa's Dersu Uzala, which was the Soviet Union entry for the Oscar competition.

The film was not released in the U.S. until late 1976. Roger Ebert, in a review published in the Chicago Sun-Times, noted the film’s "material is sensitively handled...the movie is not explicit." But Janet Maslin, in a review for The New York Times, called it a "film about prostitution, narrated from what is supposed to be a feminist point of view. However feminism, in this case, only means interjecting a particularly noxious form of man-hating where the pornographic touches ordinarily might be." To date, Sandakan No. 8 has not been commercially released in the U.S. on DVD.

== Reception ==
The Japanese filmmaker Akira Kurosawa cited Sandakan No. 8 as one of his 100 favorite films.

== Box office ==
The film was an overseas blockbuster in China, where it released as 望乡 (Wàng Xiāng) in 1978. It was among the first foreign films released there after the Cultural Revolution ended. It was one of the highest-grossing Japanese films at the Chinese box office at the time, along with Kimi yo Fundo no Kawa o Watare (Manhunt). Chinese audiences related to the topic of comfort women (which occurred during the Japanese occupation of China) and it was among the earliest depictions of sexuality seen in Chinese cinemas. In Beijing alone, Sandakan grossed more than CN¥3.5 million ($2.08 million) at the box office. The film generated total Chinese box office admissions in the hundreds of millions.

== See also ==
- Comfort women
- Japanese migration to Malaysia
- Sandakan Japanese Cemetery
- Japanese occupation of British Borneo
- List of submissions to the 48th Academy Awards for Best Foreign Language Film
- List of Japanese submissions for the Academy Award for Best Foreign Language Film
