= The Xi'an Incident (film) =

- Film poster
- Directed by: Cheng Yin
- Written by: Cheng Yin; Zhong Zheng
- Starring: Jin Ange; Wang Tiecheng; Sun Feihu
- Cinematography: Zheng Yuyuan; Chen Wangcai; Gao Hongtao
- Production company: Xi'an Film Studio
- Release date: 17 November 1981
- Running time: 170 minutes
- Country: China
- Language: Mandarin
- Box office: 450 million tickets

The Xi'an Incident (simplified Chinese: 西安事变; traditional Chinese: 西安事變; pinyin: Xī'ān Shìbiàn) is a 1981 Chinese historical drama film directed by Cheng Yin (成荫), starring Jin Ange, Wang Tiecheng and Sun Feihu. It was produced by the Xi'an Film Studio (西安电影制片厂) and seeks to be a historically accurate representation of the 1936 Xi'an Incident.

The film was critically acclaimed and won three awards at the 2nd Golden Rooster Awards: Best Director, Best Supporting Actor (Sun Feihu for his portrayal of Chiang Kai-shek) and Best Make-up.

== Plot ==
Marshal Zhang Xueliang, Commander of the North Eastern Army, grows progressively disillusioned by Kuomintang leader Chiang Kai-shek's policy to engage the Chinese Communist Party (CCP) rather than fight the Japanese invaders which are occupying Manchuria. Despite numerous pleas, Chiang does not budge. After discussing with fellow general Yang Hucheng, the two take events into their own hands and place Chiang Kai-shek under arrest on December 12, 1936, forcing Chiang into a coalition with the CCP.

== Cast ==
- Jin Ange - Zhang Xueliang
- Wang Tiecheng - Zhou Enlai
- Sun Feihu - Chiang Kai-shek
- Xin Jing - Yang Hucheng
- Gu Yue - Mao Zedong

== Box office ==
In terms of box office admissions, it was among the highest-grossing films in China, with 450 million tickets sold by 1985.
