= Sandakan Japanese Cemetery =

Cemetery in Sabah, Malaysia

- サンダカン日本墓地; Tanah Perkuburan Jepun Sandakan
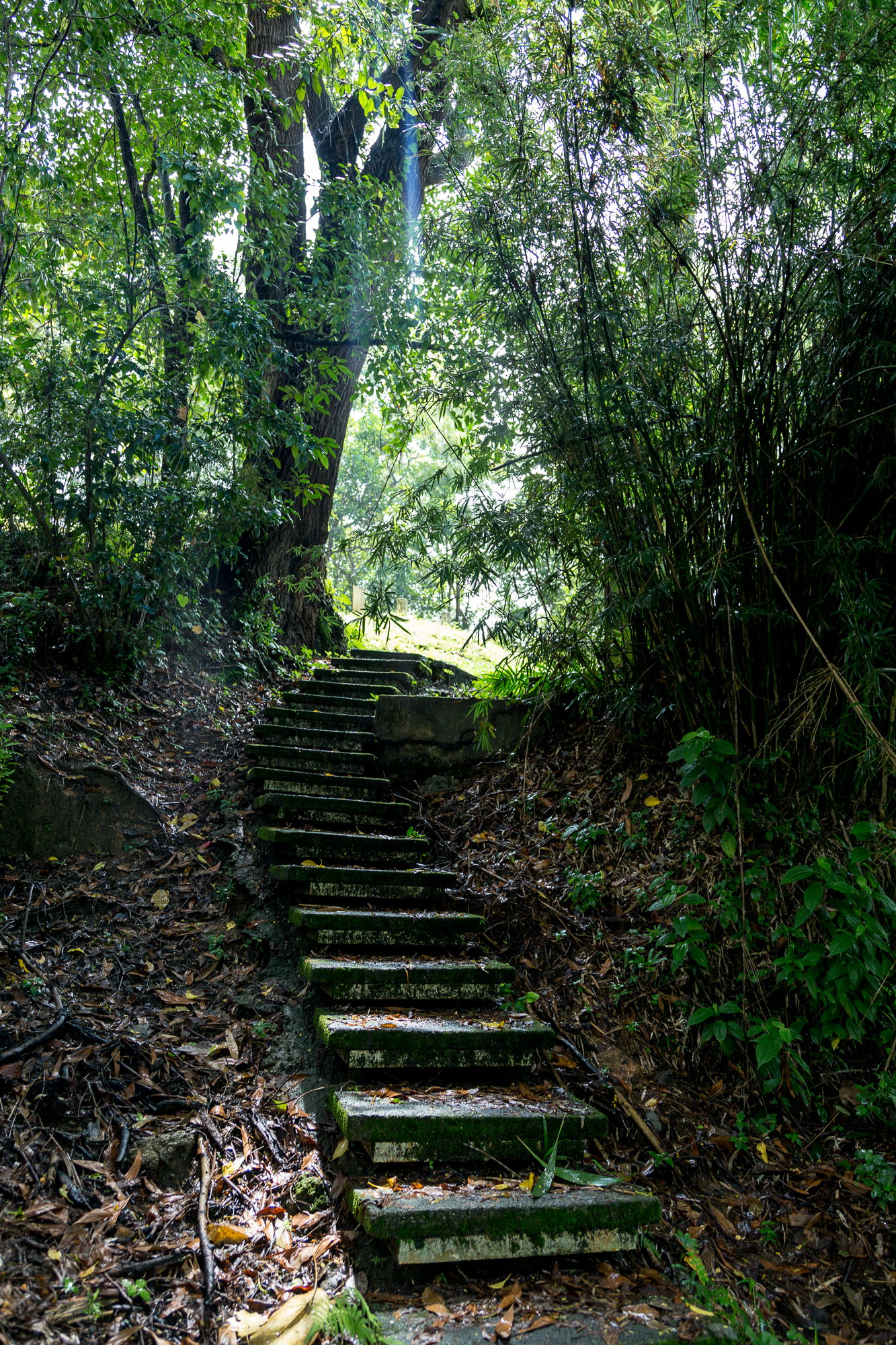
- Stairs leading to the cemetery.
- Interactive map of Sandakan Japanese Cemetery

Details
- Established: 1890
- Location: Sandakan, Sabah
- Country: Malaysia
- Coordinates: 5°50′39″N 118°07′29″E
- Type: Cemetery

Sandakan Japanese Cemetery (Japanese: サンダカン日本墓地; Malay: Tanah Perkuburan Jepun Sandakan) is an old graveyard in Sandakan, Sabah, Malaysia. Located on a hill about 2 kilometres from the town's central business district, it is a cemetery where the remains are buried of many Japanese female prostitutes called Karayuki-san from poverty-stricken agricultural prefectures in Japan who were sold into slavery at a very young age years before World War II which also include recent comfort women during the war. It is part of the Sandakan Heritage Trail.

== History ==
The cemetery was founded in 1890 by Madam Kinoshita Kuni (born 7 July 1854) from Futae Village, Amakusa County, Kumamoto Prefecture, a successful Japanese female manager of Sandakan's lucrative 'Brothel No. 8 (サンダカン八番娼館, Sandakan hachiban shōkan)' for Japanese prostitutes who died in the town. Madam Okuni was a very influential woman who was fluent in English. Many Yamato nadeshiko (Japanese girls) sought her guidance and protection as the treatment of the girls in her brothel was much better than in the other Japanese brothels in Sandakan, where she was called the "Okuni" of South Seas. She was raised in a poor family before becoming the mistress of an Englishman in Yokohama at a young age. When her husband returned to England, she moved to Sandakan and opened a general store and a brothel.

In 1891, there were already 20 brothels and 71 Japanese prostitutes in Sandakan. The cemetery built by Okuni is meant for the souls of Japanese who died in Sandakan. She herself had a place reserved in the cemetery, when she was still alive; showing that she intended to live permanently in Sandakan and did not want to return to Japan. All of the grave stones in the cemetery were directly ordered from her homeland. The cemetery subsequently become famous among Japanese visitors, including those from Jesselton and Tawau as they would stop at the cemetery to pray for the deceased before continuing on their journeys. A book published in 1972 by Japanese writer Tomoko Yamazaki mentioned that the cemetery used to have hundreds Japanese graves. The cemetery also has a monument erected in 1989 for fallen Japanese soldiers from World War II as an addition.

== Features ==
The majority of the graves in the cemetery belong to Karayuki-san, mainly daughters of poor Japanese people with low social status or value. These females were sent overseas to work as maids, and then forced into prostitution activities. The bodies of those who are buried in the cemetery have their feet pointing towards the direction of Japan, possibly as a posture or gesture that condemns their ancestral home for abandoning them, while exhorting them to support Japan's war efforts. If so, this can be considered an ultimate insult.

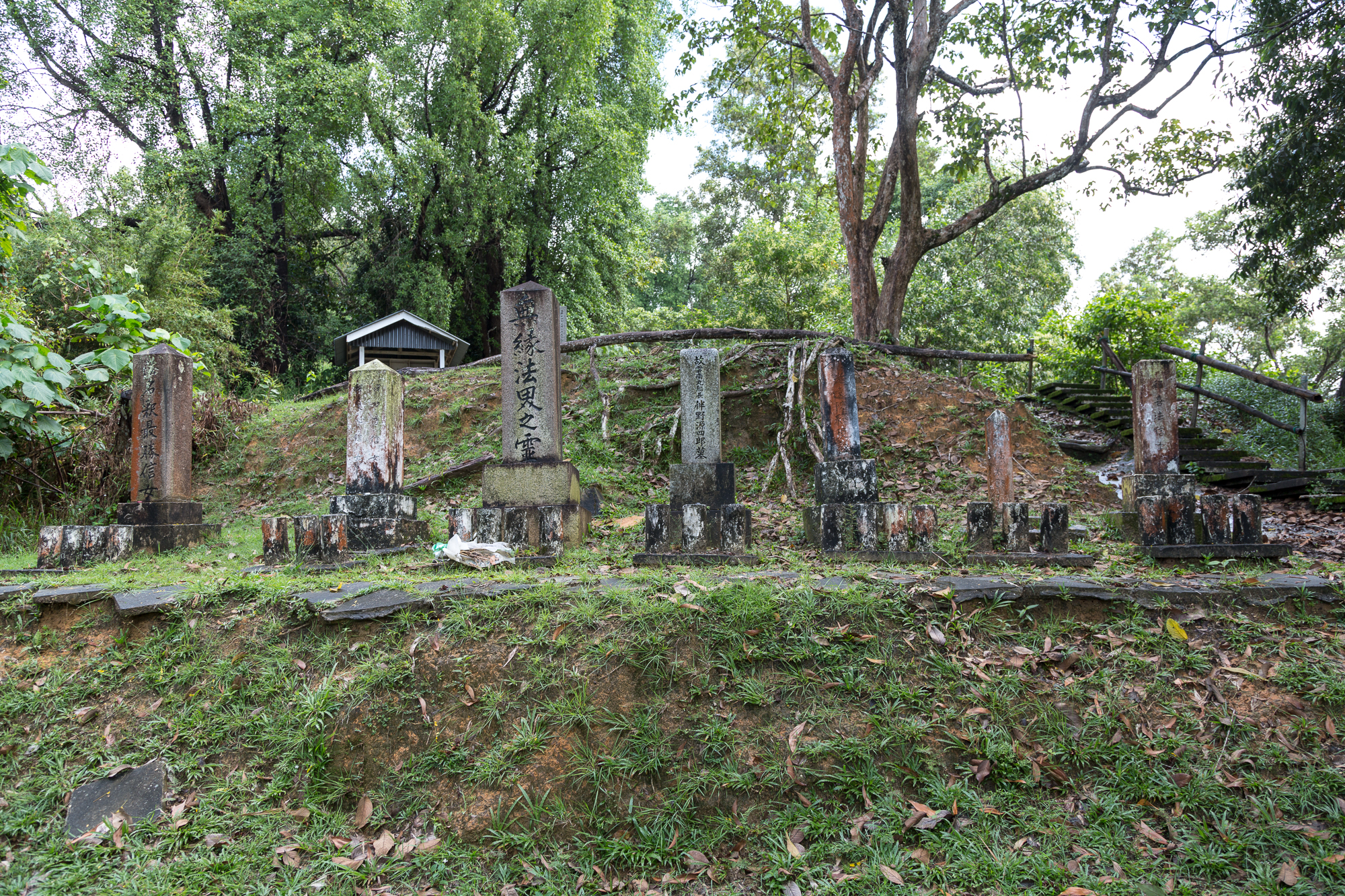
Headstone in the cemetery.

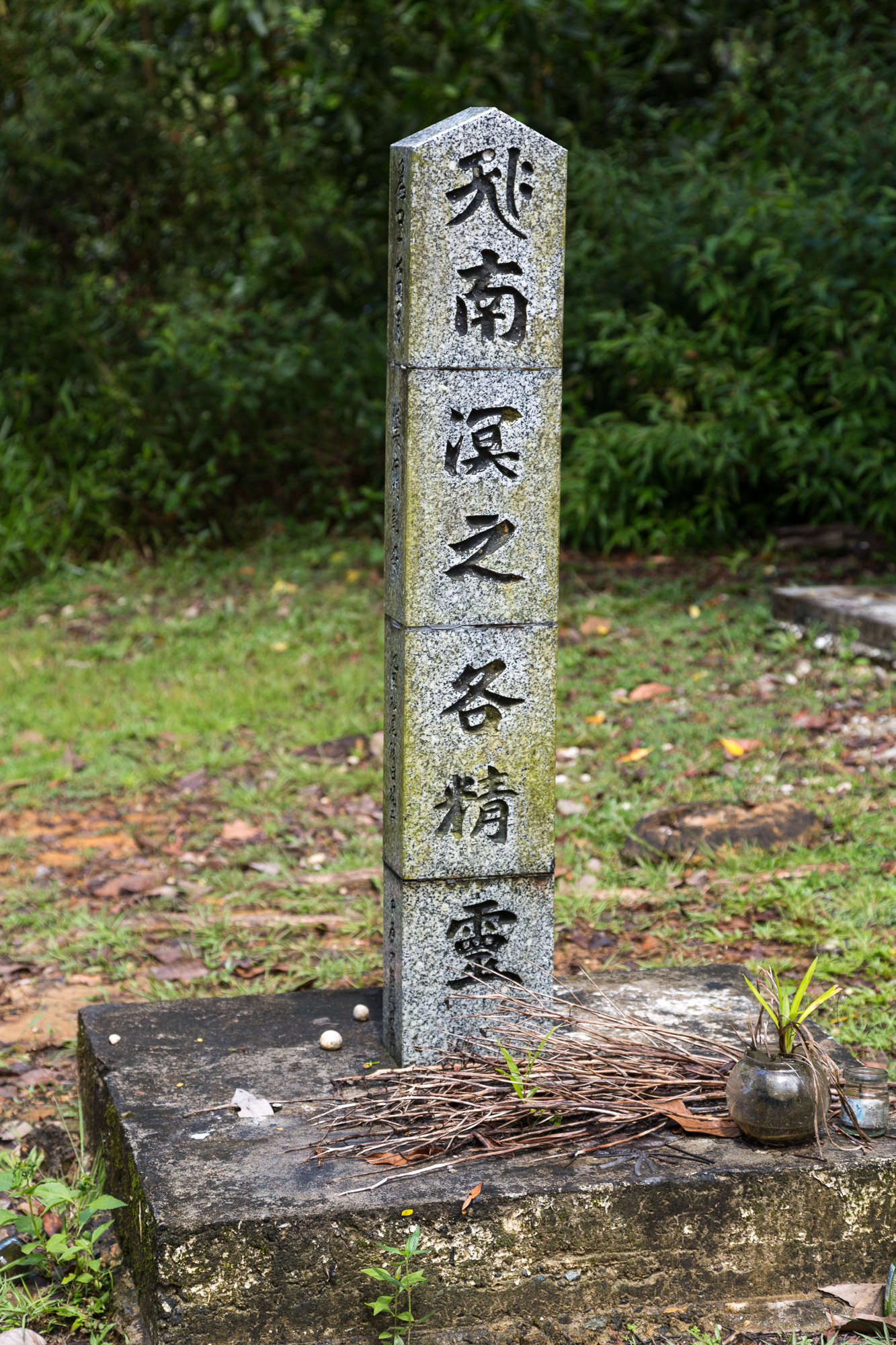
A headstone with Japanese characters.

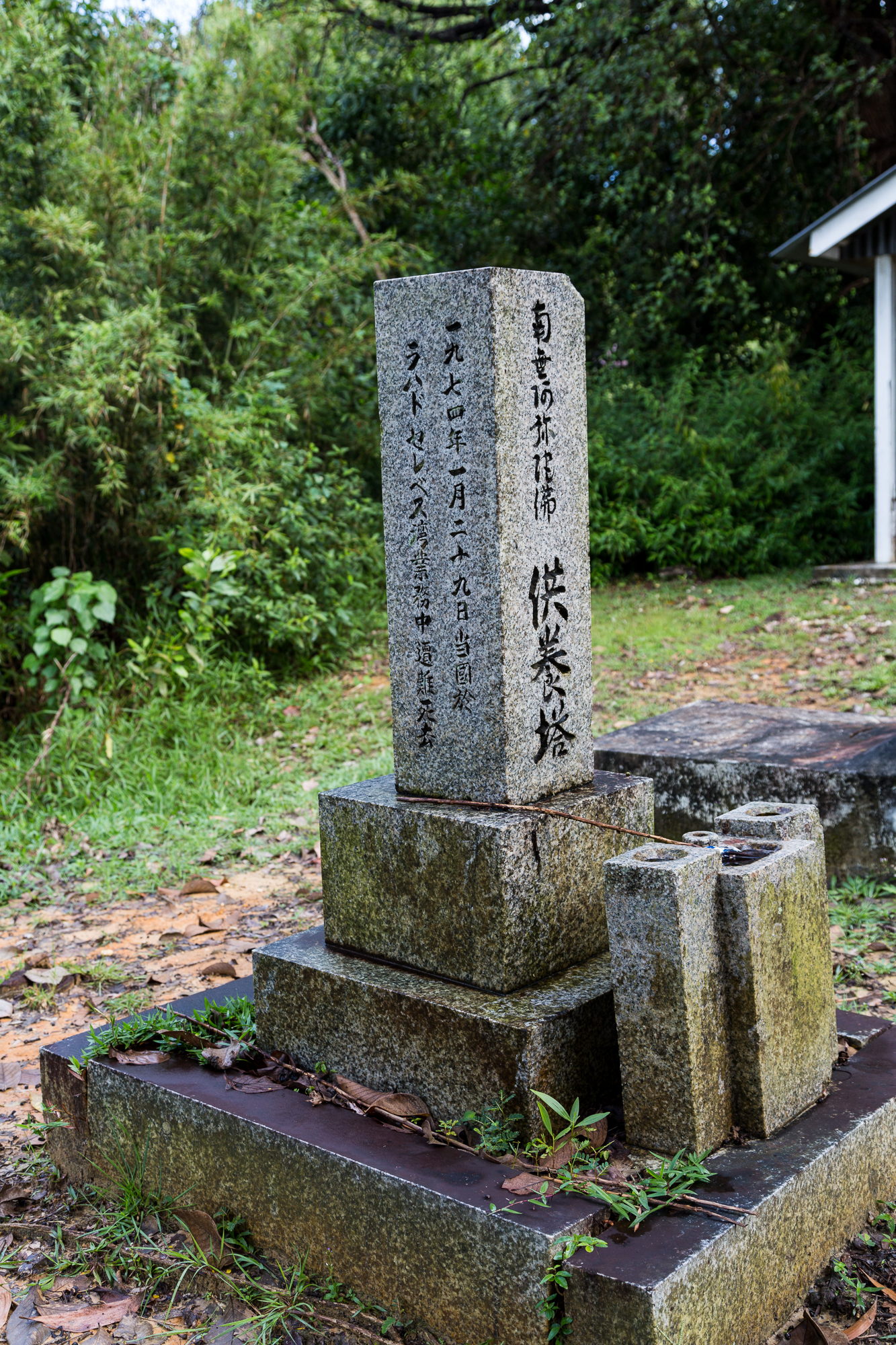
Another headstone.

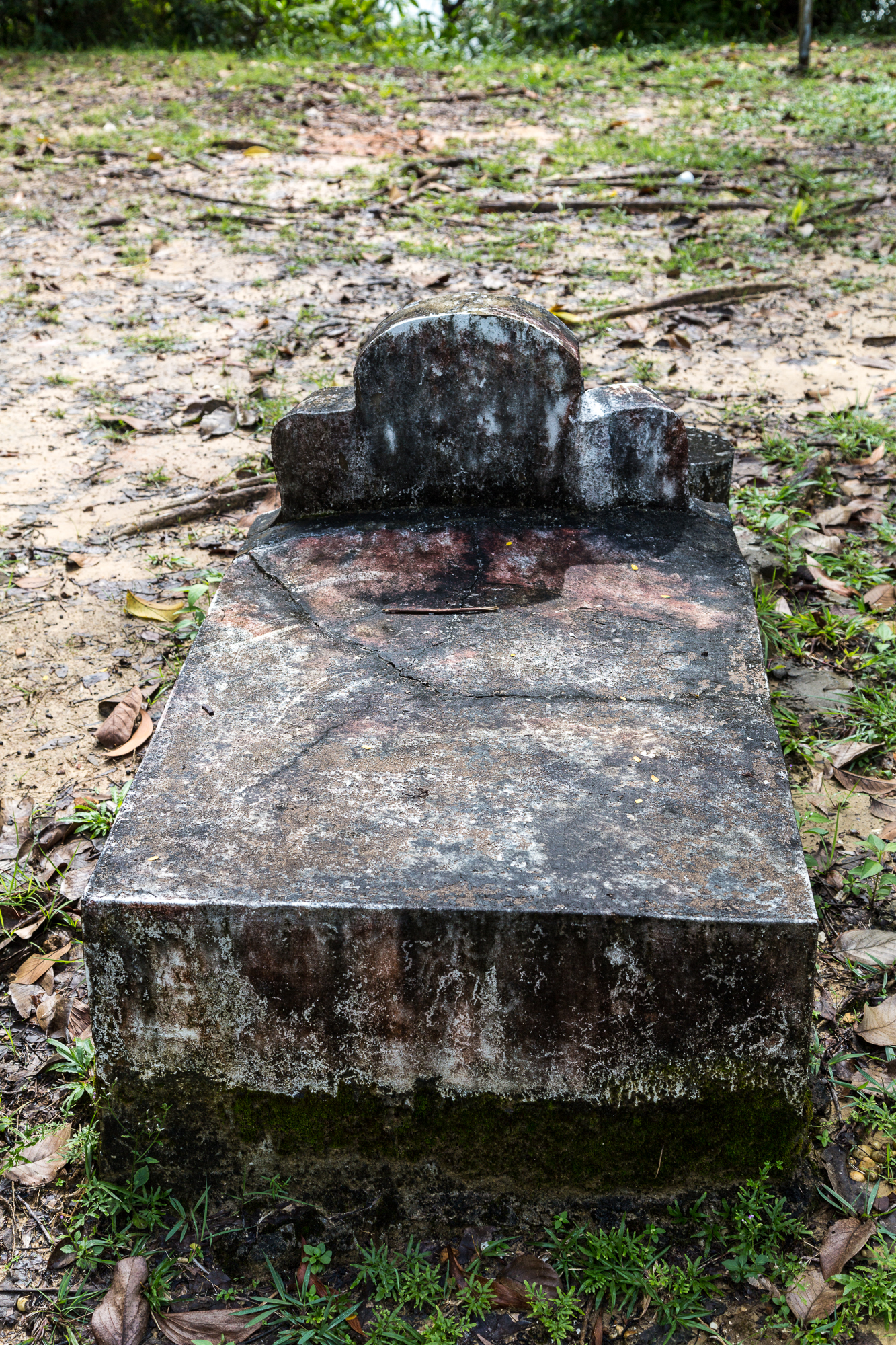
A grave.

== See also ==
- Sandakan No. 8
