= Tunnel War =

1965 Chinese film

- Traditional Chinese: 地道戰
- Simplified Chinese: 地道战
- Hanyu Pinyin: Dì dào zhàn
- Directed by: Ren Xudong
- Written by: Ren Xudong; Pan Yunshan
- Starring: Longguang Zhu; Bingyu Wang; Xiujie Liu; Yongshou Zhang; Xiaozhong Wang; Jiang Liu
- Cinematography: Yang Guangyuan
- Release date: 1965
- Running time: 96 minutes
- Country: China
- Language: Mandarin
- Box office: 300 million+ tickets

Tunnel War (Chinese: 地道战; pinyin: Dì dào zhàn), also known as Tunnel Warfare, is a 1965 Chinese film produced before the Cultural Revolution about a small town which defends itself from the Japanese intrusion by use of a network of tunnels during the Second Sino-Japanese War. The film was directed by Ren Xudong and produced by the August First Film Studio.

== Plot ==
Set during the Second Sino-Japanese War, the film tells a story of a group of villages who, after coming under attack by Japanese forces, read Mao Zedong's text On Protracted War and dig an extensive tunnel network under their village. They successfully repel the invaders. The film deals with themes of mass mobilization.

=== Prologue ===
The movie begins with the ringing of a large bell, in Gaojia village, causing the villagers to all gather in the village square. They await the return of Chuanbao, the village militia sergeant, and the village elder. The twosome arrive with Chuanbao carrying the village elder on his back. The village elder explains that they were attacked by Japanese forces in the middle of a meeting and has been seriously wounded as a result. With a few parting words instructing his successor, Laozhong, to "keep holding on" and handling him Mao Zedong's On Protracted War book, he dies.

=== First confrontation ===
The movie then cuts to a fighting scene between large numbers of Japanese and Chinese forces. Against superior firepower, the main Chinese army retreats while leaving local resistance militias in place to harass the enemy. Local villagers hide in tunnels below the surface of the village in order to escape the Japanese attackers. The Japanese seem to have some familiarity with this tactic as they search for and attempt to kill the occupants of these tunnels. The attack concludes with capture of a number of villagers and a flaming village being burnt as a result of raiding by the Japanese.

Some time afterward, Chuanbao and a few militia are shown discussing their next course of action against the Japanese. One of the soldiers complain about having "too few people and too few weapons" but Brother Gao manages to restore the confidence of his men by rallying them for an attack. However, he is stopped by a middle aged woman, Xia Lin, who seems to hold authority over him. She tells them to meet back in the village for a village meeting.

After reading aloud On Protracted War, a military strategy text by Mao Zedong, the villagers decide to begin digging extensive tunnels beneath the village in preparation for more fighting against the Japanese.

Meanwhile, the Japanese hear of these resistance plans and plan a night raid on the village. The Japanese are almost able to sneak in completely undetected, but were accidentally discovered by Laozhong while he was outside for a stroll. Laozhong is able to ring the village bell, sounding the alarm, allowing the rest of the villagers to enter into the safety of the tunnels. The Japanese raiders surround Laozhong and the Japanese Company Commander Yamada shoots Laozhong. Before he dies, Laozhong is able to use a grenade to kill several Japanese soldiers.

The Japanese are initially unable to find anymore villagers so they begin to look for the tunnels by digging into the ground. Upon finding the tunnels, they pour water, spew smoke and potentially poison gas into the tunnels. After trying to plug up the smoke and gas, Chuanbao realizes that they can't hold out forever. In consultation with Xia Lin, he decides to go to the surface through a secret tunnel in order to draw away the Japanese. He secretly shoots at Yamada's hip, wounding him. Meanwhile, other nearby villages come to give aid by setting off fireworks which mimic the sounds of gunfire in order to intimidate the Japanese. Collaborationist Chinese Army General Binghui suggests that the Japanese retreat and Yamada grudgingly agrees.

=== Second confrontation ===
Some days later, Chuanbao is shown to be surveying the damage done to his village by the Japanese raid. Chuanbao despairs at the destruction but meets Uncle Pingyuan and is comforted by him. After conversing with Uncle Pingyuan, Chuanbao resolves to see the conflict through to the end and is advised by Pingyuan to read more of Mao Zedong's works on military strategy. As Chuanbao reads the literature, he is inspired by a quote "To protect yourself is to better destroy the enemy. To destroy the enemy is to better protect yourself." He brings this concept before the rest of village and receives unanimous support. They decide to try making the tunnels into an offensive option against the Japanese soldiers instead of only using them as hiding places. Over at least one winter season, the tunnels develop defensive sophistication meant to defend against flooding, poison gas and infiltrators. Additionally, there are offensive capabilities devised in order to attack Japanese soldiers on the surface. The tunnel design is taken on by several neighboring villages. Additionally, the villagers are told that communist reinforcements are also returning to the area.

The Japanese hear of this and use the opportunity to send in spies posing as the communist reinforcements in order learn more about the tunnel defenses. The impostor reinforcements plan to gather all the local resistance leaders and then capture them all by surprise. However, before they are able to initiate the plan, Chuanbao realizes their plot. He tricks some of them to split up and enter the tunnels and kills the spies one by one in the enclosed space. During this time, the real Communist forces arrive and apprehend the remaining spies. Japanese troops arrive to facilitate the capture, but are swiftly repelled by the Communist's reinforcement regiment. With all the major elements of the Chinese forces present, the Chinese forces prepare for an imminent counterattack by the Japanese. The ensuing engagement between 300 Japanese forces and local militia result in a total victory for the Chinese. Initially, the Chinese militia are overwhelmed by Japanese artillery, but the Japanese infantry take heavy casualties when trying to finally take the village and are forced to retreat.

=== Final confrontation ===
In the aftermath of the previous victory, the militia continue expanding the tunnel network. They begin to expand outside the village and eventually reach the vicinity of the Japanese villages; all the resistance villages are also interconnected. Chuanbao makes a joke about "undermining" the entire Japanese base. Meanwhile, the Japanese forces have fortified and reinforced their base positions making direct assault by the Chinese forces extremely difficult. The Chinese try to draw out the dug in Japanese with a diversionary attack on a lesser defended base. However, General Yamada of the Japanese sees through the plot and, hoping they'll score an easy victory at the village, directly attack the militia village,

The communist command realizes the Japanese plan, but is confident that the forces stationed in the village are sufficient for defense. They instead use the absence of the Japanese main force as an opportunity to assault the previously fortified Japanese base. In preparation for the inevitable Japanese retreat, the Chinese prepared troops to ambush the Japanese on the way. In the tunnels beneath the Japanese base, the Chinese militia place explosives to take out key defensive positions. With preparations complete, the primary Chinese army commences with the assault. As predicted, the Japanese main force begins to retreat upon hearing of the Chinese assault and are caught directly in the ambush in the open fields. Hundreds of armed Chinese militia are shown to be attacking the surprised Japanese forces. By the end, General Yamada is shown to be trapped in a brick kiln. Surrounded by Chinese forces and all alone, it is implied that the Japanese forces have been completely routed. The movie concludes with a festive celebration by the victorious Chinese.

== Casting ==
- Village Elder Successor; Character Name: Laozhong Gao (高老忠); Played by Bingyu Wang (王炳彧)
- Main Protagonist; Character Name: Chuanbao Gao (高传宝); Played by Longguang Zhu (朱龙广)
- Communist Lieutenant; Character Name: Uncle Pingyuan Zhao (赵平原); Played by Yongshou Zhang (张勇手)
- Main Female Protagonist; Character Name: Xia Lin (林霞); Played by Xiujie Liu (刘秀杰)
- Japanese Company Commander; Character Name: Yamada (山田); Played by Xiaozhong Wang (王孝忠)
- Chinese Collaborative Forces Commander; Character Name: Binghui Tang (汤丙会); Played by Jiang Liu (刘江)

== Reception and release ==
While the film was popular upon its release in 1965, its popularity would not peak until nearly a decade later, when it became of one of the "Three Old Fights" (Chinese: 老三戰; pinyin: Lǎo sān zhàn), a collection of three war films from pre-1966 that nevertheless were given wide circulation during the Cultural Revolution—the other two films were Mine Warfare (1962) and Fighting North and South (1952).

In contrast, some 600 other films made between 1952 and 1966 were banned by the Communist authorities during the social upheaval of the 1970s.

It sold more than 300 million box office admissions in China, making it the highest-grossing film in China up until it was surpassed by In-Laws (Full House of Joy) in the early 1980s.

The film is one of the most watched of all time, with 1.8 billion viewers as of 2006, according to the August First Film Studio.

== See also ==
- Tunnel Warfare (地道战), a 2009 tv series
- Central Hebei tunnel warfare
- Eight route army
