= Love of the White Snake =

1978 Hong Kong film by Chen Chi-hwa

- DVD cover for Love of the White Snake
- Chinese: 真白蛇传
- Directed by: Chen Chi-hwa
- Written by: Ke Szema
- Produced by: Huang Zhuo-han
- Starring: Brigitte Lin; Chin Tse-min; Charlie Chin; Lee Kwan; Miao Tien; Sun Yueh
- Cinematography: Chris Chen Ching-Chu
- Production company: First Films
- Release date: 15 September 1978
- Running time: 96 mins
- Country: Hong Kong
- Language: Mandarin

Love of the White Snake (Traditional Chinese: 真白蛇傳 Chinese: 真白色传) is a 1978 Hong Kong fantasy romance film. Directed by Chen Chi-hwa, the film is an adaptation of the Chinese folklore Legend of the White Snake. The film stars Brigitte Lin as Madame White Snake (Bai Suzhen), Chin Tse-Min as the Green Snake (Xiao Qing), and Charlie Chin as pharmacist Xu Xian.

== Plot ==
A kind-hearted, thousand-year-old snake spirit, Bai Suzhen, leaves Mount Emei to meet a pharmacist called Xu Xian in Hangzhou, in order to repay a debt of gratitude from seven generations ago. She is accompanied by her junior, a 500-year-old snake spirit named Xiao Qing. Despite warnings from her master to complete her training before honouring her debt, she insists on returning the favour to Xu Xian's current reincarnation, as he is experiencing hardship in this life. They meet Xu Xian by the West Lake, and travel by boat together during a rainstorm created by Xiao Qing. To avoid the rain, both sisters invite Xu Xian to their home—an illusion created by Xiao Qing—for the night. During his stay, Xiao Qing manages to convince Xu Xian to accept Suzhen's marriage proposal, and they wed the same night.

Soon, they return to Hangzhou, and with the sister's careful planning, boost Xu Xian's pharmacy business. They attract the attention of a Taoist priest, Fa Hai, who attempts to persuade Xu Xian that his wife and her maidservant are both snake demons. When Xu Xian's attempt to reveal their true nature fails, he is convinced that Fa Hai intends to cheat him of his money, and ignores the priest's warnings. Fa Hai's confrontation with the sisters end in his defeat, thanks to the help of their senior, Brother of Snakes. He seeks the help of a Buddhist monk, who warns Xu Xian that he will experience misfortune during the Dragon Boat Festival. Xu Xian dismisses him.

During the Dragon Boat Festival celebrations, Suzhen consumes Realgar wine to appease Xu Xian, who persist they adhere to the festival's tradition of drinking the yellow wine mixed with powdered realgar to ward off evil. As snakes are allergic to the arsenic sulphide mineral, Suzhen weakens and reverts into a giant white snake, causing Xu Xian to die from shock. Despite being pregnant, Suzhen travels to Kunlun Mountain in hopes of retrieving Lingzhi, a magical herb capable of reviving the dead. She obtains the herb with the blessings of its guardian, the Old Man of the South Pole, and manages to save Xu Xian. Once recovered, Suzhen makes Xu Xian believe that the white snake he saw was a creature of fortune, only seen in homes blessed with prosperity.

His persistence to vanquish the sisters causes Fa Hai to put Xu Xian in a trance, and lead him to Jinshan Temple, where the monk and his disciples lock him in a pagoda in order to lure the sisters to them. Xu Xian tries to convince them that the sisters are not evil, and pleas for them to release him. When the sisters arrive, they fight with the monk, and with the help of Brother of Snakes, flood the temple and surrounding villages, causing countless deaths. The monk kills the Brother of Snakes, and releases Xu Xian to the sisters, vowing that he would return one day to capture them after Suzhen delivers their baby. Months later, during the full moon celebration of their child, Suzhen, without the protection of her child's energy, is captured by the monk, and placed under Leifeng Pagoda. Xiao Qing flees from the scene on Suzhen's instructions to report back to their master. Years later, Xu Xian and his adolescent son visit Suzhen at Leifeng Pagoda.

== Casts and characters ==
- Brigitte Lin as Madame White Snake/Bai Suzhen, a thousand-year-old snake spirit
- Chin Tse-Min as Green Snake/Xiao Qing, a 500-year-old snake spirit and Bai Suzhen's junior
- Charlie Chin as Xu Xian, a pharmacist and Bai Suzhen's love interest
- Lee Kwan as Fa Hai, a Taoist priest
- Miao Tien as Brother of Snakes, Bai Suzhen and Xiao Qing's senior
- Sun Yueh as Buddhist monk
- Chen Shu-fang as the snake spirit's master

== Production ==
Director Li Han-hsiang was initially attached to the film as a favour to producer Huang Zhuo-han, for helping him finance The Dream of the Red Chamber. The Shaw Brothers intervened, and the project was passed on to director Chen Chi-hwa, who completed the script under his pseudonym Ke Szema.

Brigitte Lin filmed The Dream of the Red Chamber, Love of the White Snake, and A Love Seed back-to-back, but because of production delays, she was unable to shoot White Snake until she had finished her scenes for A Love Seed. While waiting for Lin to complete A Love Seed, the film crew shot exterior scenes in South Korea, but production was again delayed when Charlie Chin fell sick and travelled to Europe for a month and a half after recovery. Michelle Yim initially played the role of Xiao Qing and had shot scenes in South Korea, but because of scheduling conflicts, she was replaced by Chin Tze-min, and her scenes were cut.

The film was scheduled for release close to the Dragon Boat Festival in summer. Leading up to its premiere, the Shaw Brothers arranged to re-screen their 1962 film adaptation Madam White Snake starring Lin Dai, and as they've registered the Chinese title 白蛇传, Brigitte Lin's version was forced to change its name to 真白蛇传 to avoid legal issues. The Shaw Brother's version was pulled from theatres after only one week from poor ticket sales, while Love of the White Snake performed well at the box office.

== Reception ==
For her role and acting performance in the film, Chin Tse-Min was nominated for Best Supporting Actress at the 15th Golden Horse Awards.

== Analysis ==
In Liang Luo's analysis of the film in the study Hong Kong Horror Cinema—The White Snake in Hong Kong Horror Cinema: from Horrific Tales to Crowd Pleasers, she notes that throughout the history of Legend of the White Snake film adaptations, unlike its predecessors, Love of the White Snake saw a shift from horror to romance. This is supported by humanising Suzhen's character. Xiao Qing's humanity is also depicted through her transformation of stones and leaves into servants and maids, then naming the servants Baifu (White the Rich) and Baigui (White the Noble), “...further engraving human values onto non-human objects.”.

Xu Xian is also depicted as a likeable character, a contrast from the cowardly and indecisive interpretations in previous film adaptations, thus moving this version further away from horror. The casting of Brigitte Lin as the titular character cements its change to romance, as the actress was well-known in Taiwan for her romance films and TV soap operas prior to the film. Her portrayal is described as "...Lin’s crowd-pleasing screen persona had a lasting impact on bringing the romantic image of the White Snake into mainstream popular culture in the Chinese-speaking world and beyond."

Though, the film still retains horror elements inspired by Sichuan Opera—when Xu Xian recovers from the traumatic Dragon Boat Festival ordeal, he imagines the sister's faces being replaced with frightening masks that resemble a human-snake hybrid. This is thanks to split screen and time-lapse technology, amongst other special effects used in the film. It is also noted that the film was shot on location in South Korea and Taiwan, providing it with realistic outdoors scenery as a first in its adaptations.

The film's shift in genre, use of advanced special effects, and outdoor scenery, marks an attempt to break free from historical portrayals of the folktale, into something new for its time.

== See also ==
- List of media adaptations of the Legend of the White Snake
