= List of films by box office admissions =

The following table lists known estimated box office ticket sales for various high-grossing films that have sold at least 100 million tickets worldwide.

Note that some of the data are incomplete due to a lack of available admissions data from a number of box office territories. Therefore, it is not an exhaustive list of all the highest-grossing films by ticket sales, so no rankings are given.

Also note that high ticket sales among Chinese films during the late 1970s to 1980s were driven by low ticket prices, with a cinema ticket typically costing between ¥0.1 ($0.06) and ¥0.3 ($0.19) in China at the time.

† Background shading indicates films playing in the week commencing 13 November 2026 in theaters around the world.

== List of films by box office admissions ==
Film	Year	Tickets (est.)	Territories included (Note: Box office territories for which the film's ticket sales data are currently known)	Ref
Legend of the White Snake (Bai she zhuan)	1980	700,000,000	China	
In-Laws (Full House of Joy)	1981	650,000,000	China	
Wudang (The Undaunted Wudang)	1983	610,000,000	China	
Gunshots in the CIB (Baomi Ju de Qiangsheng)	1979	600,000,000	China	
Murder in 405 (405 mou sha an)	1980	600,000,000	China	
The Shaolin Brothers	1983	520,000,000	China	
Shaolin Temple	1982	500,994,065	China, Hong Kong, South Korea	(Note: Shaolin Temple: China – 500,000,000; Hong Kong – 700,000; South Korea – 294,065)
Sesame Official (Qi pin zhi ma guan)	1980	500,000,000	China	
Deadly Fury (Pride's Deadly Fury)	1983	500,000,000	China	
From Slave to General	1979	470,000,000	China	
The Xi'an Incident	1981	450,000,000	China	
Manhunt (Kimi yo Fundo no Kawa o Watare)	1976	434,400,000	Japan, China, Soviet Union	(Note: Manhunt (Kimi yo Fundo no Kawa o Watare): Japan – 700,000; China – 400,000,000; Soviet Union – 33,700,000)
Avengers: Endgame †	2019	430,400,000	Worldwide	(Note: Avengers: Endgame: Argentina, Bolivia, Brazil, Chile, Colombia, Croatia, France, Greece, Hungary, India, Japan, Mexico, Netherlands, Paraguay, Peru, Romania, Russia, Serbia, Spain, Sweden, Switzerland, Ukraine, United Arab Emirates, United Kingdom, Uruguay – 117,387,903; United States and Canada – 95,268,900; China – 86,742,449; Austria, Belgium, Bosnia and Herzegovina, Bulgaria, Cyprus, Czech Republic, Denmark, Estonia, Finland, Germany, Iceland, Ireland, Italy, Latvia, Lithuania, Luxembourg, Montenegro, North Macedonia, Norway, Poland, Portugal, Slovakia, Slovenia, Turkey – 19,795,480; South Korea – 13,977,692; Australia – 5,859,031)
Titanic	1997	400,129,533	Worldwide	(Note: Titanic: United States and United Kingdom – 167,200,000; Australia, Austria, China (before 2023), Mexico (before 2023), South Korea (before 2023), Sweden, Turkey (before 2023) – 71,915,571; France – 22,424,666; India – 20,000,000; Germany – 18,987,684; Brazil – 18,888,721; Japan – 18,053,361; Italy – 13,881,329; Spain – 11,833,345; Belgium, Croatia, Cyprus, Czech Republic (before 2023), Denmark, Estonia, Greece (before 2023), Iceland, Ireland, Latvia, Lithuania, Luxembourg, Portugal (before 2023), Slovakia (before 2023), Slovenia – 11,237,660; Argentina – 5,135,812; Poland – 3,859,644; Netherlands – 3,708,000; Switzerland – 2,067,441; Norway – 1,484,967; Chile and Ukraine – 1,478,885; Russia – 1,467,869; Romania – 1,386,486; China (re-release in 2023) – 1,276,817; Finland – 1,134,245; Hungary – 1,083,107; Mexico (re-release in 2023) – 592,300; Bulgaria – 473,203; South Korea (re-release in 2023) – 454,336; Turkey (re-release in 2023) – 76,470; Czech Republic (re-release in 2023) – 10,561; Portugal (re-release in 2023) – 5,475; Greece (re-release in 2023) – 5,100; United Arab Emirates – 4,398; Slovakia (re-release in 2023) – 2,080)
Mysterious Buddha (Shen mi de da fo)	1980	400,000,000	China	
Ji Hongchang	1979	380,000,000	China	
Avengers: Infinity War	2018	359,400,000	Worldwide	(Note: Avengers: Infinity War: Argentina, Australia, Brazil, Chile, Colombia, Mexico, Russia, South Korea, Ukraine, United States and Canada – 144,859,977; China – 62,908,947; Austria, Belgium, Bosnia and Herzegovina, Bulgaria, Croatia, Cyprus, Czech Republic, Denmark, Estonia, France, Germany, Greece, Iceland, Ireland, Italy, Latvia, Lithuania, Luxembourg, Montenegro, Morocco, Netherlands, North Macedonia, Norway, Portugal, Romania, Slovakia, Slovenia, Spain, Sweden, Turkey – 23,621,652; India – 17,400,000; United Kingdom – 9,800,000; Poland, Serbia, Venezuela – 2,741,809; Japan – 2,500,000; United Arab Emirates – 733,300; Hungary – 576,407; Switzerland – 312,709; Finland – 234,534)
Avatar	2009	356,600,000	Worldwide	(Note: Avatar: Argentina, Australia (re-release in 2022), Belgium, Brazil, Chile, China (before 2021), Colombia, Denmark (before 2022), Finland, Germany, Greece (before 2022), Hungary, India, Japan, Mexico, Netherlands (before 2022), Norway (before 2022), Portugal, Romania, Russia, Sweden, Switzerland, Turkey (before 2022), Ukraine, United Kingdom – 138,096,218; Austria, Bosnia and Herzegovina, Bulgaria, Croatia, Cyprus, Czech Republic, Denmark (re-release in 2022), Estonia, Georgia, Greece (re-release in 2022), Iceland, Ireland, Latvia, Lithuania, Luxembourg, Montenegro, Netherlands (re-release in 2022), Norway (re-release in 2022), Poland, Slovakia, Slovenia, United States (before 2022) and Canada – 116,002,590; Australia (before 2022), Israel, New Zealand, South Korea (before 2022), Venezuela – 30,093,318; France – 15,347,095; China (re-release in 2021) – 10,767,018; Spain – 9,977,226; Italy – 7,943,472; United States and Canada (re-release in 2022) – 2,695,095; South Korea (re-release in 2022) – 230,712; Turkey (re-release in 2022) – 103,742; United Arab Emirates – 42,199)
Star Wars	1977	338,400,000	Worldwide	
Spider-Man: Brand New Day †	2026	338,200,000	Worldwide	
Kai Qiang, Wei Ta Song Xing	1982	330,000,000	China	
Ne Zha 2	2025	327,804,962	China, Americas, Europe, Russia, SK	(Note: Ne Zha 2 admissions: China – 325,000,000; United States – 2,062,000; Russia – 171,400; France – 62,375; Other European countries – 423,584; South Korea – 66,134; Brazil – 19,469)
Caravan	1971	319,000,000	India, China	(Note: Caravan: China – 300,000,000; India – 19,000,000)
Spider-Man: No Way Home	2021	311,500,000	Worldwide	(Note: Spider-Man: No Way Home: United States and Canada – 89,000,000; Argentina, Australia, Brazil, Chile, Colombia, Croatia, Greece, Indonesia, Mexico, Netherlands, New Zealand, Poland, Romania, Russia, Saudi Arabia, Serbia, South Korea, Spain, Sweden, Switzerland, Turkey, Ukraine, United Arab Emirates, United Kingdom, Venezuela – 116,426,930; India – 11,000,000; France – 7,387,844; Austria, Belgium, Bosnia and Herzegovina, Bulgaria, Cyprus, Czech Republic, Denmark, Estonia, Finland, Hungary, Iceland, Ireland, Latvia, Lithuania, Luxembourg, Montenegro, North Macedonia, Norway, Portugal, Slovakia, Slovenia – 6,817,614; Germany – 4,671,011; Bolivia, Paraguay, Peru – 3,972,621; Italy – 3,411,339; Japan – 2,820,000)
Tunnel War	1965	300,000,000	China	
Gone with the Wind	1939	285,663,720	Worldwide	(Note: Gone with the Wind: United States and Canada – 205,034,697; United Kingdom – 35,000,000; France – 16,727,415; Denmark and Germany – 13,847,343; Australia – 10,824,637; Netherlands – 3,145,000; South Korea – 547,698; Japan – 501,377; European re-releases (2000–2022) – 35,553)
The Sound of Music	1965	283,300,000	Worldwide	
E.T. the Extra-Terrestrial	1982	276,998,207	Worldwide	
The Jungle Book	1967	264,936,054	Worldwide	(Note: The Jungle Book (1967) admissions: United States and United Kingdom – 220,500,000; Germany – 27,300,000; France, Sweden, Argentina, Spain, Denmark, Austria, Italy, Finland – 17,136,054)
The Ten Commandments	1956	262,000,000	Worldwide	
Black Panther	2018	261,200,000	Worldwide	(Note: Black Panther: United States – 76,900,000; Brazil, Chile, Colombia, Mexico, Russia, Ukraine, Venezuela – 26,179,100; Austria, Belgium, Bosnia and Herzegovina, Bulgaria, Croatia, Cyprus, Czech Republic, Denmark, Estonia, Finland, France, Greece, Hungary, Iceland, Ireland, Italy, Latvia, Lithuania, Luxembourg, Montenegro, Morocco, Netherlands, North Macedonia, Norway, Poland, Portugal, Romania, Slovakia, Slovenia, Spain, Sweden, Turkey, United Kingdom – 19,102,140; China – 18,405,278; South Korea – 5,399,327; Germany – 1,798,330; Japan – 1,030,000; Argentina – 932,645; Switzerland – 202,220)
Du Shiniang	1981	260,000,000	China	
A General Wearing the Sword (Pei jian jiang jun)	1983	260,000,000	China	
Little Heroes (Young Heroes)	1983	260,000,000	China	
Avatar: The Way of Water	2022	258,100,000	Worldwide	(Note: Avatar: The Way of Water: Argentina, Australia, Belgium, Brazil, Bulgaria, Canada, Croatia, Czech Republic, Chile, Colombia, Denmark, Finland, France, Germany, Greece, Hungary, India, Ireland, Italy, Lithuania, Mexico, Netherlands, Norway, Portugal, Romania, Russia, South Korea, Spain, Sweden, Switzerland, Turkey, Ukraine, United Kingdom, United States – 216,921,418; Bosnia and Herzegovina, Cyprus, Estonia, Georgia, Iceland, Latvia, Luxembourg, Montenegro – 360,895; China – 33,831,395; Japan - 2,352,966)
The Lion King	2019	255,800,000	Worldwide	(Note: The Lion King (2019): United States and Canada – 60,322,700; Argentina, Australia, Bolivia, Chile, Colombia, Mexico, Peru, Serbia, Sweden, Switzerland, Ukraine, United Arab Emirates – 41,151,749; Austria, Belgium, Bosnia and Herzegovina, Bulgaria, Croatia, Cyprus, Czech Republic, Denmark, Estonia, Finland, France, Germany, Greece, Hungary, Iceland, Ireland, Italy, Latvia, Lithuania, Luxembourg, Montenegro, Netherlands, North Macedonia, Norway, Poland, Portugal, Romania, Slovakia, Slovenia – 35,848,975; Brazil and Spain – 22,713,564; China – 22,493,782; Russia – 12,729,733; United Kingdom – 10,700,000; India – 10,900,000; South Korea – 4,743,295; Japan – 4,660,000; Turkey – 767,390)
Sholay (Embers)	1975	250,021,329	India, Soviet Union, Americas, Europe	(Note: Sholay: Up until 1985 – 250 million; Sholay released in following territories up until 1985 – India, Brazil, Portugal, United States, Soviet Union (where it sold 60 million tickets); European re-releases (2005–2015) – 21,329)
Doctor Zhivago	1965	248,200,000	Worldwide	
Jaws	1975	243,277,230	Worldwide	
The Fate of the Furious	2017	241,900,000	Worldwide	
The Odyssey †	2026	241,100,000	United States, United Kingdom	
The Burning of Imperial Palace	1983	240,000,000	China	
Star Wars: The Force Awakens	2015	239,342,931	Worldwide	(Note: Star Wars: The Force Awakens: Australia, Canada, Finland, France, Germany, Japan, Norway, Spain, Switzerland, United States – 151,915,216; China – 22,312,973; Argentina, Bolivia, Brazil, Colombia, Mexico, Paraguay, Peru, Ukraine, Uruguay – 20,110,326; Austria, Belgium, Bosnia and Herzegovina, Bulgaria, Croatia, Cyprus, Czech Republic, Denmark, Estonia, Georgia, Hungary, Iceland, Ireland, Italy, Latvia, Lithuania, Luxembourg, Montenegro, Morocco, Netherlands, Poland, Portugal, Romania, Slovakia, Slovenia, Sweden – 17,237,349; United Kingdom – 17,100,000; Russia – 5,797,705; South Korea – 3,273,879; Turkey – 1,149,225; Greece – 446,258)
Captain America: Civil War	2016	231,100,000	Worldwide	
Awaara (The Vagabond)	1951	230,100,000	India, Soviet Union, China, Turkey	(Note: Awaara: India – 30 million; China – 100 million; Soviet Union – 100 million; Turkey – 100,000 (opening))
Spider-Man 3	2007	220,400,000	Worldwide	(Note: Spider-Man 3: United States, Austria, Belgium, Czech Republic, Denmark, Estonia, Finland, Hungary, Iceland, Ireland, Latvia, Netherlands, Norway, Poland, Portugal, Quebec (Canada), Romania, Slovakia, Slovenia, Spain, Sweden, Switzerland, Turkey – 57,857,063; Brazil, China, Japan, Russia, South Korea, Ukraine – 24,387,326; India – 10,000,000; France and Italy – 9,576,880; United Kingdom – 6,700,000; Germany – 3,204,588)
Snow White and the Seven Dwarfs	1937	218,491,031	Worldwide	(Note: Snow White and the Seven Dwarfs: United States – 166,387,000; United Kingdom – 28,000,000; France – 18,353,225; Germany – 4,201,480; Italy – 1,330,316; European re-releases (2001–2022) – 218,888; South Korea – 122)
Zootopia 2	2025	218,299,424	USA, East Asia, Europe, Brazil	(Note: Zootopia 2: United States – 37,854,000; China – 117,000,000; France, Germany, Brazil, South Korea, Spain, Italy, Russia – 38,133,521; Japan – 11,701,390; United Kingdom – 4,600,000; Other European countries – 9,010,513)
The Exorcist	1973	214,900,000	Worldwide	
Jurassic World	2015	206,408,218	Worldwide	(Note: Jurassic World: United States – 77,500,000; China – 37,387,632; Australia, Belgium, Mexico, United Kingdom – 27,765,067; Austria, Bosnia and Herzegovina, Bulgaria, Croatia, Czech Republic, Denmark, Estonia, Finland, France, Greece, Hungary, Iceland, Ireland, Italy, Latvia, Lithuania, Luxembourg, Montenegro, Morocco, Netherlands, Norway, Poland, Portugal, Russia, Slovakia, Slovenia, Spain, Sweden, Turkey – 22,880,115; Argentina, Bolivia, Brazil, Chile, Colombia, Japan, Paraguay, Peru, Romania, Switzerland, Ukraine, Uruguay – 20,179,904; India – 11,000,000; South Korea – 5,547,463; Germany – 4,148,037)
Holy Robe of the Shaolin Temple	1985	200,000,000	China	
One Hundred and One Dalmatians	1961	199,800,000	Worldwide	
The Flying Son-in-Law (Fei lai de nü xu)	1982	199,500,000	China	
Furious 7	2015	199,233,440	Worldwide	(Note: Furious 7: United States and Canada – 41,938,896; Argentina, Australia, Brazil, Chile, China, Colombia, Mexico – 100,297,901; Austria, Belgium, Bosnia and Herzegovina, Bulgaria, Croatia, Czech Republic, Denmark, Estonia, Finland, France, Germany, Greece, Hungary, Iceland, Ireland, Latvia, Luxembourg, Montenegro, Morocco, Netherlands, North Macedonia, Norway, Poland, Portugal, Russia, Slovakia, Slovenia, Spain, Sweden, Turkey, United Kingdom – 33,601,457; India – 12,000,000; Bolivia, Lithuania, Paraguay, Peru, Switzerland, Ukraine, Uruguay – 3,872,927; South Korea – 3,248,904; Italy – 2,697,123; United Arab Emirates – 925,000; Romania – 651,232)
The Jungle Book	2016	193,700,000	Worldwide	(Note: The Jungle Book (2016) admissions: United States and United Kingdom – 48,300,000; China – 29,209,800; Other European countries and Morocco – 21,277,566; India – 20,000,000; South Korea – 2,537,438; Japan – 1,690,895; Australia – 1,644,551)
Jumanji: Welcome to the Jungle	2017	188,400,000	Worldwide	
Jurassic Park	1993	185,048,902	Worldwide	(Note: Jurassic Park: United States and United Kingdom – 115,400,000; Brazil, Denmark, Japan, Netherlands, Spain, Sweden – 22,582,550; India – 11,000,000; Germany – 9,395,450; China – 9,001,322; Italy – 7,338,000; France – 6,741,086; South Korea – 1,063,352; Hungary – 950,346; Romania – 760,748; European re-releases (1996–2022) – 498,164; Russia – 317,884)
Fantasia	1940	182,128,748	United States and France	
The Avengers	2012	178,700,000	Worldwide	(Note: The Avengers: United States, Austria, Belgium, Bulgaria, Canada, Croatia, Czech Republic, Denmark, Estonia, Greece, Hungary, Ireland, Italy, Latvia, Netherlands, North Macedonia, Norway, Poland, Portugal, Slovakia, Slovenia, Spain, Sweden, Turkey – 87,711,382; Argentina, Australia, Brazil, Chile, Mexico – 35,055,472; China and Romania – 13,521,881; United Kingdom – 9,600,000; Finland, Iceland, Japan, Russia, Ukraine – 7,863,137; South Korea – 7,087,068; France – 4,505,704; Germany – 2,261,073; Switzerland – 215,125)
Frozen 2	2019	177,007,599	Worldwide	(Note: Frozen II: France, Germany, Norway, Poland, Portugal, Russia, Serbia, South Korea, Sweden, Switzerland, Ukraine, United States and Canada – 95,933,859; China – 25,340,000; Austria, Belgium, Bosnia and Herzegovina, Bulgaria, Croatia, Cyprus, Czech Republic, Denmark, Estonia, Finland, Greece, Hungary, Iceland, Ireland, Italy, Latvia, Lithuania, Luxembourg, Montenegro, Netherlands, North Macedonia, Romania, Slovakia, Slovenia, Turkey, United Kingdom – 21,176,815; Mexico – 10,557,083; Japan – 10,440,000; Brazil – 7,972,757; Spain – 3,505,078; Argentina – 2,082,007)
Bohemian Rhapsody	2018	176,500,000	Worldwide	
Spider-Man: Far From Home	2019	174,100,000	Worldwide	(Note: Spider-Man: Far From Home: United States and Canada – 43,340,300; China – 39,380,000; Austria, Belgium, Bosnia and Herzegovina, Bulgaria, Croatia, Cyprus, Czech Republic, Denmark, Estonia, Finland, France, Germany, Greece, Hungary, Iceland, Ireland, Italy, Latvia, Lithuania, Luxembourg, Montenegro, Netherlands, North Macedonia, Norway, Poland, Portugal, Slovenia – 11,671,076; Mexico – 10,810,870; South Korea – 8,023,606; Brazil – 6,562,228; Russia – 5,646,679; United Kingdom – 5,300,000; Spain – 2,305,169; Japan – 2,100,000; India – 1,856,875; Argentina – 1,285,785; Turkey – 942,651; Ukraine – 747,063; Romania – 249,505; Switzerland – 171,621; Slovakia – 135,269)
Captain Marvel	2019	173,600,000	Worldwide	
Spider-Man: Homecoming	2017	172,200,000	Worldwide	(Note: Spider-Man: Homecoming: United States and Canada – 37,418,200; China – 21,891,581; Mexico – 9,846,562; Chile, South Korea, Venezuela – 8,872,619; Austria, Belgium, Bosnia and Herzegovina, Bulgaria, Croatia, Cyprus, Czech Republic, Denmark, Estonia, Finland, France, Germany, Greece, Hungary, Iceland, Ireland, Italy, Latvia, Lithuania, Luxembourg, Morocco, Netherlands, North Macedonia, Poland, Portugal, Romania, Slovakia, Slovenia, Sweden, Turkey – 8,706,778; Brazil – 6,715,848; United Kingdom – 4,100,000; Russia – 4,050,314; Japan – 1,930,000; Spain – 1,768,971; Argentina – 1,118,453; Norway – 192,088; Switzerland – 115,096)
The Birth of a Nation	1915	171,428,571	United States	
Lan dun bao xian xiang (Blue Shield Safe)	1983	170,000,000	China	
Ben-Hur	1959	168,893,565	Worldwide	(Note: Ben-Hur: United States and Canada – 104,996,416; Germany, Italy, Netherlands, United Kingdom – 44,509,000; France – 13,857,261; Spain – 4,653,194; South Korea – 873,163; European re-releases (1996–2021) – 4,531)
The Super Mario Bros. Movie	2023	168,100,000	Worldwide	
Avengers: Age of Ultron	2015	166,509,843	Worldwide	(Note: Avengers: Age of Ultron: United States, Brazil, Canada, Chile, Mexico, South Korea – 92,038,052; China – 36,609,750; Austria, Belgium, Bosnia and Herzegovina, Bulgaria, Croatia, Czech Republic, Denmark, Estonia, Finland, Greece, Hungary, Iceland, Ireland, Italy, Latvia, Lithuania, Montenegro, Morocco, Netherlands, Norway, Poland, Portugal, Slovakia, Slovenia, Spain, Sweden, Turkey, United Kingdom – 17,404,252; France and Russia – 10,362,923; Argentina, Bolivia, Colombia, Paraguay, Peru, Romania, Ukraine, Uruguay – 7,445,289; Germany – 2,423,753; Switzerland – 225,824)
The Lion King	1994	165,625,288	Worldwide	(Note: The Lion King (1994): United States – 101,100,000; Argentina, Austria, Belgium, Denmark, Finland, Sweden, United Kingdom – 14,461,270; Germany – 11,899,893; France – 10,744,990; Italy – 8,640,000; Spain – 6,457,397; European re-releases (1996–2021) – 4,332,546; Brazil – 4,288,244; Netherlands – 2,780,000; South Korea – 920,948)
Top Gun: Maverick	2022	165,600,000	Worldwide	(Note: Top Gun: Maverick: United States – 78,400,000; Australia, France, Germany, Hong Kong, Hungary, Japan, Netherlands, New Zealand, Poland, Saudi Arabia, South Korea, Sweden, Switzerland, United Arab Emirates – 33,314,847; Austria, Belgium, Bosnia and Herzegovina, Bulgaria, Croatia, Cyprus, Czech Republic, Denmark, Estonia, Finland, Greece, Iceland, Ireland, Italy, Latvia, Lithuania, Luxembourg, Montenegro, North Macedonia, Norway, Portugal, Slovakia, Slovenia, Turkey, United Kingdom – 21,503,030; Japan – 8,490,000; Brazil - 5,006,094; Mexico - 3,709,034; Spain - 1,547,440; Argentina - 1,040,000)
Harry Potter and the Philosopher's Stone	2001	164,512,878	Worldwide	(Note: Harry Potter and the Philosopher's Stone: Bulgaria, Cyprus, Czech Republic, Estonia, Finland, Iceland, Ireland, Latvia, Lithuania, Luxembourg, Netherlands, Norway, Poland, Portugal, Romania, Russia, Slovakia, Slovenia, Switzerland, United States and Canada – 69,490,876; United Kingdom – 17,560,000; Japan – 16,249,000; Australia, Brazil (before 2021), South Korea, Turkey – 14,605,597; Germany – 12,670,805; France – 9,608,331; Spain – 6,453,218; Italy – 6,066,711; China – 5,364,225; Austria, Belgium, Denmark, Sweden – 4,783,844; Hungary – 1,034,441; Brazil (re-release in 2021) – 368,830; Mexico – 257,000)
Aladdin	2019	161,600,000	Worldwide	(Note: Aladdin (2019) admissions: United States and Canada – 39,462,000; South Korea – 12,723,777; France, Germany, Spain – 9,737,259; Russia – 5,830,000; Other European countries – 16,637,870; China – 9,006,480; Japan – 8,550,000; Brazil - 4,788,803; India – 3,171,408; Australia – 1,719,352)
Inside Out 2	2024	161,300,000	Worldwide	
Juvenile Delinquents (Innocent Teenagers)	1985	161,000,000	China	
Jurassic World: Fallen Kingdom	2018	160,547,160	Worldwide	(Note: Jurassic World: Fallen Kingdom: Brazil, Chile, China, Colombia, Japan, Romania, Russia, South Korea, Venezuela – 73,185,038; United States and Canada – 45,944,200; Austria, Bosnia and Herzegovina, Bulgaria, Croatia, Cyprus, Czech Republic, Denmark, Estonia, Finland, France, Greece, Hungary, Iceland, Ireland, Italy, Latvia, Lithuania, Luxembourg, Montenegro, Netherlands, North Macedonia, Norway, Portugal, Slovakia, Slovenia, Sweden, Turkey, United Kingdom – 16,391,684; Belgium and Mexico – 14,683,754; Spain – 3,918,953; Germany – 2,404,197; Argentina – 2,332,076; Poland – 847,600; Ukraine – 635,251; Switzerland – 204,407)
Wolf Warrior 2	2017	160,322,273	China, North America, Europe, Korea	(Note: Wolf Warrior 2: China – 160,000,000; United States and Canada – 304,700; United Kingdom – 12,967; Germany – 3,358; South Korea – 1,248)
Incredibles 2	2018	159,064,742	Worldwide	(Note: Incredibles 2: Australia, Brazil, Chile, Colombia, Mexico, United States and Canada – 100,893,812; Austria, Belgium, Bosnia and Herzegovina, Bulgaria, Croatia, Cyprus, Czech Republic, Denmark, Estonia, Finland, France, Germany, Greece, Hungary, Iceland, Ireland, Italy, Latvia, Lithuania, Luxembourg, Montenegro, Morocco, Netherlands, North Macedonia, Norway, Romania, Slovakia, Slovenia, Spain, Sweden, Turkey, United Kingdom – 28,778,575; China – 10,122,096; Poland, Russia, Venezuela – 7,317,439; Japan – 4,060,000; Argentina – 3,530,866; South Korea – 3,033,105; Portugal – 606,756; Ukraine – 474,430; Switzerland – 247,663)
Star Wars: Episode I – The Phantom Menace	1999	158,978,082	Worldwide	(Note: Star Wars: Episode I – The Phantom Menace: Australia, Belgium, Finland, France, Japan, Netherlands, Sweden, United States and Canada – 115,027,885; United Kingdom – 13,590,000; Germany – 8,970,932; Austria, Bulgaria, Croatia, Cyprus, Czech Republic, Denmark, Estonia, Greece, Hungary, Iceland, Latvia, Lithuania, Luxembourg, North Macedonia, Norway, Poland, Portugal, Romania, Russia, Slovakia, Slovenia, Switzerland, Turkey – 7,510,482; Spain – 6,431,967; Brazil, Chile, Ukraine – 4,367,041; Italy – 2,333,121; South Korea – 746,654)
Pirates of the Caribbean: Dead Men Tell No Tales	2017	155,600,000	Worldwide	
Mission: Impossible – Fallout	2018	153,300,000	Worldwide	
Barbie	2023	152,200,000	Worldwide	(Note: Barbie: Argentina, Australia, Belgium, Brazil, Bulgaria, Croatia, Czech Republic, Chile, Colombia, Denmark, Finland, France, Germany, Greece, Hungary, Ireland, Italy, Lithuania, Mexico, Netherlands (before 2022), Norway, Portugal, Romania, Russia, Spain, Sweden, Switzerland, Turkey, Ukraine, United Kingdom – 88,174,702; United States – 61,200,000; Peru - 2,009,723; South Korea – 585,502; Japan - 126,916)
Baahubali 2: The Conclusion	2017	150,000,000	Worldwide	(Note: Baahubali 2 admissions: India – 120 million; United States and Canada – 2,255,500; China – 2,462,800; Europe – 257,556; Japan – 100,000)
Mother India	1957	150,000,000	Worldwide	(Note: Mother India admissions: India – 100 million+; France and United Kingdom (2002–2004) – 11,812)
Mughal-e-Azam	1960	150,000,000	Worldwide	(Note: Mughal-e-Azam admissions: India – 100 million+; United States and Canada (2005) – 25,200; United Kingdom (2002–2014) – 16,253)
The Lord of the Rings: The Return of the King	2003	149,735,814	Worldwide	(Note: The Lord of the Rings: The Return of the King: United States and Canada – 62,628,487; Australia, Austria, Belgium, Japan, Poland, Sweden – 19,020,298; United Kingdom – 15,220,000; Germany – 10,507,981; Argentina, Brazil, Chile, Denmark – 8,369,156; France – 7,404,926; Spain – 6,902,600; Bulgaria, Cyprus, Czech Republic, Estonia, Finland, Hungary, Iceland, Ireland, Latvia, Lithuania, Luxembourg, Netherlands, Portugal, Romania, Slovakia, Slovenia, Turkey – 6,506,258; South Korea – 5,990,349; Italy – 4,333,601; Norway – 1,015,608; Switzerland – 920,076; China – 777,986; Russia – 138,488)
Frozen	2013	142,925,342	Worldwide	(Note: Frozen: Austria, Belgium, Bulgaria, Croatia, Cyprus, Czech Republic, Estonia, Finland, Germany, Greece, Hungary, Iceland, Ireland, Italy, Latvia, Lithuania, Luxembourg, Montenegro, Netherlands, North Macedonia, Poland, Portugal, Russia, Slovenia, Spain, Sweden, Switzerland, Turkey, United Kingdom, United States and Canada – 81,195,156; Japan, Norway, South Korea – 30,841,405; Bolivia, China, Denmark, Mexico, Paraguay, Romania, Slovakia, Ukraine, Uruguay – 17,232,610; Argentina, Brazil, Chile, Colombia – 8,504,316; France – 5,151,855)
The Lord of the Rings: The Fellowship of the Ring	2001	142,597,767	Worldwide	(Note: The Lord of the Rings: The Fellowship of the Ring: Bulgaria, Cyprus, Czech Republic, Estonia, Finland, Hungary, Iceland, Ireland, Italy, Latvia, Lithuania, Luxembourg, Netherlands, Norway, Poland, Romania, Slovakia, Slovenia, Turkey, United States and Canada – 71,361,706; United Kingdom – 15,980,000; Brazil, Chile, Japan, South Korea – 15,740,324; Germany – 11,995,534; Australia, Austria, Belgium, Denmark, Sweden, Switzerland – 11,759,536; Spain – 7,146,859; France – 6,992,901; China – 1,403,290; Russia – 217,617)
Star Wars: The Last Jedi	2017	140,827,080	Worldwide	(Note: Star Wars: The Last Jedi: Australia, United States and Canada – 73,247,787; Austria, Belgium, Bosnia and Herzegovina, Bulgaria, Croatia, Cyprus, Czech Republic, Denmark, Estonia, Finland, Greece, Iceland, Ireland, Italy, Latvia, Lithuania, Luxembourg, Netherlands, North Macedonia, Norway, Poland, Portugal, Romania, Slovakia, Slovenia, Spain, Sweden, Turkey, United Kingdom – 27,743,468; China – 7,156,868; France – 7,080,049; Germany – 5,916,695; Japan – 5,050,000; Mexico – 4,370,000; Brazil – 3,519,279; Russia – 3,159,621; South Korea – 959,577; Hungary – 909,717; Argentina – 774,283; Switzerland – 482,506; Ukraine – 457,230)
Ne Zha	2019	140,020,454	China, United Kingdom, Ireland	
Dangal	2016	140,000,000	Worldwide	
The Red Snowball Tree	1974	140,000,000	Soviet Union	
Romance on Lushan Mountain	1980	140,000,000	China	
The Lord of the Rings: The Two Towers	2002	139,804,845	Worldwide	(Note: The Lord of the Rings: The Two Towers: United States and Canada – 58,911,205; Austria, Bulgaria, Cyprus, Czech Republic, Estonia, Finland, Germany, Greece, Hungary, Iceland, Ireland, Italy, Latvia, Lithuania, Luxembourg, Netherlands, Poland, Romania, Slovakia, Slovenia, Turkey – 24,599,566; United Kingdom – 14,400,000; Australia, Belgium, Denmark, Norway, Sweden, Switzerland – 10,978,015; Brazil, Japan, Portugal – 10,765,939; France – 7,110,078; Spain – 6,522,547; South Korea – 5,210,440; China – 1,155,917; Russia – 151,138)
Harry Potter and the Deathly Hallows – Part 2	2011	137,832,956	Worldwide	(Note: Harry Potter and the Deathly Hallows – Part 2: Austria, Belgium, Bosnia and Herzegovina, Bulgaria, Croatia, Czech Republic, Estonia, Finland, Greece, Iceland, Ireland, Latvia, Lithuania, Luxembourg, Netherlands, Poland, Portugal, Romania, Slovakia, Slovenia, Spain, Turkey, United Kingdom, United States and Canada – 71,151,347; Australia, Chile, China, Hong Kong, Japan, Mexico, Sweden, Ukraine – 32,209,845; Denmark, Germany, Hungary, Norway – 8,233,518; France – 6,561,608; Brazil – 5,577,927; Russia – 4,615,286; South Korea – 4,421,210; Italy – 2,722,416; Argentina – 1,823,869; Switzerland – 515,930)
Michael	2026	137,200,000	Worldwide	(Note: Michael admissions: United States – 32,732,000; Brazil, China, France, Germany, Italy, Spain – 23,502,526; Mexico – 6,950,000; United Kingdom – 6,600,000; South Korea – 1,624,177; Argentina – 1,009,907; United Arab Emirates – 578,316; Hungary – 399,286; Czech Republic – 280,961; Greece – 216,205; Bulgaria – 169,006; Finland – 162,670; Slovakia – 149,069)
Disco Dancer	1982	135,000,000	India, Soviet Union	(Note: Disco Dancer: Soviet Union – 120,000,000; India – 15,000,000)
The Super Mario Galaxy Movie	2026	134,900,000	Worldwide	(Note: The Super Mario Galaxy Movie admissions: United States – 37,762,000; Japan – 4,947,393; Brazil, China, France, Germany, Italy, Russia, Spain – 21,564,771; Mexico – 14,810,000; United Kingdom – 4,700,000; South Korea – 1,606,328; Argentina – 1,159,454; United Arab Emirates – 353,188; Czech Republic – 195,858; Greece – 164,368; Hungary – 140,369; Finland – 136,106; Bulgaria – 90,982; Slovakia – 78,585)
Some Like It Hot	1959	134,828,303	USA, Europe, Soviet Union	
Pirates of the Caribbean: Dead Man's Chest	2006	134,528,334	Americas, Europe, Japan, Korea	(Note: Pirates of the Caribbean: Dead Man's Chest: United States and Canada – 64,628,400; Europe (excluding Russia) – 45,005,547; Australia, Brazil, Japan, Russia, South Korea – 24,894,387)
Zorro	1975	133,050,124	Europe, China, Soviet Union	(Note: Zorro: China – 70,000,000; Soviet Union – 55,300,000; Italy – 4,900,000; France – 1,218,320; Spain – 1,013,104; Germany – 582 573; Denmark – 36,127)
Finding Nemo	2003	132,171,209	Worldwide	(Note: Finding Nemo: Bulgaria, Croatia, Czech Republic, Denmark, Estonia, Finland, Greece, Hungary, Iceland, Ireland, Lithuania, Luxembourg, Netherlands, Poland, Portugal, Romania, Russia, Slovakia, Slovenia, Sweden, Turkey, United States and Canada – 69,454,064; Australia, Austria, Belgium, France, Italy, Spain – 25,449,716; Argentina, Brazil, Japan, Norway – 16,220,936; United Kingdom – 9,790,000; Germany – 8,839,999; South Korea – 1,286,412; Switzerland – 1,130,082)
Skyfall	2012	130,400,000	Worldwide	
A Policeman with a Special Identity	1982	130,000,000	China	
Yellow River Fighter	1988	130,000,000	China	
Star Wars: The Empire Strikes Back	1980	129,984,978	United States, Europe, Japan, Seoul	(Note: Star Wars: The Empire Strikes Back: United States and United Kingdom – 107,270,600; France, Germany, Italy – 12,582,350; Japan – 8,291,840; Other European territories (1997–2016) – 1,762,184; Seoul City (South Korea) – 78,004)
Moana	2016	128,800,000	Worldwide	
The Godfather	1972	128,176,173	United States, Europe, South Korea	(Note: The Godfather: United States, Canada, United Kingdom – 89,922,600; Italy, France, Germany, Spain – 37,622,331; South Korea – 631,242)
Spider-Man	2002	127,660,617	Worldwide	(Note: Spider-Man: United States and United Kingdom – 76,900,000; Austria, Belgium, Bulgaria, Cyprus, Czech Republic, Denmark, Estonia, Finland, Germany, Hungary, Iceland, Ireland, Italy, Latvia, Lithuania, Luxembourg, Netherlands, Norway, Poland, Quebec (Canada), Romania, Slovakia, Spain, Sweden, Switzerland, Turkey – 22,457,556; Brazil and France – 14,965,620; Argentina, Australia, Japan – 10,161,873; China – 2,050,000; South Korea – 1,125,568)
Avatar: Fire and Ash	2025	127,500,000	Worldwide	
Deadpool & Wolverine	2024	127,100,000	Worldwide	
Star Wars: Return of the Jedi	1983	126,255,825	United States, Europe, Japan, Seoul	(Note: Star Wars: Return of the Jedi: United States, United Kingdom, Spain – 104,787,854; France, Germany, Italy – 12,207,226; Japan – 8,048,438; Other European territories (1997–2017) – 1,030,424; Seoul City (South Korea) – 181,883)
The Battle at Lake Changjin	2021	125,059,009	China	(Note: The Battle at Lake Changjin admissions: China – 125,000,000; United States – 37,381; Europe – 11,574)
Spartacus	1960	124,783,920	USA, Canada, Europe, Soviet Union	
Beauty and the Beast	2017	124,368,330	Americas, Europe, Morocco, Asia	(Note: Beauty and the Beast (2017) admissions: United States and Canada – 56,798,200; Europe and Morocco – 33,919,225; China – 15,841,104; Japan – 9.5 million; Brazil - 8,309,801; South Korea – 5,138,330)
Independence Day	1996	124,051,234	Americas, Europe, Japan, Korea	(Note: Independence Day: United States and Canada – 69,268,900; Europe (excluding United Kingdom) – 32,020,189; United Kingdom – 10.79 million; Japan – 7.75 million; Brazil - 3,298,922; South Korea – 923,223)
The Sting	1973	123,048,854	United States, Europe, South Korea	(Note: The Sting: United States and United Kingdom – 100,229,200; France, Germany, Italy, Spain – 22,487,149; South Korea – 329,335; Czech Republic, Denmark, Slovakia, Sweden, Switzerland – 3,170)
Shrek 2	2004	123,023,527	Americas, Europe, South Korea	(Note: Shrek 2: United States and Canada – 71,050,900; Europe (excluding Russia) – 44,617,071; Argentina, Australia, Brazil, Chile, Russia, South Korea – 7,355,556)
Jumanji: The Next Level	2019	122,600,000	Worldwide	
Thunderball	1965	122,235,389	Europe, United States, Canada	(Note: Thunderball: United Kingdom, United States, Canada, Germany – 102.4 million; France and Italy – 19,834,842; Denmark and Switzerland (1999–2001) – 547)
The Dark Knight Rises	2012	121,771,548	Worldwide	
Hi, Mom	2021	121,002,451	China, Taiwan, Switzerland	
Great Shanghai 1937 (Da Shang Hai 1937)	1986	121,000,000	China	
Despicable Me 3	2017	120,392,387	Worldwide	(Note: Despicable Me 3: United States – 29,501,000; Brazil, China, Russia, South Korea, Spain – 53,688,840; United Kingdom – 6,400,000; Japan – 6,220,000; Other European countries – 24,582,547)
At Middle Age (Ren dao zhong nian)	1982	120,000,000	China	
She an	1983	120,000,000	China	
Iron Man 3	2013	118,200,000	Worldwide	
Grease	1978	117,075,584	Worldwide	
Fast & Furious Presents: Hobbs & Shaw	2019	116,800,000	Worldwide	
Cleopatra	1963	116,470,333	North America, Europe, USSR, Korea	(Note: Cleopatra: United States and Canada – 67,183,500; Soviet Union – 32,900,000; France, Germany, Italy – 16,376,099; South Korea – 9,192; United Kingdom, Spain, Latvia (2011–2017) – 1,542)
The Dark Knight	2008	116,062,961	Worldwide	(Note: The Dark Knight: United States and Canada – 74,513,397; Austria, Belgium, Bulgaria, Croatia, Czech Republic, Denmark, Estonia, Finland, France, Hungary, Iceland, Ireland, Italy, Latvia, Lithuania, Netherlands, Norway, Poland, Portugal, Romania, Slovakia, Slovenia, Sweden, Switzerland, Turkey, United Kingdom – 20,024,004; Argentina, Australia, Brazil, Russia, Spain, Ukraine – 14,436,953; South Korea – 4,228,360; Germany – 2,860,247)
The Sixth Sense	1999	114,488,893	Americas, Europe, Asia, Australia	(Note: The Sixth Sense admissions: United States – 57,800,000; Germany, Spain, Italy – 13,671,308; France – 7,800,000; Other European countries – 16,424,177; Argentina, Australia, Brazil – 10,495,647; Japan – 7,500,000; South Korea (Seoul City) – 797,761)
Rogue One: A Star Wars Story	2016	113,043,258	Worldwide	(Note: Rogue One: A Star Wars Story: United States and Canada – 60,441,600; France, Germany, Italy, Spain – 13,266,243; Brazil - 2,861,365; Russia – 2.44 million; Other European territories – 16,891,241; China – 13,043,500; Japan – 3,080,000; South Korea – 1,019,309)
Mirage (Hai shi shen lou)	1987	113,000,000	China	
Jurassic World Dominion	2022	111,500,000	Worldwide	
Our Niu Baisui (Zan men de niu bai sui)	1983	110,000,000	China	
Raiders of the Lost Ark	1981	107,227,185	Americas, Europe, Brazil, Seoul City	(Note: Raiders of the Lost Ark: United States and Canada – 88,543,400; France, Germany, Italy, Spain – 14,060,685; Brazil - 3,728,299; Denmark – 521,650; Seoul City (South Korea) – 348,489; Switzerland, Finland, United Kingdom, Netherlands, Sweden (1998–2016) – 24,662)
The Revenant	2015	106,800,000	Worldwide	
Doctor Strange in the Multiverse of Madness	2022	106,300,000	Worldwide	
The Wandering Earth	2019	105,967,500	China, United States, Canada	(Note: The Wandering Earth: China – 105,316,900; 105 million tickets for original release.; 316,900 tickets for The Wandering Earth: Beyond 2020 Special Edition.; United States and Canada – 650,600)
Spider-Man 2	2004	105,932,203	Worldwide	(Note: Spider-Man 2: United States and United Kingdom – 66,300,000; Brazil, Japan, Norway – 12,869,224; Austria, Belgium, Bulgaria, Czech Republic, Denmark, Estonia, Finland, Hungary, Iceland, Ireland, Latvia, Luxembourg, Netherlands, Poland, Portugal, Quebec (Canada), Romania, Slovakia, Slovenia, Spain, Sweden, Switzerland, Turkey, United Kingdom – 9,549,508; France and Italy – 8,948,733; Germany – 3,291,034; China – 2,606,000; South Korea – 2,367,704)
Crocodile Dundee	1986	105,877,673	Australia, USA, Europe, Soviet Union	
Mary Poppins	1964	105,507,268	United States, Canada, Europe	(Note: Mary Poppins: United States and Canada – 78,181,800; United Kingdom – 14 million; France, Germany, Spain – 13,325,468)
Detective Chinatown 2	2018	105,500,000	Worldwide	
Bobby	1973	105,400,000	India, Soviet Union	(Note: Bobby admissions: India – 42.5 million; Soviet Union – 62.9 million)
Minions: The Rise of Gru	2022	104,600,000	Worldwide	
The Hobbit: An Unexpected Journey	2012	102,947,949	Worldwide	(Note: The Hobbit: An Unexpected Journey: Argentina, Brazil, China, Iceland, Japan, Mexico, Ukraine, United States and Canada – 55,031,151; Australia, Czech Republic, Germany, Romania, United Kingdom – 19,239,789; Austria, Belgium, Bulgaria, Croatia, Denmark, Estonia, Finland, France, Greece, Italy, Latvia, Lithuania, Montenegro, Netherlands, North Macedonia, Norway, Poland, Portugal, Slovakia, Slovenia, Sweden, Switzerland, Turkey – 17,820,854; Russia – 4,651,000; Spain – 3,013,662; South Korea – 2,830,614; Hungary – 360,879)
Oppenheimer	2023	102,700,000	Worldwide	
The Glacier Fox	1978	103,700,000	Japan, China, United States	(Note: The Glacier Fox admissions: Japan – 2,300,000; China – 100,000,000; United States – 1,400,000)
Forrest Gump	1994	101,939,833	Americas, Europe, South Korea	(Note: Forrest Gump: United States and Canada – 78,637,200; France, Germany, Italy, Spain – 18,065,321; Austria, Denmark, Finland, Netherlands, Sweden – 3,103,792; Brazil - 1,417,315; South Korea – 705,143; Belgium, Czech Republic, Romania, Switzerland, United Kingdom (1996–2017) – 11,062)
The Hobbit: The Battle of the Five Armies	2014	101,523,762	Worldwide	(Note: The Hobbit: The Battle of the Five Armies: Austria, Bosnia and Herzegovina, Bulgaria, Croatia, Cyprus, Czech Republic, Estonia, Finland, Greece, Hungary, Iceland, Ireland, Latvia, Lithuania, Luxembourg, Montenegro, Morocco, North Macedonia, Norway, Poland, Portugal, Russia, Slovakia, Slovenia, Sweden, Turkey, United Kingdom, United States and Canada – 52,496,319; China – 19,162,500; Denmark, Germany, Netherlands, Romania – 8,382,526; France – 4,848,676; Mexico – 4,750,139; Brazil – 3,603,648; South Korea – 2,841,382; Spain – 2,298,553; Italy – 1,799,989; Argentina – 820,947; Switzerland – 519,083)
First Blood	1982	101,187,271	North America, Europe, China, Korea	(Note: First Blood: United States and Canada – 16,058,800; China – 76 million; France, Spain, Italy – 6,428,836; Germany – 2,416,703; South Korea – 282,932)
Moana 2	2024	100,600,000	Worldwide	
Goldfinger	1964	100,150,318	UK, USA, Canada, Europe, Korea	(Note: Goldfinger: United Kingdom, United States, Canada, France, Germany, Netherlands – 100,148,099; Denmark, Norway, Romania, Spain, Switzerland (1999–2017) – 1,490; South Korea – 729)
The War at Sea from Hawaii to Malaya	1942	100,000,000	Japan	
Amphibian Man	1962	100,000,000	Soviet Union	
Sandakan No. 8	1974	100,000,000	Japan, China	
Dong fang jian	1982	100,000,000	China	
Zhou Enlai	1991	100,000,000	China	

== See also ==
- Lists of highest-grossing films
  - List of highest-grossing films
  - List of highest-grossing non-English films
- List of animated films by box office admissions
