= Cinema of North America =

Cinema of North America generally refers collectively to the film industries of the United States, Mexico, and Canada.

Unlike in Mexico, The term is cultural rather than geographic; the film industries of Cuba is normally considered part of Latin American cinema.

== See also ==
- Cinema of the United States
  - Film in Florida
- Cinema of Canada
  - Cinema of Quebec
- Cinema of Mexico
- World cinema
