= Ouw Peh Tjoa =

Ouw Peh Tjoa 烏白蛇 Two Snakes, One White and One Black Dua Siluman, Ular Putih dan Hitam
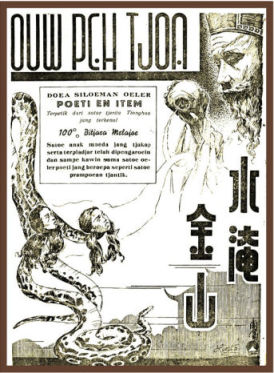
- One sheet
- Directed by: The Teng Chun
- Produced by: The Teng Chun
- Cinematography: The Teng Chun
- Production company: Cino Motion Pictures
- Release date: 1934 (Dutch East Indies)
- Countries: Dutch East Indies (now Indonesia)
- Languages: Malay; Hokkien Mandarin

Ouw Peh Tjoa (Chinese: 烏白蛇; Pe̍h-ōe-jī: O͘ Pe̍h Chôa; Hokkien for Black and White Snakes), also known by the Malay-language title Doea Siloeman Oeler Poeti en Item (meaning Two Snakes, One White and One Black), is a 1934 film from the Dutch East Indies (now Indonesia). It was directed and produced by The Teng Chun. Adapted from Legend of the White Snake, a Chinese folktale, it follows a magical snake who passes as a human but ultimately dies. The film, now possibly lost, was followed by one sequel, Anaknja Siloeman Oeler Poeti, in 1936.

== Plot ==
After meditating for several hundred years, a magical white snake transforms into a beautiful woman. Her competitor, a black snake, does likewise. The two compete for the love of a man named Khouw Han Boen. Ultimately Khouw agrees to marry the (former) white snake, but when her true identity is revealed he attempts to cancel their wedding. The snake-woman, crying, tells Khouw's boss that they are to be married, and ultimately Khouw is guilted into marrying her.

As time passes, Khouw sees his wife occasionally transform into a snake. She is always, however, able to convince him otherwise. He falls further in love with her, and their marriage is a happy one. After several months he is accosted by a priest, Hoat Hae Sian Soe, who then leads an attempt to kill the snake-woman. She escapes, pursued by the priests.

The priests catch the snake and prepare to kill her, but are stopped by the goddess Kwan Im, who tells the stunned pursuers that the snake is pregnant and thus must not be killed. A month after the snake gives birth, the priests return. The snake-woman gives her child to Khouw and then surrenders herself to her fate. She is captured in a magical jar and brought away.

== Production ==
Ouw Peh Tjoa was directed and produced by The Teng Chun for his company, Cino Motion Pictures. Since releasing Sam Pek Eng Tay in 1931, based on the legend of the Butterfly Lovers, The Teng Chun had released a series of films based on Chinese legends and folktales, including Pat Bie To (Eight Beautiful Women; 1932) and Pat Kiam Hiap (Eight Swordsmen; 1933). These stories were selected because the peranakan Chinese in the Indies were unable to understand Mandarin and Cantonese imports from China, but wanted to see films based on Chinese mythology. Overall, The Teng Chun's films emphasised the martial art silat and were generally profitable, allowing him to dominate the industry.

The cast of this black-and-white film is unrecorded. The dialogue, captured by the film's director-cum-producer, was in Malay. The snakes used in the production of this film came from The Teng Chun's personal zoo.

== Release and reception ==
According to The, in a 1970s interview, Ouw Peh Tjoa was released in 1934. Newspaper advertisements show the film being screened by February 1935. The film mostly targeted ethnic Chinese audiences. Advertising material, however, emphasised the use of spoken Malay and described the film as "full of astonishments and all forms of magic fights"; (Note: Original: "Penoe dengan keheranan rame dengan perkelahian roepa-roepa popwee adjaib.") through these action sequences, Ouw Peh Tjoa proved popular among native audiences. The film was exported to Singapore, part of the Straits Settlements, where there was a large ethnic Chinese population.

The success of Ouw Peh Tjoa allowed The Teng Chun to import new equipment for his studio (renamed Java Industrial Film), which he used in his future productions. The film was followed in 1936 by a sequel, Anaknja Siloeman Oeler Poeti (Child of the White Snake). The Teng Chun continued releasing films based on Chinese legends until 1937, a year after Albert Balink's Pareh changed domestic perceptions of profitable film storylines. The's later films adapted stories closer to the native populace of the Indies and focussing on events that could happen in day-to-day life. Through 1940 and 1941 Java Industrial Films was the most productive studio in the Indies, until it was shut down during the Japanese occupation which began in March 1942.

Screenings of Ouw Peh Tjoa continued until at least 1953. The film is now likely lost. Movies were then shot on flammable nitrate film, and after a fire destroyed much of Produksi Film Negara's warehouse in 1952, old films shot on nitrate were deliberately destroyed. As such, the American visual anthropologist Karl G. Heider writes that all Indonesian films from before 1950 are lost. However, JB Kristanto's Katalog Film Indonesia (Indonesian Film Catalogue) records several as having survived at Sinematek Indonesia's archives, and Biran writes that several Japanese propaganda films have survived at the Netherlands Government Information Service.

== Works cited ==
- Biran, Misbach Yusa (2009). Sejarah Film 1900–1950: Bikin Film di Jawa [History of Film 1900–1950: Making Films in Java] (in Indonesian). Jakarta: Komunitas Bamboo working with the Jakarta Art Council. ISBN 978-979-3731-58-2.
- Biran, Misbach Yusa (2012). "Film di Masa Kolonial" [Film in the Colonial Period]. Indonesia dalam Arus Sejarah: Masa Pergerakan Kebangsaan [Indonesia in the Flow of Time: The Nationalist Movement] (in Indonesian). Ministry of Education and Culture. pp. 268–93. ISBN 978-979-9226-97-6.
- Heider, Karl G (1991). Indonesian Cinema: National Culture on Screen. Honolulu: University of Hawaii Press. ISBN 978-0-8248-1367-3.
- Hutari, Fandy (5 November 2011). "Sejarah Awal Industri Film di Hindia Belanda" [Early History of Films in the Dutch East Indies]. Jakarta Beat (in Indonesian). Jakarta. Archived from the original on 28 September 2013.
- "Ouw Peh Tjoa". filmindonesia.or.id (in Indonesian). Jakarta: Konfiden Foundation. Archived from the original on 29 September 2013.
- "(untitled)". De Indische Courant (in Dutch). Surabaya: [s.n.] 5 February 1935. p. 13.
- "(untitled)". De Nieuwsgier (in Dutch). Jakarta: [s.n.] 26 January 1953. p. 3. Archived from the original on 27 September 2013.
