= List of Chinese films of 1992 =

A list of mainland Chinese films released in 1992:

Title	Director	Cast	Genre	Notes
Bell of Purity Temple	Xie Jin	Pu Cunxin, Komaki Kurihara	Drama	
Bloody Morning	Li Shaohong		Drama	Adapted from Chronicle of a Death Foretold by Gabriel García Márquez
Divorce Wars	Chen Guoxing	Ge You, Ma Xiaoqing	Drama	
Family Portrait	Li Shaohong		Drama	
God of the Mountains	Huang Jianzhong	Ge Lili, Wang Fuli, Shen Junyi	Drama	
A Lady Left Behind	Hu Xueyang		Drama	
Mountains of the Sun	Wu Ziniu		Drama	
Once Conned	He Qun, Liu Baolin	Ge You	Comedy	
Ripples Across Stagnant Water	Ling Zifeng	Xu Qing	Romantic Drama	Adapted from Ripple on Stagnant Water by Li Jieren
San Mao Joins the Army	Zhang Jianya		Comedy	
The Story of Qiu Ju	Zhang Yimou	Gong Li	Comedy/Drama	Golden Lion winner of 1992
The Vanished Woman	He Qun, Liu Baolin	Ge You	Drama	
Zhou Enlai	Ding Yinnan	Chen Huiliang	Biographical	

== See also ==
- 1992 in China
