= Another Me =

Another Me may refer to:

- Another Me, a novel by Catherine MacPhail
  - Another Me (2013 film), an adaptation of the above novel directed by Isabel Coixet
- Another Me (2022 film), a Chinese comedy film
- Another Me (Charlene Choi EP), a 2009 EP by Charlene Choi
- Another Me (Kim Sung-kyu EP), a 2012 EP by Kim Sung-kyu
- "Another Me", a song on the 2006 album Before the Bleeding Sun by Eternal Tears of Sorrow
- "Another Me "In Lack'ech", a song on the 2005 album Consign to Oblivion by Epica
- Another Me (TV series), a 2019 Chinese television series
