= Zhang Chiyu =

Chinese filmmaker

- 张吃鱼
- Born: Zhang Chiyu (张迟昱); 9 February 1986 (age 40); Jiaxing, Zhejiang, China
- Education: Beijing Institute of Graphic Communication
- Occupations: Film director, screenwriter, producer
- Years active: 2017–present
- Agent: Mahua FunAge

Chinese name
- Simplified Chinese: 张吃鱼
- Traditional Chinese: 張吃魚
Transcriptions
Standard Mandarin
- Hanyu Pinyin: Zhāng Chīyú

Birth name
- Simplified Chinese: 张迟昱
- Traditional Chinese: 張遲昱
Transcriptions
Standard Mandarin
- Hanyu Pinyin: Zhāng Chíyù

Zhang Chiyu (Chinese: 张吃鱼; born 9 February 1986) is a Chinese film director, screenwriter and producer best known for his directorial films such as Never Say Die and Moon Man.

== Biography ==
Zhang was born in Jiaxing, Zhejiang, on 9 February 1986, and graduated from Beijing Institute of Graphic Communication. During his college years, he published two online novels, My Model Neighbor and Youth is a Turmoil.

In 2017, Zhang made his directorial debut Never Say Die with Song Yang. The film is the third highest-grossing in China in 2017 and the sixth highest-grossing ever in the country, with a gross of CN¥2.181 billion (US$334 million). He was nominated for Best Director and Best Young Director at the 9th China Film Director's Guild Awards and Best New Director at the 23rd Huading Awards.

In 2022, Zhang directed Moon Man, a science fiction comedy film starring Shen Teng and Ma Li. Moon Man grossed a total of $460.3 million at the Chinese box office, which making it the eleventh-highest-grossing film of 2022.

== Filmography ==
=== As director ===
Year	English title	Chinese title	Ref.
2017	Never Say Die	羞羞的铁拳	co-director Song Yang
2022	Moon Man	独行月球	

=== As screenwriter ===
Year	English title	Chinese title	Ref.
2017	Never Say Die	羞羞的铁拳	co-scriptwriter Song Yang
2022	Moon Man	独行月球	co-screenwriter Qian Chenguang/ Dai Si'ao/ Shen Yuyue

=== As producer ===
Year	English title	Chinese title	Ref.
2020	Dear, Did You Not Expect It	亲爱的没想到吧	
2022	Moon Man	独行月球	

== Film and TV Awards ==
Year	Nominated work	Award	Category	Result	Ref.
2018	Never Say Die	9th China Film Director's Guild Awards	Best Young Director	Nominated	
2018	Never Say Die	9th China Film Director's Guild Awards	Best Director	Nominated	
2018	Never Say Die	23rd Huading Awards	Best New Director	Nominated	
