= Wu Hu Jiang (band) =

Taiwanese boy band

- Traditional Chinese: 武虎將
- Simplified Chinese: 武虎将
Transcriptions
Standard Mandarin
- Hanyu Pinyin: Wǔ Hǔ Jiàng
Yue: Cantonese
- Jyutping: Mou^{5} Fu^{2} Zoeng^{3}

Wu Hu Jiang (traditional Chinese: 武虎將; simplified Chinese: 武虎将) was a Taiwanese boy band formed in early 2009. Their name is a reference to the Five Tiger Generals in the series of K.O.3an Guo. Band members included George Hu, Benjamin Wang (leader of the band), Shao Xiang, Si Wei Hong Zheng, and Bo Yan. Bo Yan left the band in late 2009 owing to their company's decision that a four-member band would be "easier to operate with". The band was disbanded in 2011.

== History ==
The band was created in 2009. Their name is a reference to the Five Tiger Generals in the series of K.O.3an Guo. It consisted of four members: George Hu, Benjamin Wang (leader of the band), Shao Xiang, and Si Wei Hong Zheng. They were originally five, but because the company adopted the philosophy that "it is easier to operate with four people", the fifth member Bo Yan was forced to leave the group around October 2009. Other members protested the decision to management but the company stood firm.

The band was different from other boy bands in that its members were not new to the industry. While Wang, Bo Yan, and Luo had previously been EeLin Entertainment models, Hu had previously played the second male lead in numerous television series. Shao Xiang had previously entered the entertainment industry without becoming well-known, after which he had to serve in the army.

The group starred in the highly-rated TV series K.O.3an Guo, which was broadcast China Entertainment Television and TVB's TVB J2 channel. According to United Daily News, they became instantly popular through their performances in the TV series. The newspaper said the band had a strong relationship. To keep each other motivated to be on time during filming, they reached an agreement that anyone late would have to pay a fine. Collected by their oldest member Shao Xiang, the money would contribute to their funds for a communal meal. To advertise the TV series, the group traveled to Hong Kong to meet with fans. In a collaboration with Champion Band and Dong Cheng Wei, the band sang the series' theme song "Rival" (Chinese: 對手). The band members made a guest appearance at a 2009 Soul Eater cosplay event. The members discussed their favorite characters and praised the manga series. On 11 September 2009, the band released an autobiographical photo-book titled (Chinese: 我愛武虎將). Over 10,000 copies of the book were printed in the first printing.

In 2010, the boy band Fahrenheit and Wu Hu Jiang, which were part of the same company, boarded the same Shenzhen flight since both had events there. Whereas Fahrenheit members were given business-class seats, Wu Hu Jiang members were given economy-class seats. A spokesperson explained that Wu Hu Jiang had received training in Japan and was the company's focus. The company's aim with giving them economy-class seats was to prevent the Wu Hu Jiang members from being "spoiled", the spokesperson said.

The group disbanded in 2011 owing to various factors. Si Wei Hong had to join the military, while George Hu was struggling to reach an agreement with his artist management contract. Benji did not appear in Hayate the Combat Butler owing to a stage play scheduling conflict. George Hu is the only member to maintain his stage name while most of his teammates have a change of name.

== Members ==
=== George Hu ===
Name: 胡宇崴 / Hu Yu Wei
English name: George Hu
Birthdate: 1982-Jul-24
Birthplace: New York
Nationality: American/Taiwanese

=== Benji ===
Name: 班傑 / Benji
Birth name: Benjamin H. Wang
Occupation: Actor, model and singer
Birthdate: 1982-May-20
Birthplace: Oklahoma,USA

=== Shao Xiang ===
Name: 李紹祥 / Li Shao Xiang
Also known as: 邵翔 / Shao Xiang
English Name: Sean
Occupation: Actor / Model / Singer
Birthdate: 1982 April 07
Birthplace: Taiwan

=== Si Wei Hong Zheng ===
True name: Luo Hong Zheng (羅弘証)
English name: Wes
Birthdate: July 26, 1989
Birthplace: Taiwan
Occupation: Actor / singer / model

== Filmography ==
2004

- Say Yes Enterprise (Shao Xiang)

2005

- It Started with a Kiss (Shao Xiang as Zhang Wu Ren)

2006

- Emerald on the Roof (George)

2007

- Love at First Fight (George as Lei Da Sheng)
- The X-Family (George as Shen Xing Zhe / Qiang Ling Wang)
- Romantic Princess (George)
- Wayward Kenting (Shao Xiang)

2008

- Hot Shot (Bo Yan and George)
- Love Catcher as Mark (Benji as Mark)

2009

- ToGetHer (George as Jia Sen)
- K.O.3an Guo (George as Guan Yu, Bo Yan as Zhang Fei, Shao Xiang as Ma Chao, Si Wei Hong Zheng as Huang Zhong and Benji as Zhao Yun)
- Black & White (Benji as Sarkozy G)

2010

- The M Riders (Bo Yan)
- Gloomy Salad Days (Si Wei Hong Zheng)

2011

- Hayate the Combat Butler (George, Shao Xiang, and Si Wei Hong Zheng)
- Sunny Girl (Shao Xiang)

2012

- Summer Fever (George as Lin Ming Kuan (A Kuan))

2012

- Love, Now (George as Lan Shi De)

2013

- Set Love Around (George as Zhou Zhen)
