= Dad Is Back =

- Title screen
- Also known as: Dad Is Home, Dad Come Back
- 爸爸回来了; Bàba Huílaile
- Genre: Reality television
- Created by: KBS
- Starring: Current: Jia Nailiang 賈乃亮; Li Xiapeng 李小鵬; Du Jiang 杜江; Zheng Jun 鄭鈞; Former: Wang Zhong Lei 王中磊; Wu Chun 吳尊; Jason Tang 唐志中
- Country of origin: China
- Original languages: Mandarin; English
- No. of seasons: 2
- No. of episodes: 16

Production
- Executive producer: Gao Ya 高雅
- Producer: Cen Junyi 岑俊義
- Production locations: Mainland China, Brunei, Taiwan
- Camera setup: Multicamera setup
- Running time: 90 minutes

Original release
- Network: ZRTG: Zhejiang Television
- Release: April 24 – July 10, 2014

Related
- The First Time 人生第一次; The Voice of China 3 中国好声音 3; The Return of Superman

Dad Is Back (Chinese: 爸爸回来了; pinyin: Bàba Huílaile) is a Chinese reality-variety show that airs on ZRTG's Zhejiang Television, starring former Taiwanese boy band Fahrenheit member Wu Chun, film producer and president of Huayi Brothers film production company Zhong Lei Wang, actor Jia Nailiang, and former national gymnast Li Xiapeng. The show began airing on April 24, 2014, Thursday nights at 10:00 PM Beijing Time with 12 episodes total.

== Synopsis ==
Celebrity dads are left to care for their kids alone for 48 hours without the help of anyone, while their wives leaves the home.

== Development ==
The show is adapted from South Korean reality show The Return of Superman, about celebrity dads taking care of their real-life children, without their wives, on their own for 48 hours. The production team from Dad Is Back collaborated with the Korean production team from The Return of Superman on the show. To avoid plagiarism rumors, the Chinese title was renamed instead of following the Korean title.

== Format ==
The show is filmed with multiple cameras set up in the celebrities home. Unlike the Korean version, on early episodes cameraman's are clearly visible and not hidden in tents or playhouses. Starting from episode 5 tents and playhouses are used to hide the cameraman's presence in the dads home. Filming takes place at each of the celebrities actual home or work place. Family and friends of the celebrity dads will occasionally show up in each episode. Also unlike its Korean counterpart there is no narrator, a recorded track of a child's voice saying "Daddy" is played when one segment is shown to the next.

== Cast ==
=== Current cast ===
promo poster of the original cast. From left to right: Jia Nailiang, Wang Zhong Lei, Wu Chun and Li Xiapeng

Duration	Dad	Children	Mom/Wife	Filming location
Season 1 - Present	Li Xiaopeng 李小鵬	Daughter - Li Xin Qi (Olivia) 李馨琪; DOB: January 12, 2012	"Angel" Li An Qi 李安琪^{5}	Beijing, China
Season 1 - Present	Jia Nailiang 賈乃亮	Daughter - Jia Yun Xin (Tian Xin) 賈雲馨 (甜馨); DOB: October 23, 2012	Li Xiaolu 李小璐	Beijing, China
Season 2 - Present	Du Jiang 杜江	Son - Du Yuqi 杜宇麒; DOB: September 19, 2013	Huo Siyan 霍思燕	Beijing, China
Season 2 - Present	Zheng Jun 鄭鈞	Son - Zheng Xingfu 鄭熙岳 (Jagger); DOB: October 23, 2010	Liu Yun 劉芸	Beijing, China
Season 2 - Present	Jason Tang 唐志中	Daughter - Tang Yujia 唐宇嘉; DOB: July 23, 2011	Zhang Ting Qie 張庭緁	Taipei, Taiwan
Season 2 - Present	Jason Tang 唐志中	Daughter - Tang Haiyun 唐海云; DOB: October 23, 2012	Zhang Ting Qie 張庭緁	Taipei, Taiwan

=== Former cast ===
Duration	Dad	Children	Mom/Wife	Filming location
Season 1	Wang Zhong Lei 王中磊^{1}	Son - Wang Yuan Ye (William) 王元也; DOB: April 28, 2006	Wang Xiao Rong 王晓蓉	Beijing, China
Season 1	Wu Chun 吳尊^{2}	Daughter - Wu Xin Yi (Neinei) 吳欣怡; DOB: October 10, 2010	Lin Li Ying 林麗瑩^{3}	Bandar Seri Begawan, Brunei; Taipei, Taiwan^{4}

^Note 1: Wang Zhong Lei has an older daughter who does not appear on the show.
^Note 2: Wu Chun has a younger son born in late 2013 named Max that does not appear on the show, but he is often mentioned in conversations between Wu Chun and his daughter Nei Nei on the show.
^Note 3: Wu Chun's wife Lin Li Ying is the only mother/wife not to appear on the show but her voice can be heard on phone conversions between her, Wu Chun and Nei Nei.
^Note 4: Wu Chun and his family residence is in Brunei, but his work is based in Taipei, Taiwan.
^Note 5: Li Xiaopeng wife Angel, who was raised in the United States, can speak English and Chinese.

== Episodes ==
=== Season 1 (2014) ===
No. overall	No. in season	Title	Original release date
1	1	"Jia Nailiang Sacrifices To Bathe Daughter, Wu Chun Becomes A Chef For Daughter" (Chinese: 贾乃亮赤上身为女儿洗澡吴尊为女儿变厨神)	April 24, 2014
The dads introduces themselves and their child. Jia Nailiang tries to cheer up Tian Xin after she has separation anxiety after seeing her mom leave the house. Later he makes dumplings from scratch to cheer her up. Wu Chun brings Nei Nei grocery shopping, when they get back home he attempts to give her a shower and prepares lunch for the both of them. Wang Zhong Lei takes William with him to his work place, William quietly entertains himself in order not to disturb his dad at work. The two later head to a film set where William gets to meet Hong Kong superstar Andy Lau. Li Xiapeng attempts to cook for the first time for him and Olivia. The two later meet up with his friend Chinese Olympic swimming gold medalist Sun Yang. Guest stars: Chinese Olympic swimming gold medalist Sun Yang, Andy Lau
2	2	"Wu Chun Laws For Courting His Daughter, Andy Lau Is Broke" (Chinese: 吴尊公布追女儿法则 刘德华被爆料)	May 1, 2014
The dads and kids wake up to day two without mom. Wu Chun takes Nei Nei to school and hosts sports day at a local school. Nailiang successfully makes steam eggs for Tian Xin's breakfast after many tries. Later he takes Tian Xin to the national park where she slips and hits her head on the stone floor. Li Xiaopeng takes Olivia grocery shopping where she insist on buying snacks that dad does not approve of. At home Xiapeng disciplines Olivia for taking his cell phone. Zhong Lei takes William to his photo shoot, where William becomes fascinated seeing his dad made up for the first time. Later Jing Boran visits their hotel room to meet up with Zhong Lei. Guest stars: Jing Boran
3	3	"Calvin Coax To Get On Nei Nei's Good Side, Jia Nailiang Crying Daughter" (Chinese: 辰亦儒哄neinei反被嫌弃贾乃亮吓哭女儿)	May 8, 2014
Wu Chun dresses Nei Nei up in anticipation of his good friend and former band mate Calvin Chen's Brunei visit. Chun brings Calvin to the Burger King he owns. Jia Nailiang brings Tian Xin to his former alma mater, the Beijing Film Academy. Later he brings her to the seafood market. William convinces his dad to take him to a flea market to get him a pet, at the flea market he meets a foreigner and helps him translate with the shop keeper. Li Xiaopeng takes Olivia to his former gymnastic training grounds where Olivia shows potential as a gymnast. Former gymnast Liu Xuan pays a visit to Li Xiapeng and Olivia. Guest stars: Calvin Chen, Liu Xuan and her husband Wang Tao
4	4	"Jia Nailiang Couldn't Eve Complain, Wang Zhong Lei First Cooking Show" (Chinese: 贾乃亮连惹祸遭告状 王中磊厨艺首秀逆)	May 15, 2014
Jia Nailiang gives Tian Xin a hair wash that she ends up crying in pain when shampoo gets in her eyes, later he takes her to the doctors for a check up. Wu Chun takes Nei Nei to a learning center, he leaves her there while he takes Calvin to the airport to say goodbye. After picking up Nei Nei from the learning center they visit his cousin's home to bake cookies. Li Xiaopeng and Olivia make Easter eggs to surprise mom. Zhong Lei brings William to a basketball court where he shows off his skills to his son. William and his mom plan a birthday surprise for his dad. Guest stars: Calvin Chen
5	5	"William And Olivia Sweet Zoo Tour, First Time Wu Zhun Shows His Son" (Chinese: 奥莉威廉甜蜜同游动物园吴尊儿子曝光)	May 22, 2014
The Lis and the Wangs are at Hangzhou vacationing together. They head out to the Hangzhou Zoo to explore the animals. Wu Chun and Nei Nei head to Taipei for his work purposes. They go to an indoor play center where Wu Chun struggles to keep up with Nei Nei. Later they meet up with his friend Patty Hou. The entire Jia family go to an outdoor music fair where they meet up with their musician friends. After the music fair Jia Nailiang and Tian Xin head up to a mountain retreat to meet up with actor Wan Si-Wei and his family. Guest stars: Peng Tan, Chun Xiao, Patty Hou, Wan Si-Wei
6	6	"William And Olivia's Deep Bond, Jia Nailiang Have A Sweet Drowning" (Chinese: 奥莉威廉感情深厚贾乃亮甜馨纷纷落水)	May 29, 2014
The Lis and the Wangs are still in Hangzhou, they continue their zoo outing. They celebrate William's 8th birthday together; Hua Shao, host of his favorite show "The Voice of China", makes a surprise visit. Wu Chun and Nei Nei are still in Taipei, father and daughter have a photo shoot together. They meet up with Calvin again at the Miramar Entertainment Park, both men spoil Nei Nei with sweets when she's not supposed to have any. Later Chun and Nei Nei have dinner with his former agent and co-star Ah Ken. Jia Nailiang and Tian Xin are at a mountain retreat with his friend Wan Si-Wei. Guest stars: Calvin Chen, Ah Ken (Liu Jian Dong), Hua Shao host of "The Voice of China"
7	7	"Wu Chun Meets Up With Hei Ren For A Sweet Basketball Game, Jia Nailiang's Dad" (Chinese: 吴尊探班黑人甜馨江边钓鱼嘲弄乃爸)	June 5, 2014
Wang Zhong Lei takes William to the rural parts of Mangshi to experience country life, and is proud when William dives into the dirty work of rural farming and chores without any complaints. Li Xiaopeng and Olivia go to Hunan to visit his parents. There she meets a younger child and takes great care of him. Jia Nailiang and Tian Xin go to Harbin to visit his parents, after exploring the city together they go ice fishing. Wu Chun brings Nei Nei to his photo shoot and ask the hair stylist to give Nei Nei a haircut inspired by a Yoshitomo Nara illustration (that was also the inspiration for Choo Sarang's haircut in KBS's The Return of Superman). Later he brings Nei Nei to his friend Blackie Chen's cafe where they meet up with Jason Tang and his daughters. Guest stars: Blackie Chen, Jason Tang Zhi-Zhong with daughters Mei Mei & Xiang Xiang
8	8	"Olivia's Dirty Diaper Pant, Jia Nailiang Shark Diving Adventure" (Chinese: 奥莉拉裤子忐忑不安贾乃亮冒险潜水捡鲨鱼牙齿)	June 13, 2014
Wang Zhong Lei and William continue their journey in Mangshi's rural countryside. William attends the local school and helps the teacher teach the local students the English alphabet. Both Olivia and Tian Xin are still having fun at their grandparents' hometown. Jia Nailiang and Tian Xin has an adventurous day with grandma at a safari zoo and aquarium. Li Xiaopeng and Olivia have a beautiful day with her grandparents enjoying nature at a forest park. Wu Chun takes Nei Nei on the rail train to Taiwan's Yilan County, where they go to a vegetable farm and help plant vegetables. Later the two go to a crayon factory to have fun making their own color markers and crayons. Guest stars:
9	9	"Jia Nailiang And Li Xiaolu Heart To Heart, Li Xiapeng Standards" (Chinese: 贾乃亮自曝追李小璐经过李小鹏爆选婿标准)	June 20, 2014
The Jias and the Lis go on a beach adventure together. Wu Chun and Nei Nei are in Hangzhou; they head explore a natural animal habitat and a children's play center. Wang Zhong Lei and William meet up with Lin Yi-Lun, they head to the market first then to the Wang home to cook a meal. Guest stars: Allen Lin Yi-Lun
10	10	"Jia Nailiang And Li Xiaolu Sweet Kiss" (Chinese: 辣妈团突袭贾乃亮吻李小璐遭甜馨扯发)	June 27, 2014
The Jias and the Lis heads to an obstacle course adventurer together. Wu Chun and Nei Nei are still in Hangzhou, they go loquat picking. Father and daughter later encounter super star treatment. Wang Zhong Lei attempts to cook a full course meal for William.
11	11	"The Four Family Gather" (Chinese: 四家首度齊聚)	July 3, 2014
12	12	"Dad Is Back Season 1 Perfect Ending" (Chinese: 爸爸回來了第一季完美收官)	July 10, 2014

=== Season 2 (2015) ===
No. overall	No. in season	Title	Original release date
13	1	"A New Beginning, The Kids Grow Up 新一期開始寶貝們長大了"	May 9, 2015
New season of Dad Is Back. Some returning families and some new families.
14	2	"Olivia's Afraid Of a Cute Dog's Barking, Brother Dong To The Rescue" (Chinese: 甜馨嚇退咆哮狗 奧莉壁咚哥哥安慰別氣)	May 16, 2015
15	3	"Jia Nailiang Monkeys Around, William Returns To Visit Olivia" (Chinese: 甜馨嫌棄乃爸扮唐僧 威廉回歸餵食奧莉)	May 23, 2015
16	4	"Du Yuqi Sweetly Call Li Chen Dad By Accident" (Chinese: 嗯哼喊李晨爸爸看呆杜江 甜馨直呼乃爸亮哥)	May 30, 2015

== Sponsors ==
HaoCaiTou is the main sponsor of the show. Their Xiao Yang yogurt drink product logo is intertwined on the top right of the shows logo. The product and logo is prominently displayed throughout each episode. Also the kids on the show are seen consuming the product.

- HaoCaiTou Xiao Yang yogurt drink
- Baojun 610 car
- LUOLAI HOME TEXTILE CO., LTD.
- ABC Kids 因为爱
- OSM skincare
- weibo.com
- LeTV.com

== Controversies ==
- Wu Chun and his daughter Nei Nei participation on the show was highly anticipated by audiences as viewers wanted to see how Nei Nei looked since Wu Chun had controversially admitted to being married and father of a child in October 2013 after years of denying he had a wife and daughter.
- Viewers were appalled by Nei Nei's shower scene in episode 1. They questioned Wu Chun's parenting methods, complaining how he could strip his daughter naked in front of a camera crew since she was no longer considered a toddler.
- Viewers were shocked by Jia Nailiang and his daughter Tian Xin taking a bath together. They complained about the scene that happened in episode 1 where Jia Nailiang, wearing skimpy shorts climbed into a bathtub together with his fully nude 1-year-old daughter to take a bubble bath together.

== See also ==
The Return of Superman (TV series)
