= Pai Bing-bing =

Taiwanese actress and singer

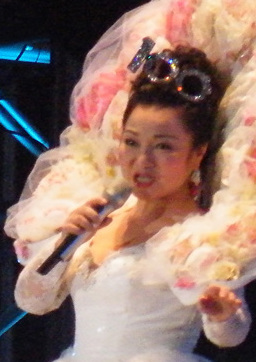
- Pai in 2010
- Born: Pai Yueh-o (白月娥); 17 May 1955 (age 71); Keelung, Taiwan
- Occupations: Singer, actress, media personality, social activist
- Years active: 1973–present
- Spouse: Ikki Kajiwara (m. 1978; div. 1981)
- Children: Pai Hsiao-yen

Chinese name
- Chinese: 白冰冰
Transcriptions
Standard Mandarin
- Hanyu Pinyin: Bái Bīngbīng
- Wade–Giles: Pai Ping-ping

Pai Yueh-o
- Chinese: 白月娥
Transcriptions
Standard Mandarin
- Hanyu Pinyin: Bái Yuèé
- Wade–Giles: Pai Yüeh-o

Pai Hsueh-hua
- Traditional Chinese: 白雪嬅
Transcriptions
Standard Mandarin
- Hanyu Pinyin: Bái Xuěhuá
- Wade–Giles: Pai Hsüeh-hua

Pai Hsueh-hua (born 17 May 1955), born Pai Yueh-o, better known by her stage name Pai Bing-bing (also spelled Pai Ping-ping), is a Taiwanese singer, actress, media personality and social activist.

== Early life ==
Born to an impoverished family in Keelung, Pai dropped out of formal education in her teenage years.

== Career ==
In 1973, she won a prize in a singing contest held by Taiwan Television and following this success she pursued a career in the local entertainment business. Since mid-1980s, Pai gained popularity for her bantering style, becoming one of the best-known Taiwanese entertainers. Richard Lloyd-Parry of The Independent described Pai as the "Cilla Black of Taiwan".

Besides her entertainment career, Pai also had significant investments in local catering service industry.

== Personal life and social activism ==
In 1975, she moved to Japan to study singing and acting. At this time she had a relationship with Japanese comics writer Ikki Kajiwara and they later married. Their daughter Pai Hsiao-yen was born in 1980 but their marriage was quickly dissolved the next year after Kajiwara engaged in an extramarital affair and committed domestic violence. Pai Bing-bing had to return to Taiwan and raised Hsiao-yen as a single mother. In 1997, Hsiao-yen, 16 year old at the time, was kidnapped, raped, tortured and murdered. This event made the elder Pai into a social activist advocating the use of death penalty; Pai founded the Swallow Foundation and chaired it to date to advocate capital punishment as well as provide legal support to local crime victims. Lloyd-Parry described the attention around the murder of Pai's daughter as giving Pai "a greater, though more terrible, fame than she had as an entertainer." In 2010, in the wake of the global anti-capital punishment movement, Pai successfully held a protest against then-Minister of Justice Wang Ching-feng, resulting in Wang's resignation and the resumption of executions in Taiwan.

Pai has a four-storey property in Linkou District.

== Filmography ==
=== Film ===
Year	English title	Original title	Role	Notes	Ref.
1978	Karate Wars	カラテ大戦争	Chen Ling-lan		
1983	Chinese Magic	中國法術			
1990	The Hilarious Army	大笑兵團			
1990	Ghost Married	鬼出嫁	Hua		
1990	Seventh Moon	七月鬼門開	Bing-bing		
1992	Kung-Fu Kids	沒大沒小	Nanny Gu		
1994	Lonely Hearts Club	寂寞芳心俱樂部	Chen Chunnu		
1997	Yours and Mine	我的神經病			
2010	Comedy Makes You Cry	拍賣春天	Lingling		
2016	Like Life	人生按個讚	Hsu Chuan-chen	also co-writer, supervising producer	

=== Television series ===
Year	English title	Chinese title	Role	Notes	Ref.
1994	The Seven Heroes and Five Gallants	七俠五義	Gu Atao		
2006	Emerald on the Roof	屋顶上的绿宝石	Fang Min		
2007	Love at First Fight	武十郎	Lei Laohu		
2007	I Shall Succeed	我一定要成功	Chen Suchun		
