= Moon Man (2022 film) =

- Theatrical release poster
- Traditional Chinese: 獨行月球
- Simplified Chinese: 独行月球
- Hanyu Pinyin: Dúxíng Yuèqiú
- Directed by: Zhang Chiyu
- Written by: Zhang Chiyu; Qian Chenguang; Dai Si'ao; Shen Yuyue
- Based on: Moon You by Cho Seok
- Produced by: Liu Hongtao; Li Zhang
- Starring: Shen Teng; Ma Li
- Cinematography: Du Jie
- Edited by: Tu Yiran
- Music by: Peng Fei
- Production companies: Mahua FunAge; China Film Co., Ltd. Alibaba Pictures; Shanghai Ruyi Film and Television Production Co., Ltd. Tianjin Maoyan Weiying Culture Media; Xihongshi Film and Television Culture (Tianjin) Co., Ltd.
- Distributed by: Mahua FunAge
- Release date: 29 July 2022
- Running time: 122 minutes
- Country: China
- Language: Mandarin
- Box office: $460.3 million

Moon Man (Chinese: 独行月球) is a 2022 Chinese science fiction comedy film co-written and directed by Zhang Chiyu, and starring Shen Teng and Ma Li. The film is an adaptation of South Korean illustrator Cho Seok's webcomic series Moon You. It tells the story of "the last human in the universe" as a taikonaut finds himself stranded on the Moon after an asteroid seems to wipe out life on Earth.

The film premiered in China on 29 July 2022 and grossed over $460 million worldwide. Released in South Korea on January 11, 2023.

Three days after the film was released, the box office exceeded 1 billion yuan, becoming the 98th billion-yuan film in Chinese film history.

== Plot ==
Dugu Yue, a former flight dynamics engineer, is hired as a maintenance man for Project United Nations Moon Shield (UNMS), an operation spearheaded by the Chinese government which is intended to protect the Earth from an incoming asteroid named "π". The plan is to deploy a group of new super missiles, called the Cosmic Strike Hammers, to shatter the asteroid and then use the Moon to shield Earth from its fragments. Eight years after their launch, the Cosmic Strike Hammers successfully shatter "π"; but one of the missiles was thrown off course by a solar storm, leaving some of the asteroid fragments heading towards the UNMS Moon station. The facility is hastily evacuated, and in the chaos Yue is accidentally left behind. Arriving too late to board the last evacuation rocket, he witnesses one major fragment striking Earth, seemingly wiping out all of humanity.

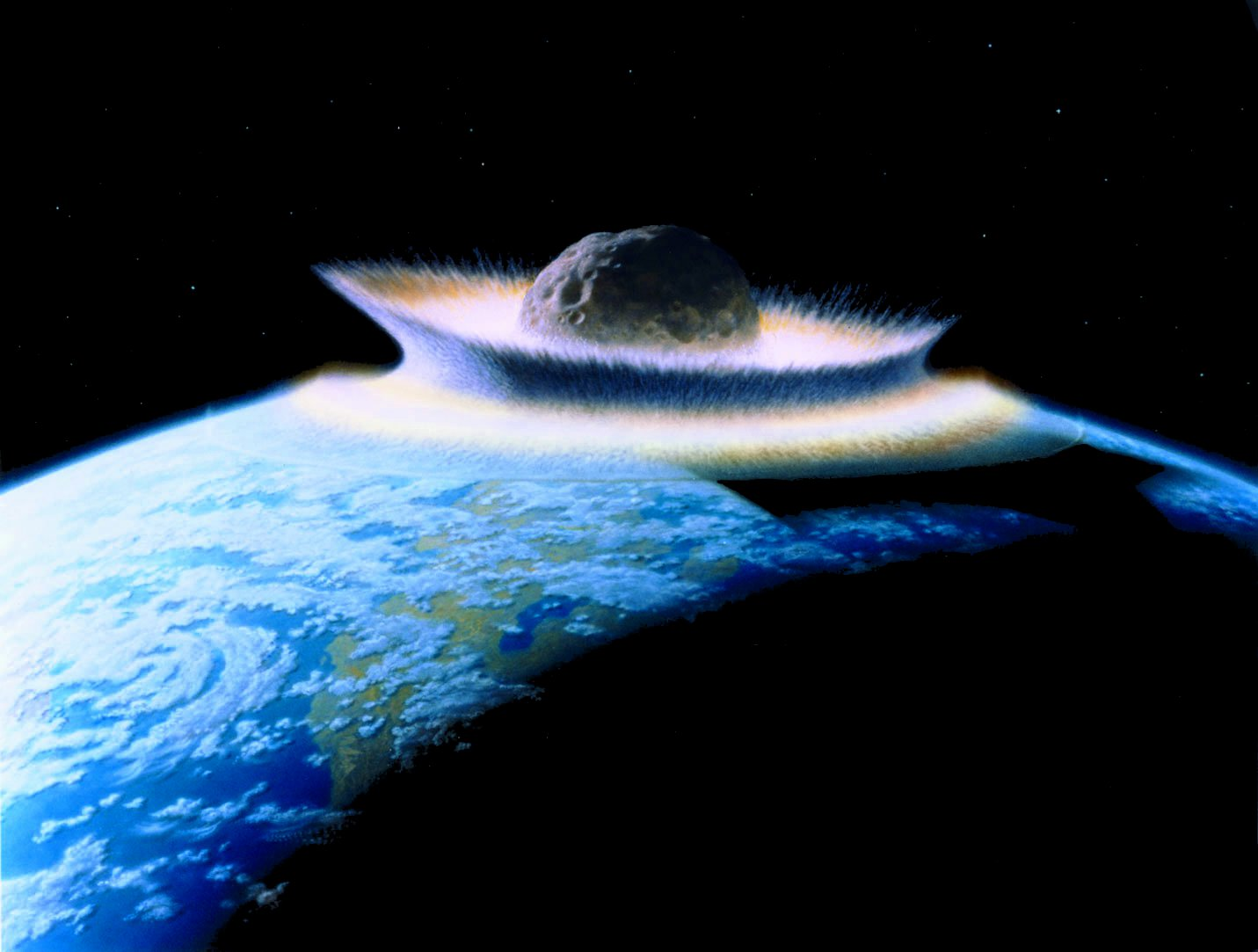
NASA artist depiction of an asteroid impacting Earth

Considering himself the only human being left, Yue spends his time living out his unrequited crush on Ma Lanxing, his base commander, not suspecting that some UNMS operators, including Lanxing herself, have been watching him through the station's video surveillance feed. A portion of humanity has survived the disaster in pre-built underground bunkers, but Earth's situation is rendered desperate by a global dust cloud blocking off the Sun's radiation. UNMS chairman Sun Guangyang urges to establish a public livestream link to the station in order to portray Yue as a role model and thus raise hope among the surviving population. Because the audio links to the station have been severed, it is decided to add overdubbing and outside narration.

Yue discovers that he has company in the form of a temperamental red kangaroo named "King Kong Roo", left behind by the UNMS research division. Thus, the UNMS' first attempts to portray Yue as a survivalist go comically wrong as the two begin fighting over the station's food stores. During a brief lull, Yue notices some static sounds which leads him to believe that some people on Earth are still alive. He decides to reach some equipment left over from an 18th, abandoned Apollo mission to reach the UNMS space station in the Moon's orbit and use an escape capsule to return to Earth. Yue begins repairing the lunar lander, but to initiate liftoff, he needs the first Strike Hammer prototype, which is stored in another station at Lacus Perseverantiae.

Yue and Kong begin a journey on a solar-powered rover to obtain the prototype, and after several mishaps on the way, they make it back to the station. Yue discovers the static sounds were caused by Kong's accidental meddling, making him believe that he has apparently been living on false hopes. Despairing, he abandons his efforts, but Lanxing calls upon humanity's survivors to send him a combined light signal, thus telling him that he is not alone.

With his confidence renewed, Yue establishes full audio-visual contact with Earth's UNMS headquarters, who help him in coordinating his repair efforts. In a private moment, Yue confesses to Lanxing that she was the sole reason for him to be hired on the UNMS mission, and a deeply touched Lanxing apologizes for leaving him behind. Yue finally completes the liftoff module and reaches the lunar space station, but just then the UNMS learns that another major fragment of "π", designated "π+", is on a collision course with Earth, threatening to completely annihilate all life on the planet. Overhearing the news, Yue volunteers to guide his lander towards "π+" so that the Strike Hammer's warhead can destroy it, but on his way there he hits leftover debris from "π", which disables the missile's engine. Knowing he is humanity's last hope, he heroically sacrifices himself by personally directing the warhead using his spacesuit's thrusters, destroying "π+".

Over ten years later, after the dust around the globe has cleared away naturally, human civilization has rebuilt itself and even started advancing beyond its pre-impact levels. Lanxing returns to the Moon station, where she imagines being joined by Yue's spirit to watch the remains of "π+" settling in a stable orbit around the Earth as a planetary ring.

== Cast ==
- Shen Teng as Dugu Yue
- Ma Li as Ma Lanxing
- Chang Yuan as Zhu Pite
- Li Chengru as Sun Guangyang
- Huang Cailun as Hulusi
- Lamu Yangzi as Wei Lasi
- Hao Han as King Kong Roo, a red kangaroo
- Huang Zitao as an actor

== Soundtrack ==
No.	Title	Lyrics	Music	Singer(s)	Length
1.	"Tell You Softly (轻轻地告诉你)" (Promotional song)	Bi Xiaoshi	Bi Xiaoshi	Shen Teng/ Ma Li	251 seconds
2.	"The Love You Left Behind (你留下的爱)" (Opening theme)	Li Cong	Peng Fei	Coco Lee
3.	"Moon Doesn't Go, I Have To Go (月亮不走我得走)" (Ending theme)	Wang Yaoguang	Jin Zhiwen	Jin Zhiwen	220 seconds
4.	"I Don't Feel Good Lately (最近比较烦)" (Interlude)	Jonathan Lee	Jonathan Lee/ Wakin Chau/ Pin Guang	Shen Teng/ Ma Li/ Chang Yuan/ Huang Cailun

== Release ==
Moon Man was released on 29 July 2022, in China.

=== Reception ===
Douban, a major Chinese media rating site, gave the drama 6.8 out of 10. Review aggregator Rotten Tomatoes listed three reviews of the film, all of which are positive. Particular praise came from reviewer Carla Hay who says that the film "takes some familiar elements of “stranded survivor” stories and delivers a unique spin that people of many different generations can enjoy."

=== Box office ===
Moon Man grossed a total of $460.3 million at the Chinese box office. On its opening weekend, the film grossed $147.93 million, making it the highest-grossing opening weekend in China since The Battle at Lake Changjin II. By August 3, the film passed $200 million at the box office. The film dropped 54.6% in its second weekend, and passed $300 million by August 8. On August 19, the film dropped from the number one spot at the box office after 22 days, being beat by New Gods: Yang Jian. On August 22, the film passed $400 million.As of 23:59 on October 29, 2022, the final box office of "Walking on the Moon" was 3.103 billion, breaking a total of 17 film history records.

It was the eleventh-highest-grossing film of 2022, earning $460.3 million.

=== Behind-the-scenes ===
The film official revealed that the subtitle "The universe is so big, we will meet again" at the end of the film was added at the initiative of Shen Teng

Director Zhang Chiyu said that actor Hao Han spent a year studying the habits of kangaroos in order to play the role well. During the filming process, he mostly followed Hao Han's opinions on how to display kangaroos.
