= George Hu =

American-born actor and singer (born 1982)

- Born: July 24, 1982 (age 44); New York City, U.S.
- Other name: Hu Yu-wei
- Education: St. John's University (BS)
- Occupations: Actor; singer
- Years active: 2006–present
- Spouse: Annie Chen
- Children: 1 daughter
- Musical career
- Genre: Mandopop
- Formerly of: Wu Hu Jiang

Chinese name
- Traditional Chinese: 胡宇威
- Simplified Chinese: 胡宇威
- Hanyu Pinyin: Hú Yǔwēi

George Hu (Chinese: 胡宇威; pinyin: Hú Yǔwēi; born 24 July 1982) is a Taiwanese-American actor, singer and martial artist based in Taiwan. He speaks fluent English, Mandarin and Taiwanese Hokkien. Since 2011, he has been signed to Yang Deng-kui's management company Polyland International Entertainment.

== Early life and education ==
George Hu was born in New York City on 24 July 1982, to Taiwanese American parents. He is the eldest of two children; his sister is two years younger and his parents reside in New York. When he was seven, he began training in Chinese martial arts. His mother who had martial arts training herself was a huge influence on him learning martial arts. He studied under Master Marlon Ma at NY Wutang Chinese Martial Arts Institute where he learned the fighting style of the long fist, praying mantis, and baji. He participated in several martial arts competitions in the US and has won several competitions such as 1995 S. Henry Cho America Open, Shi Fu Yang Shu-Ton Martial Arts Association of Ohio Chinese Martial Arts Tournament, Huang Chien Liang U.S.C.K.F, and Wushu Kung Fu Federation. When he was 17, he was appointed as an instructor at Wutang.

Hu attended St. John's University in Queens, New York, and graduated in 2004 with a bachelor's degree in computer design. While visiting family and friends in Taiwan after graduating from college he was scouted and asked to audition for a talent agency.

== Acting career ==
=== 2005: Move to Taiwan and learning Chinese ===
In March 2005 he signed under Yang Dengkui's First Media Holdings Corporation and moved to Taiwan to pursue a career in acting. He lived at his uncle's house and shared a bedroom with his cousin when he first moved to Taiwan. As he was unfamiliar with the Chinese language, could only speak a few words and couldn't read or write Chinese, he spent his entire first year in Taiwan learning basic Chinese and memorizing the lines to his first drama Emerald on the Roof.

=== 2006–2007: Acting debut ===
In 2006 he made his acting debut as the second male lead alongside Wallace Huo in the idol drama Emerald on the Roof. As his Chinese pronunciation wasn't fluent his voice was dubbed by a voice actor in the drama. His next drama in 2007, a pre-war China comedy, romance, and action drama Love at First Fight starred mostly the same cast from Emerald on the Roof with the addition of Hong Kong actress/singer Miriam Yeung as the female lead. His voice was once again dubbed in both Mandarin and Cantonese for this drama.

=== 2007–2009: Collaboration with "Fahrenheit" members ===
In late 2007 he moved to more mainstream idol drama Romantic Princess playing Taiwanese boyband Fahrenheit members Wu Chun and Calvin Chen. This is the first drama his real voice can be heard. That same year he also had a minimal role in the second installment of popular Taiwanese idol K.O. drama franchise The X-Family starring alongside the rest of the other Fahrenheit members. In early 2008 he once again played Wu Chun's younger brother in a supporting role for the idol drama Hot Shot working alongside popular Taiwanese idols Jerry Yan and Show Luo. In the summer of 2008, he starred alongside Rainie Yang and Jiro Wang from Fahrenheit in the idol drama ToGetHer as Jia Sen aka Ah Gan. The drama was aired in early 2009. For this role he had to play a 20-year-old college student and swimming captain with the mind of an 8-year-old boy, and he also had to train his body to resemble a championship swimmer.

=== 2009–2010: First leading role and music career ===
In early 2009 till early 2010 he starred in his first leading role for the 3rd installment of the K.O. drama franchise K.O.3an Guo as a modern version of Chinese historical general Guan Yu. The drama was filmed as it aired. During the beginning filming period of K.O.3an Guo he was involved in a traffic accident while on his way to the film set. His left leg was injured, and he relied on crutches or a wheelchair to get around for three months. Because of his injury he was not able to perform much of his martial arts stunts for the early episodes of the drama. Also due to the popularity of the drama he and his co-stars later formed a five-member boy band called "Wu Hu Jiang" or "Tiger Team" in English.

=== 2010–2011: Difficult times and change of management ===
His band "Wu Hu Jiang" ceased activity due to restructuring of their management company and he received little to no filming offers. His only work during this period was in a minor role for the idol drama "Me & My Brothers". Due to the minimal work offers he received during this time his father had said to him that if he wanted to quit show business and return to New York it will be fine with his family, but he persisted and signed with Yang Dengkui's new management company Polyland International Entertainment in 2011. His first role under Polyland's management was as the lead in 2011's Hayate the Combat Butler based on the popular Japanese manga of the same name, with Korean actress Park Shin-hye as the female lead.

=== 2012–2013: Turning point and popularity rising ===
The turning point in his career came in late 2012 starring as the male lead alongside Annie Chen as the female lead in SETTV's romance drama Love, Now. In an interview for LETV he stated that he had accepted the project during the early stages of development and without even knowing the story line or seeing a script to the project in order to re-establish his presence in Taiwan since he had been filming dramas in Mainland China for the past year. He received a lot of notice for his role as Lan Shi-da a cold but caring business family man. His pairing with Annie Chen was so well received that SETTV decided to pair them up again as a couple less than three months after Love, Now ended in 2013's Love Around.

His fame continued to rise in late 2013 after starring in the joint mainland China and Taiwan historical drama Lan Ling Wang as the lead character's younger half-brother An De Wang. His voice was dubbed for his mainland China dramas since he still had a foreigner accent when speaking Chinese Mandarin. His popularity in Taiwan also continued to rise after his second successful collaboration with Annie Chen in the drama Love Around.

=== 2014–present: Film debut ===
After production of "Love Around" ended Hu took a few months off from acting, only focusing on advertisement work and to prep for his film debut. In March 2014 Hu began filming in Mainland China for his film debut, Where the Wind Settles, a film about China during the World War II wartime period. The latter half of the movie was filmed in Taiwan depicting early Kuomintang rule in Taiwan. Hu played a Chinese soldier who fled to Taiwan after the Communist party took over China. To prep for the role, he had to go through a strict diet in order to lose over 10 pounds from his regular weight of 70 kg (155Lbs).

After Where the Wind Settles finished filming in mid 2014, Hu accepted the lead to star in SETTV's weekly drama Love Cheque Charge, a romantic fantasy comedy about a man who is haunted by the ghost of the man he was asked to deliver a message to his girlfriend before he died.

== Music career ==
=== 2009–2011: Wu Hu Jiang ===
In 2009 due to the popularity of K.O.3an Guo, George, alongside co-stars Benji, Bo Yan, Shao Xiang and Si Wei Hong Zheng, were formed into a five-member boy band called "Wu Hu Jiang" (武虎將 / Tiger Team). The leader of the group was Benji with George as the spokesperson for the group. The group received moderate success and won the Best New Artist Award at Channel V's 14th Annual Global Chinese Chart and Asian Influence awards. Due to the members busy schedules with individual projects and restructuring of their agency the group's activities as a band ceased sometime in 2011 and officially disbanded in 2013. The group has never officially released an album.

=== 2014–present: Solo album ===
In 2014 Hu signed with music company More! Entertainment Music for his self-titled debut album. The album was published by Sony Music Taiwan. The first single from his album is Do Not Say Good Bye (別說Good Bye). The music video for Do Not Say Good Bye (別說Good Bye) starred his good friend and former Hayate the Combat Butler co-star Tia Lee.

== Personal life ==
=== Injuries ===
On January 14, 2009, while on his way to the film set of K.O.3an Guo he was injured in a car accident when a taxi after running a yellow traffic light collided with his motorbike. He described the accident as being in the movie The Matrix after he was thrown from his bike and landed on the ground heavily. He received minor cuts and grazes on his legs and suffered a fractured left shin. For a month he depended on crutches and a wheelchair for movement. Surgery was not needed, and he recovered with no further complications.

During the summer of 2011 his right lower front leg suffered a minor gash while filming a bike paddling scene for the drama "Summer Fever". The wound left a scar on his right front lower leg that is still visible in his later works when not covered with makeup.

In 2013 while filming the constant baseball batting cage scenes in Love Around Hu sustained a back injury. It was last reported that he had been seeking treatment for over two months and was also going through acupuncture sessions to try to heal his injury.

In October 2015, Hu suffered multiple injures while training for a film project. While training with heavy vehicle equipment, Hu suffered four broken ribs, a dislocated shoulder, a torn ligament in his right shoulder and showed signs of a collapsed lung. He was rushed to a hospital near the Pingxi district.

In January 2022, Hu and actress Annie Chen announced their engagement on Instagram. The couple had worked together on the 2012 television series Love, Now and the 2013 drama Love Around. They married in the United States in July 2023.

== Filmography ==
=== Television series ===
Year	English title	Original title	Role	Network
2006	Emerald on the Roof	屋頂上的綠寶石	Nie Kai	GTV
2007	Love at First Fight	武十郎	Lei Sheng Da	FTV
2007	Romantic Princess	公主小妹	Nan Feng Lin	CTV
2007	The X-Family	終極一家	Shen Xing Zhe / Qiang Ling Wang	GTV
2008	Hot Shot	籃球火	Wu Ji Wei	CTV
2009	ToGetHer	愛就宅一起	Wei Jia Sen	CTV
2009	K.O.3an Guo	終極三國	Guan Yu	FTV/GTV
2010	I, My Brother	我和我的兄弟~恩	Dennis	Astro
2011	Hayate the Combat Butler	旋風管家	Ling Qisa / Hayate Ayazaki	FTV
2011	Rookies Diary Season 2	新兵日記之特戰英雄	Zheng Qiang	FTV
2012	Summer Fever	戀夏38°C	Lin Ming Kuan	CTV
2012–2013	Love, Now	真愛趁現在	Lan Shi De	SETTV
2013	Love Around	真愛黑白配	Zhou Zhen	TTV
2013	Xin Shen Tan Lian Meng	新神探联盟	Zhan Chao	CCTV
2013	Prince of Lan Ling	蘭陵王	An De Wang	JZTV
2014	For The Love Of Travel	為愛旅行	Li Zhen Kai	PTS
2014	Love Cheque Charge	幸福兌換券	He Bu Fan	SETTV
2016	Happiness Meets Rainbow	幸福又見彩虹	Du Van	CUTV/Tencent
	Girls Lies	戀人的謊言	Yu Qi Ran	
2017	Lightning	進擊吧，閃電	Deng Erhao	Hunan TV
2017	Art In Love	那刻的怦然心動	Tao Yu Fei	MG TV
2020	Wait in Beijing	我在北京等你	Shan Kai	JSTV/ZJSTV
2020	Wacko at Law	王牌辯護人	Mai Da Qi	EBC TV
2024	Game On	遊戲開始	Professor Bu	TVBS

=== Film ===
Year	English title	Original title	Role	Notes
2013	Cloudy with a Chance of Meatballs 2	—N/a	Flint Lockwood	Taiwanese release, voice
2015	Where the Wind Settles	風中家族	Fan Chung-yueh	
2019	Han Dan	寒單	Lin Zheng Kun	
2019	Sunshine in Norway	陽光傾城		

=== Hosting ===
==== Award ceremonies ====
Year	Title	Notes
2015	The 3rd Annual DramaFever Awards	with Arden Cho

=== Music video appearances ===
Year	Artist	Song title
2007	Sara	"So I Love You"
2008	Rainie Yang	"Cold War"
2009	Nylon Chen	"24 Hour Madness"
2010	Chyi Chin	"Like Crazy"
2011	Thomas Jack	"Buddy"
2011	William Wei	"Do Not Ask Me"
2012	Emma Wu	"The Flavour Of Summer"
2019	Della Wu	"Unlike Us"

== Discography ==
#	English title	Mandarin title	Released	Label
1st	George Hu	胡宇威	14 October 2014	Sony Music Taiwan
2nd	Do Not Disturb	請不要打擾	21 July 2017	Seed Music

== Published works ==
George Hu - GEO Photobook
- Author: George Hu 胡宇威
- Genre: photobook, biography
- Published: 2013 Shui-Ling Culture & Books 水靈文創
- Publication place: Taiwan
- Media type: Print hardback
- Pages: 152
- ISBN: 9789868999411

- 15 October 2013: George Hu - GEO Photobook (胡宇威‧GEO 同名精裝寫真) - ISBN 9789868999411

Shot by star photographer Zeng Jing Fu and styled by internationally renowned stylist Liu Da Jiang, George's self-titled 152-page photobook briefly details his struggles and early days in Taiwan to his current rise in the Asian entertainment circle.

- 30 September 2013: Love Around Official Photobook (真愛黑白配 寫真書) - barcode 4717095572034
- 15 August 2013: Lanling Wang Photobook (蘭陵王影像書) - ISBN 9789868901087
- 25 June 2011: Hayate the Combat Butler Photo Essay (旋風管家 首本官方寫真書) - ISBN 9862872349
- 10 September 2009: I Love Wu Hu Jiang (我愛武虎將) - ISBN 9789862372548
- 17 February 2009: ToGetHer Photobook (愛就宅一起甜蜜寫真) - ISBN 9789578037236
- 20 September 2007: Romantic Princess Photobook (公主小妹 幕後寫真) - ISBN 9789575657932
