= Ma Li (actress) =

Chinese actress

- 马丽
- Born: 28 June 1982 (age 44); Kuandian Manchu Autonomous County, Liaoning, China
- Education: Central Academy of Drama
- Occupation: Actress
- Years active: 2003–present
- Political party: Chinese Communist Party

Chinese name
- Simplified Chinese: 马丽
- Traditional Chinese: 馬麗
Transcriptions
Standard Mandarin
- Hanyu Pinyin: Mǎ Lì

Ma Li (Chinese: 马丽; born 28 June 1982) is a Chinese actress best known for her role in Goodbye Mr. Loser and Never Say Die.

== Biography ==
Ma was born in Kuandian Manchu Autonomous County, Liaoning on 28 June 1982. Her parents divorced since her childhood. In 1996, with the support of her stepfather, she entered Liaoning Culture and Arts School to study performance. In 2001, she enrolled at the Central Academy of Drama, majored in acting.

In 2005, Shen Teng came to the small theater to watch a performance, and Ma appeared in the play The City is Full of Pyramids (满城全是金字塔). Ma's performance left a deep impression on him. A month later, Shen directed the drama Crazy Stone (疯狂的石头). Due to unforeseen circumstances, an actor suddenly could not attend, so Shen invited her to join the crew. Since then, she became a member of the comedy team of Happy Mahua Stage.

Between 2009 and 2012, she gradually became a well-known actor of Happy Mahua by starring in the plays Jianghu Academy, The Earl of Oolong Mountain and Goodbye Mr. Loser.

In 2013, Ma Li participated in the CCTV Spring Festival Gala for the first time, and cooperated with Shen Teng in the skit "Today's Happiness 2", playing the role of Ma Dongmei.

In 2014, Ma Li and Shen Teng second cooperation Spring Festival Gala sketch "help or not help", the sketch aired, harvested that year's most popular language program first place.

On September 30, 2015, the youthful romantic comedy film Goodbye Mr. Loser, led by Ma Li, was released, in which she played Ma Dongmei.

On October 20, 2016, she won the Most Stylish Actress of the Year Award at the Netease Fashion Crossover Ceremony.

On September 30, 2017, the movie Never Say Die Ma Li was broadcast, interpreting the role of sports reporter Ma Xiao, and won the Best Actress Award at the Golden Dragon Awards of the Ninth International Chinese Film Festival for the film .

In August 2019 Forbes Releases China 100 Celebrities List, MaLi Ranks 59th.

In 2022, Ma Li led the starring roles in Too Cool to Kill, and Moon Man debut on the screen, and thus become the highest box office actress in Chinese movie history; in the same year, with the Beyond won the 31st China Television Golden Eagle Award for Best Supporting Actress.

At 14:25 on February 16, 2024, Ma Li became the first actress to star in a movie that grossed 18.1 billion yuan at the box office, helping Ma Li sit as the highest grossing actress in Chinese movie history.

On 16 July 2024, Ma Li tarred in the film Catching Dolls, which was released nationwide, as Chunlan On August 3, according to Cat's Eye Professional, the movie Catching Dolls starring actress Ma Li is in theatres, and the box office has exceeded 2.5 billion yuan, making the cumulative box office of Ma Li's starring movies reach 22.059 billion yuan, which is ranked fourth on the box office list of movies starring moviemakers in China's film history.

On 15 September 2024, the featured film One Snow Shame was released.

== Lifetime Experience ==
Ma showed a talent for acting from a young age, and with the support of her stepfather, she took the road to acting.

Between 1996 and 1999, Ma Li studied at the Liaoning Culture and Art School.

Ma Li successively studied in Liaoning Culture and Art School, Liaoning Culture and Art Workers' University, Department of Acting; in 2001, she was admitted to the Central Academy of Drama, Department of Acting, and in 2004, after graduation, Ma Li entered the Peking University Theatre Research Institute, Lin Zhaohua Theatre Workshop.

== Personal life ==
In January 2017, MaLi went public with her relationship with actor Xu Wenhe.

On 1 December 2019, Mali officially announced the happy news of her pregnancy via Weibo.

== Performing Arts Experience ==
In 2003, while in school, Ma Li appeared in the play Annie's Diary directed by Ji Pei, a female director at the Central Academy of Drama, in which she played the role of Mip.

In 2009, she starred in the stage play Jianghu Academy with Bao Beier, playing the role of gold-digging girl "Zhuang Chun", which has received a large number of audience since its performance, and has been hailed as "the most sought-after stage play of the year".

In 2010, Ma Li and Shen Teng collaborated for the first time on the play Goodbye Mr. Loser and since then they have become golden partners on the stage.

On November 28, 2012, Ma Li starred in the new Happy Mahua New Year's Eve drama The Trouble with Charlotte, which tells the story of an ordinary person who travels back to high school and realizes all kinds of dreams of an incredible experience.

== Screen Experience ==
In 2009, the Queen of Drama Ma Li was recognized by the film company for her performance in a drama, and started to enter the screen in full scale.

In 2010, Ma Li starred in her first movie, Welcome to Shama Town.

In 2014, Happy Mahua planned to make a movie version of The Trouble with Charlotte, with Ma Li as the movie's leading lady. Once the movie was aired, it got 1.46 billion box office as the dark horse of the year.

On 20 October 2016, she won the Most Stylish Actress of the Year Award at the Netease Fashion Crossover Ceremony.

On September 30, 2017, partner Allen, Shen Teng starred in the movie Never Say Die was released in the film, played in the film and male boxers swap souls of the sports reporter Ma Xiao, the final box office exceeded 2.2 billion; since then, Ma Li successfully promoted to the "double 1 billion movie heroine". In November of the same year, as the fourth Silk Road International Film Festival "promotional ambassador"; December 28, Ma Li won the Tencent white paper "annual film star".

Between 2020 and 2022, she has twice acted in the series of tribute films My Motherland and I and My Hometown and I.

In 2022, Ma Li starred in Too Cool to Kill and Moon Man. She was nominated for Best Actress at the 33rd Huading Awards for her portrayal of actress "Milan" in the movie" Too Cool to Kill.

January 2023, starred in the microfilm Me and My Spring Festival.

On January 13, 2024, Ma Li was awarded "Weibo Outstanding Actor of the Year" at Weibo Night 2023.

== Filmography ==
=== Film ===
Year	English title	Chinese title	Role	Ref.
2010	The Love Clinic	爱情维修站	Chengcheng	
2010	Welcome to Shama Town	决战刹马镇	Bing's Wife	
2015	Goodbye Mr. Loser	夏洛特烦恼	Ma Dongmei	
2015	Heart for Heaven	一念天堂	Ma Xiaoli	
2016	A Busy Night	情况不妙	Tingting	
2017	Soccer Killer	仙球大战	Gu Yige	
2017	Meow	喵星人	Zhou Lizhu	
2017	Once Upon a Time in the Northeast	东北往事之破马张飞	Zhuang Jiao'ao	
2017	Never Say Die	羞羞的铁拳	Ma Xiao	
2018	Kill Mobile	手机狂响	Han Xiao	
2019	Manchurian Tiger			
2019	Sunshine is Not Bandit	阳光不是劫匪		
2020	My People, My Homeland	我和我的家乡		
2022	Another Me	李茂扮太子		
2022	Too Cool to Kill	这个杀手不太冷静	Mi Lan	
2022	Moon Man	独行月球	Ma Lanxing	
2024	Article 20	第二十条	Li Maojuan	
2024	Successor	抓娃娃	Chunlan	
2025	The Dumpling Queen	水饺皇后	Zang Jianhe	
2025	You Are the Best	你行！你上！	Zhou Xiulan	
2026	Panda Plan: The Magical Tribe	熊猫计划之部落奇遇记	Chieftain	
2026	Traces of Justice	神探之痕迹	Huang Rende	

=== Television series ===
Year	English title	Chinese title	Role	Notes
2005		临界二十天	Chunzi	
2009		单亲妈妈的苦涩浪漫	Mi Baoxiang	
2012	AA Lifestyle	AA制生活	Shen Bihua	
2012		喜事连连：剩男相亲记	Tao Yan	
2013	Mi Family's Marriage	老米家的婚事		Cameo
2013		工人大院	Luo Yuzhang	
2013	Yangguang‘s Summer	杨光的夏天	Xiang Hong	
2014		男媒婆	Shasha	
2015	Lovers & Couples	伙伴夫妻	Han Ling	
2016	Jinling Battle	战金岭	Hua Qijie	
2016	Lunar New Year's Day of Spring	大年初一立春	Li Mang	
2019	Unbeatable You	逆流而上的你	Liu Ai	

=== Variety shows ===
Year	Title	Chinese title	Role	Notes
2023	Natural High	现在就出发	Recurring member	
