= Never Say Die (2017 film) =

- Poster
- Traditional Chinese: 羞羞的鐵拳
- Simplified Chinese: 羞羞的铁拳
- Literal meaning: Bashful Iron Fist
- Hanyu Pinyin: xiūxiū de tiěquán
- Directed by: Song Yang; Zhang Chiyu
- Written by: Zhang Chiyu; Dai Si'ao; Shen Yuyue; Qian Chenguang
- Produced by: Tian Tian; Li Wang; Zhang Li; Li Jie
- Starring: Ai Lun; Ma Li; Shen Teng; Tian Yu; Xue Haowen
- Edited by: Tan Xiangyuan
- Music by: Dong Dongdong
- Production companies: Fun Age Pictures; New Classics Media
- Distributed by: Tianjin Maoyan Media; Huaxia Film Distribution; Sihai Distribution Association; Eastern Mordor
- Release date: 30 September 2017 (China)
- Running time: 100 minutes
- Country: China
- Language: Mandarin
- Box office: CN¥2.18 billion (US$334 million)

Never Say Die (Chinese: 羞羞的铁拳; literally: The Bashful Iron Fist) is a 2017 Chinese comedy film directed by Song Yang and Zhang Chiyu and starring Ai Lun, Ma Li, Shen Teng, Tian Yu and Xue Haowen. Adapted from the popular stage comedy of the same name, it was released in China on 30 September 2017. According to The Hollywood Reporter, the film is the highest-grossing comedy film ever in a single box office market (in this case, its domestic box office market).

== Plot ==
Addison (played by Allen), who makes a living by playing fake punches, was originally an enemy of Ma Xiao (played by Ma Li), a sports reporter with a strong sense of justice. Unexpectedly, due to an accidental electric shock, the bodies of men and women were switched. After gender confusion, the two cheated on each other, causing a great earthquake in the boxing world. They also revealed the secrets of the fake boxing world and caused a lot of trouble. In the end, the two got together under the deputy head of the "Julian Sect" Zhang Zhuyu (played by Zhang Zhuyu). Under the guidance of Shen Teng (played by Shen Teng), he waved a shy iron fist at the evil forces.

The main character, Addison (played by Allen), is a professional boxer with excellent skills but is often defeated in matches due to the manipulation of corrupt forces, leading to a dismal life. On the other hand, Ma Xiao (played by Ma Li) is a female journalist who dares to expose the dark side of the sports world. She is strong-willed, meticulous in her work, and focused on uncovering the injustices in boxing competitions.

In a bizarre twist of fate, Addison and Ma Xiao switch bodies due to a lightning strike during an accidental encounter. This strange event leaves them at a loss, forcing them to face drastically different lifestyles and career challenges. Addison must learn how to work as a woman, especially in the journalism industry, while Ma Xiao must adapt to the life of a male boxer and master complex boxing techniques.

After the initial chaos of switching bodies, Addison and Ma Xiao gradually start adapting to each other's lives. Ma Xiao, in Addison's body, uses her intelligence to gradually expose the corruption in the boxing world, while Addison, in Ma Xiao's body, experiences the hardships and responsibilities of being a journalist. They not only need to tackle external challenges but also face internal growth and transformation.

As the plot progresses, Addison and Ma Xiao's relationship evolves from mutual annoyance to mutual understanding and support. With each other's help, they become stronger and eventually decide to face an upcoming important match together. In this match, they not only have to defeat powerful opponents but also reveal the corruption in boxing competitions, seeking justice for themselves and other athletes.

In the end, with Ma Xiao's wisdom and Addison's boxing skills combined, they successfully expose the injustices in boxing matches and win the competition. The film, set in a light-hearted and humorous atmosphere, conveys positive themes about justice, friendship, and perseverance.

== Cast ==
- Ai Lun
- Ma Li
- Shen Teng
- Tian Yu
- Xue Haowen
- Yin Zheng

== Box office ==
The film is the third highest-grossing in China in 2017 and the sixth highest-grossing ever in the country, with a gross of CN¥2.181 billion (US$334 million).

== Awards and nominations ==
Awards	Category	Recipient	Result	Ref.
9th Macau International Movie Festival	Best Picture	Never Say Die	Nominated	
9th China Film Director's Guild Awards	Best Film	Never Say Die	Nominated	
9th China Film Director's Guild Awards	Best Director	Song Yang, Zhang Chiyu	Nominated	
9th China Film Director's Guild Awards	Best Young Director	Song Yang, Zhang Chiyu	Nominated	
23rd Huading Awards	Best Supporting Actor	Shen Teng	Nominated	
23rd Huading Awards	Best New Director	Song Yang, Zhang Chiyu	Nominated	

On June 22, 2018, the film won the 2017 "Smoke-free Film Award", for the absence of smoking in the film.
