= Love at First Fight =

Chinese television series

- Promotional poster
- 武十郎
- Genre: Martial arts, Romantic Comedy
- Directed by: Cui Bao Zhu 崔宝珠; Wang Zi Ming 王子鳴
- Starring: Wallace Huo 霍建華; Miriam Yeung 楊千嬅; George Hu 胡宇崴
- Opening theme: Strong Hearted Woman 坚强女人心 by Miriam Yeung 楊千嬅
- Ending theme: In My Heart 在我心中 by Xu Song 許頌
- Country of origin: China
- Original language: Mandarin
- No. of episodes: 32

Production
- Producers: Zhang Xiao Wu 張曉武; Ren Zhong Lun 任仲倫
- Production locations: Shanghai, China
- Running time: 45 minutes
- Production companies: Beijing Cultural Development Co., Ltd.北京东王文化发展有限公司; Shanghai Film Group Corporation 上海电影集团公司

Original release
- Release: 25 June – 10 July 2007

Love At First Fight (Chinese: 武十郎; pinyin: Wu Shi Lang; Jyutping: Mo Sop Long) is a 2007 Chinese martial arts and romantic comedy television series, starring Hong Kong actress singer Miriam Yeung, Taiwanese actor singer Wallace Huo, American-born-Taiwanese actor George Hu, Chinese actress Alina Zhang, Michelle Bai and actor Jia Nailiang. Filmed in the summer of 2006 at Qingsheng Studios located in Shanghai, China. The drama was also dubbed in Cantonese for the Hong Kong market. It began airing on Chinese channel Haikou 海口電視台 HKBTV in 2007 and aired on Taiwanese channel FTV in 2008. The story is set in early Republic China era, where the main character Wu Shi Lang has to tackle friendship, dreams, family relationship, and first love with a gender twist.

== Synopsis ==
Fearing that her husband might leave her due to her inability to bring a boy to the family, Mrs. Wu declares her tenth daughter her "tenth" son, who is later named Wu Shi Lang. The goal is for Shi Lang to win as many martial arts competitions as possible, as that's all her father seems to care about. Conflicts arise when she finds herself falling for her childhood friend, Li Ya Shou, who is determined to marry the rich. To stop him from marry the wealthy Lei Xiao Yu, Shi Lang defeats Ya Shou in a martial arts competition. Xiao Yu is greatly impressed and insists on marrying Shi Lang. Things further complicates, when Xiao Yu's younger brother, Lei Sheng Da, encounters the dress-wearing Shi Lang and falls head over heels with her. Shi Lang realizes she is in deep trouble so she skips town after telling everyone she is a woman. Sheng Da follows her to the new town. Although, Shi Lang and Ya Shou are becoming more than friends, Sheng Da's persistence begins to touch her heart, too.

== Summary ==
The story begins one early morning at the Wu residence, Wu Ding Dang is dressed up for his marriage procession with an overweight lady (which was arranged by his mother). On the other hand, Wu Ding Dang's wife is about to give birth to her tenth child. Wu Ding Dang's mother was frustrated with her daughter-in-law for laboring nine granddaughters but no grandson for her, therefore she strongly persuaded her son to marry a concubine into the family. Meanwhile, Wu Ding Dang's wife, Wu Liang Shi who nervously wanted to bring a son to the family was surprised when she delivered another baby girl. Afraid of what was going to happen, she quickly changed the baby girl with another baby boy to overwhelm her mother-in-law and husband. They named their new born baby Wu Shi Lang (Pidge).

In order to hide her true gender from her father, Wu Shi Lang (Pidge)lived as a boy until she became an adult. She dressed, walked, talked and behaved like a boy and everyone in the family and the entire town believed she was a boy. Her childhood friend was Li Ya Shou and she admired him a lot. Li Ya Shou was an orphan and the son of Wu Ding Dang's best friend so he was taken in the Wu residence.

Later on the Lei family arrives at the town where the Wu family lived. The Lei family were wealthy and powerful. Lei Lao Hu is the matriarch, she has exceptional martial arts skills. Lei Xiao Yu, the eldest and only daughter of Lao Hu's two children is a beautiful young lady that her mother uses to lure people into signing up for their fighting competitions. Lei Sheng Da, the youngest and only son of Lao Hu's children is good looking, tall, and good at martial arts like his mother, but his flaws are childish, spoil and lazy. He also always gets lost when he ventures out of his home as he never bothers to memorize directions to get back home and depends on the Lei family butler Chang Ling Lu to bring him around places.

Li Ya Shou was attracted to the Lei's family wealth and Lei Xiao Yu's beauty, because of this he signed up for the Lei's fighting competition to win Xiao Yu's hand in marriage. On the other hand, Lei Sheng Da meets Wu Shi Lang (Pidge) one night when she dressed as girl and he asked her for directions. Shi Lang got annoyed at Sheng Da for asking too many questions and started fighting with him physically, it was during the midst of their fight that he fell in love with her. Sheng Da goes to the Wu family house the next day to look for Shi Lang (Pidge)and was met by Ya Shou, since Ya Shou is not aware that Shi Lang (Pidge)is a girl he thought Sheng Da was in love with Mrs. Wu. One day while Xiao Yu is venturing out in town alone she is harassed by a group of men, Ya Shou originally wanted to save her but took too long imagining his hero outcome so Shi Lang (Pidge)ends up saving Xiao Yu instead. Xiao Yu falls in love with Wu Shi and ask her mom to automatically sign Shi Lang (Pidge)up for their fighting competition.

Ya Shou takes Lei Lao Hu by surprise with a Kung Fu move she recognizes and beats her during the competition to win. During Ya Shou's celebration on winning Shi Lang is overcome with jealousy imagining Y(Pidge)a Shou's life with Xiao Yu and enters the competition at the last moment to beat Ya Shou and win the competition. Xiao Yu is extremely happy because that would mean Shi Lang (Pidge)has to marry her since she is the prize for winning the competition. Sheng Da is confused since Shi Lang (Pidge)looks so much like the girl he had fallen in love with. After the competition Shi Lang (Pidge) goes to the Lei residence to tell them that she can't marry Xiao Yu because she is a girl. Lei Lao Hu and Xiao Yu does not believe Shi Lang (Pidge)and locks her up in a room at their house. Each of the Lei siblings goes into the room they locked up Shi Lang (Pidge)in individually to question her gender. When Sheng Da asked Shi Lang (Pidge)if she is a girl or boy Shi Lang (Pidge)tells him that she's a boy and was only dressed as a girl to catch a pervert. When Xiao Yu asked Shi Lang (Pidge)if she was a girl or boy Shi Lang (Pidge)tells her she is really a girl, but she doesn't believe her and still insist to her mother and brother that Shi Lang (Pidge) is a boy.

Due to the Lei family incident Mrs. Wu comes clean to her husband about Shi Lang's (Pidge's) real gender in order for him to rescue Shi Lang (Pidge) from the Lei family house. Upon arriving at the Lei house Wu Ding Dang and Lei Lao Hu realize they had both met each other years ago. According to Lei Lao Hu they were each other's first love but according to Wu Ding Dang she was a girl he had regretted rescuing from an abandon well since she would stalk him non- stop and couldn't take a hint that he didn't like her. Wu Ding Dong knows that Lei Lao Hu is very powerful in martial arts, knowing he is no match for her and not wanting to offend her he lies to her that if Shi Lang (Pidge) marries any one of her children then it would mean they can't be lovers. He tells her to release Shi Lang (Pidge)and that they will meet up later to discuss their relationship. Lei Lao Hu being selfish chooses her own love life over her children's and releases Shi Lang (Pidge) thinking her and Ding Dong will be married later on. Once the Wu's return to their home they realize they cannot win Lei Lao Hu so they decide to pack up and skip town that same night. The Lei's find out the Wu's had skipped town when each of them later that night individually goes to the Wu family house to look for the person they love.

The Wu's settle at Qing Mao town, because their niece A Hao lives there. A Hao grew up as an orphan but she currently runs a noodle shop that serves very bad tasting noodles. She takes advantage of all the perverted men in town that comes to her noodle shop to watch her make noodles. She is a very stingy girl who loves money and plans to marry a rich man. She has a childhood friend, Lin Chi that is an orphan that grew up with her and works as a carpenter. She actually is in love with him and knows he loves her too but because he is poor and she loves money more she ignores her love for him and his love for her.

The story becomes interesting, when everyone reaches Qing Mao town. Lei Xiao Yu begins to accept Li Ya Shou, while A Hao wants to marry Lei Sheng Da because he comes from a wealthy family. Only Wu Shi Lang (Pidge) felt lonely, because Li Ya Shou is now with Lei Xiao Yu, from there on she begins to accept Lei Sheng Da as her friend since he is so devoted to her. Lei Sheng Da not being able to tell the difference between love and friendship thinks it was the first move to win her heart.

The story ends with Wu Shi Lang (Pidge) and Li Ya Shou becoming lovers, while Lei Xiao Yu found her true love in Chang Ling Lu and they got married. A Hao finally realized that money is not everything and accepted Lin Chi as her husband. Only Lei Sheng Da ended up alone because he only wanted to bless Wu Shi Lang happiness, to make Wu Shi Lang (Pidge) happy was to let her be with the one she loves the most which is Li Ya Shou.

== Main cast ==
- Miriam Yeung (楊千嬅) as Wu Shi Lang (Pidge) 武十郎 – Female 24 years old

The main character of the story. Wu Shi Lang is a humble and responsible person. She is forced to live as a boy from birth to her early adult years because of her family situation. She has good martial arts skill that she learned from her father Wu Ding Dang. Wu Shi Lang fights for justice in the Shi Li and Qing Mao (towns that she lives in) and appreciates her friendship with Li Ya Shou. At the end both Li Ya Shou and Lei Sheng Da fights to win her love.

- Wallace Huo (霍建華) as Li Ya Shou (Keith)李亚寿 – Male 25 years old

His parents died when he was young, he was taken in and raised by the Wu family. His father Mao Mao was a respected man in martial arts and he looks exactly like him. Li Ya Shou is optimistic, loyal, and materialistic. His wish is to marry a rich and beautiful woman, so it can change his life as a poor man. Although Li Ya Shou is very lazy and boastful, he also appreciates the friendship with Wu Shi Lang, and fights for justice.

- George Hu (胡宇崴) as Lei Sheng Da (Harry) 雷声大 – Male 25 years old

He is a tall, good-looking and talented gentleman. Lei Sheng Da is heavily influenced by Western culture. He is the son of Lei Lao Hu and the younger brother of Lei Xiao Yu. He and his sister Lei Xiao Yu both have an extreme belief in love. Lei Sheng Da falls in love with Wu Shi Lang the first time he sees her. He is optimistic and smiles even having hard times. Lei Sheng Da inherits his mother's martial arts.

- Zhang Meng (張萌) as Lei Xiao Yu (Lina) 雷小雨 – Female 26 years old

She is a tall and beautiful woman. Lei Xiao Yu dreams for a true hero to appear and protect her. There are several men that she thought of as her true love, such as Wu Shi Lang, Li Ya Shou and Lin Chi. In the end she falls in love with the Lei family butler Chang Ling Lu, and they get married.

== Supporting cast ==
- Jia Nailiang (贾乃亮) as Lin Chi (Garry) 林池 – Male 24 years old

He is a naive but responsible man. He only wants to live a simple life as a carpenter. He has been in love with A Hao since their childhood, since he is poor and cannot provide the life she wants he supports her when she pursues Sheng Da because he only wants her to be happy. At the end of the story, he becomes a rich man when he inherits his aunt's properties.

- Bai Xue (柏雪) as A Hao (Hanna)阿好 – Female 22 years old

She runs a noodle shop that serves noodles that taste really bad but perverted men's keep going back to her shop in order to watch her make noodles. Her materialistic character makes her ignore her real love. At first the thought of money is everything to her. She even pushes herself to pursue Lei Sheng Da even though she doesn't love him but because he is rich and she wants the Lei family wealth. At the end she realizes love is stronger than money, accepts her fate and marries Lin Chi the man she really loves.

- Zhang Yi Sheng (張翊生) as Chang Ling Lu(Lance) 常领路 – Male 28 years old

He is the head servant of the Lei family household. His main job is to bring Sheng Da around places in town because Sheng Da does not know how to remember directions or how to find his way back home. Xiao Yu falls in love with him when he risk his life to protect her from Bai Qiu Feng. Lei Lao Hu is highly against them being together because he is a servant, so he leaves the Lei family to find his own wealth. Later on he comes back a wealthy man and marries Xiao Yu.

- Pai Bing-bing (白冰冰) as Lei Lao Hu (Dane) 雷老虎 – Female 52 years old

The matriarch of the Lei family. She is Xiao Yu and Sheng Da mother. Like her children she is also a love sick person. She is very skilled and powerful in martial arts making everyone in town afraid of her. She believes that she is in love with Wu Ding Dong and has been stalking him since they were young. It is at the end when he built up his courage to tell her he doesn't like her that she tells him he should have told her all along because she thought he was in love with her.

- Zhang Guoli (張國立) as Wu Ding Dang (Jacob) 武丁当 – Male 55 years old

Wu Shi Lang's father. He originally runs a martial arts school but had to leave the original town he and his family lived in to escape Lei Lao Hu. In his new town he runs a Chinese medicine shop. He finds out his tenth child Shi Lang is really a girl when she is forced to marry Lei Xiao Yu after winning the Lei family fighting competition. When he was young he saved Lei Lao Hu from an abandoned well and she has been in love and stalking him ever since.

- Cai Jing (蔡晶) as Wu Liang Shi (Mrs. Wu) (Lisa)武梁氏 – Female 52 years old

Wu Ding Dong's wife and Shi Lang's mother. She is forced to have her tenth daughter live a life as a boy in order to prevent her husband from marrying a concubine into the Wu family. She is supportive of Lei Sheng Da pursuing Shi Lang because she wants her daughter to find a good man for marriage.

- Li Yi Xiao (李依晓) as Shang Xi (Nana)尚喜 – Female 19 years old

She is Shang Zhong's daughter. She pretends to be an innocent girl who needs someone to protect her but she is really skilled in martial arts. Even her father does not know she is skilled in martial arts. She is also madly in love with Li Ya Shou even though he is with Xiao Yu. She uses dirty tactics such as lying that they had slept together and she is pregnant with his child in order get him. Wu Shi Lang later exposes her.

- Fang Zhou Po (方舟波) as Shang Zhong (Jerrod) 尚忠 – Male 55 years old

He is old friends with Wu Ding Dong and a highly skilled martial arts person. He is Shang Xi's father. Wu Shi Lang and Li Ya Shou soughts him out in order to learn the dragon dance fight so they can beat Lei Lao Hu and Lei Sheng Da to win the Dragon Dance fight competition.

- Zhang Chun Zhong (张春仲) as Bai Qiu Feng(Ping) 白秋风 – Male 65 years old

He is an escaped criminal who is highly skilled in martial arts, even Lei Lao Hu cannot beat him. He was Li Ya Shou father Mao Mao's Sifu and because he is mentally unstable he believes Ya Shou is his former pupil Mao Mao.

- Dong Zhi Hua (董志华) as Ping Jian ( Shannon) 平坚 – Male 36 years old

The local gangster boss at Qing Mao town. When the Wu and Lei family arrives at Qing Mao town he harasses both family for money, instead of giving him money they beat him up instead. He causes lots of trouble for everyone by trying to fix the fight competitions.

- Mo Mei Lin (莫美林) as Jin Qian Bao (Timothy) 金钱豹 – Male 28 years old

He runs the local martial arts school at Qing Mao town. At first he does not take Shi Lang seriously but after seeing how skilled she is at martial arts he becomes one of her followers.

== Cameos ==
- He Jie (何洁) as Qian Xiao Xiao 钱小小

A rich girl Li Ya Shou tries to court. Episode 1.

- Liu Dong (劉冬) as Lin Zhong He 林中鹤

Girl Mr and Mrs Wu tries to set Wu Shi Lang up with. Episode 1.

- Xu Song (許頌) as Tian Mi 田蜜

Chang Ling Lu's secretary when he becomes a rich man. Episode 32.

- Zhang Yu (張宇) as Ping Jian's assistant 坚师爷

== Music ==
- Opening theme song: Strong Hearted Woman (堅強女人心) by Miriam Yeung 楊千嬅
- Ending theme song: In my Heart (在我心中) by Xu Song 许颂

Insert songs

- Snow Season (下雪的季節) by Daniel Chang 張峰奇
- Direction of Night (夜的方向) by Daniel Chang 張峰奇
- Love You One More Day (多愛你一天) by Daniel Chang 張峰奇

== Production credits ==
- Producer: Zhang Xiao Wu 張曉武, Ren Zhong Lun 任仲倫
- Director: Cui Bao Zhu 崔宝珠, Wang Zi Ming 王子鳴
