= Jia Nailiang =

Chinese actor

- Born: 12 April 1984 (age 42); Harbin, Heilongjiang
- Education: Beijing Film Academy
- Occupations: Actor; television presenter
- Years active: 2002–present
- Agent: Huayi Brothers
- Spouse: Li Xiaolu (m. 2012; div. 2019)
- Children: Tian Xin

Chinese name
- Traditional Chinese: 賈乃亮
- Simplified Chinese: 贾乃亮
Transcriptions
Standard Mandarin
- Hanyu Pinyin: Jiǎ Nǎi Liàng

Jia Nailiang (Chinese: 贾乃亮; pinyin: Jiǎ Nǎi Liàng, born 12 April 1984) is a Chinese actor. Jia graduated from Beijing Film Academy. Jia ranked 50th on Forbes China Celebrity 100 list 2015, 33rd in 2017, and 96th in 2019.

== Personal life ==
Jia married actress Li Xiaolu in 2012. The same year, Li gave birth to their daughter, Jelena. In October 2019, Li was revealed to have shot three intimate videos with rapper PG One, who was revealed to have been her lover in 2017. Jia and Li divorced on November 14, 2019.

== Filmography ==
=== Film ===
Year	English title	Chinese title	Role	Notes/Ref.
2006	The 601st Phone Call	第601个电话	Yi Shu’s ex-boyfriend	Special appearance
2007	Evening of Roses	夜玫瑰	Ye Meijia	
2013	Striving in Beijing with Love	爱拼北京	Ling Jun	
2017	Once Upon a Time in the Northeast	东北往事之破马张飞	Cheng Libing	
2018	The Faces of My Gene	祖宗十九代	Wang Xiao'er	
2019	S.W.A.T.	特警队		

=== Television series ===
Jia Nailiang's television appearances
Year	English title	Chinese title	Role	Notes/Ref.
2002	Holiday in Beijing	北京假日	Mu Mu	
2003	High Flying Songs of Tang Dynasty	大唐飞歌	Yin Menghe	
2004	Warriors of the Yang Clan	杨门虎将	Yang Liulang	
2004	Stars	满天星	Wang Chongguang	
2005	Fire	孽火	Zhou Shuilong	
2006	Sculpting in Time	雕刻时光	Liang Feng	
2006	Beautiful Decibels	美丽分贝	Zheng Yutai	
2006	Emerald on the Roof	屋顶上的绿宝石	Tang Shijie	
2006	Romance of Red Dust	风尘三侠之红拂女	Yang Xuangan	
2007	In the Name of Love	以爱情的名义	Zhou Liseng	
2007	Love at First Fight	武十郎	Lin Chi	
2007	Silent Tears	女人不哭	Zhang Zihua	
2007	Snow on Fire	雪在烧	Wen Jie	
2008	A Hundred Things about Life	人生百事	Zhao Yongli	
2009	Burning Rose	燃烧的玫瑰	Luo Zheng	
2009	Chuntao's War	春桃的战争	Er Hu	
2010	You Are My Home	你是我的生命	Qin Yan	
2010	Bridge of Life and Death	生死桥	Tang Huaiyu	
2010	I Need a Home	我要一个家	Fang Yishan	
2011	Take What to Save You, My Love	新拿什么拯救你，我的爱人	Han Ding	
2011	My Mother and My Mother-in-Law	当婆婆遇上妈	Chen Dake	
2011	Family Property	家产	Gu Yaoting	
2012	The Undercover Team	便衣支队	Mai Xiaolong	
2012	The Girls	女人帮·妞儿	Gao Fushuai	Special appearance
2012	Rules Before A Divorce	离婚前规则	Wang Minxuan	
2012	The Young Couple	小两口	Liu Dong	
2013	Best Time	最美的时光	Song Yi	
2013	Home With Happy Wife	家有喜妇	Man Yi	
2014	Accoucheur	产科男医生	Zuo You	
2014	50 First Dates	我的失忆女友	Jiang Minliang	
2015	Destined to Love You	偏偏喜欢你	Xiang Hao	
2015	Ice and Fire of Youth	冰与火的青春	Jiang Yan	
2015	Anti Japanese Hero Qu Jiguang	抗倭英雄戚继光	Tang Xinzhi	
2016	Housewife Detective	煮妇神探	Mao Xuyi	
2016	Magical Space-time	奇妙的时光之路	Han Ruofei	
2017	Master Healing	复合大师	Li Duan	
2017	Season Love	何所冬暖，何所夏凉	Xi Chichen	
2018	Strategy	兵临棋下	Shaobai	
2019	Pushing Hands	推手	Liu Qingyang	
2019	Nine Kilometers of Love	九千米爱情	Chu Fei	Cameo
2019	Paratrooper Spirit	伞兵魂	Zhang Qi	
2020	Together	在一起		
2020	Challenges at Midlife	落花时节	Tian Jingye	
2021	Romance with the Star	愛在星空下	Su Xing	
2024	Imagination Season	创想季	Yu Pengyue	

=== Variety show ===
Year	English title	Chinese title	Notes/Ref.
2014	Dad is Back	爸爸回来了	
2019	Haha Farmer	哈哈农夫	
2019	Go Fighting!	极限挑战	
2023	Natural High	现在就出发	

== Awards and nominations ==
Year	Award	Category	Nominated work	Result	Ref.
2012	8th Huading Awards	Best Actor (Contemporary Drama)	My Mom and My Mother-in-Law	Won	
2019	11th China TV Drama Awards	Acting Breakthrough Actor	—N/a	Won	
