= Meow (2017 film) =

2017 Hong Kong film by Benny Chan

- Film poster
- Traditional Chinese: 喵星人
- Simplified Chinese: 喵星人
- Hanyu Pinyin: Miāo Xīng Rén
- Jyutping: Maau1 Sing1 Jan4
- Directed by: Benny Chan
- Screenplay by: Ho Miu-kei; Poon Chun-lam
- Produced by: Benny Chan
- Starring: Louis Koo; Ma Li; Jessica Liu; Andy Wong
- Narrated by: Sammy Leung
- Cinematography: Edmond Fung
- Edited by: Yau Chi-wai
- Music by: Wong Kin-wai
- Production companies: One Cool CMC; Emperor Film Production Company; Gravity Pictures Film Production iQiyi Motion Pictures (Beijing); PJ One Cool Film; Pomelo Film Company; Dalian Erdong Filming and Culture; One Cool Ocean Films; One Cool Film Productions
- Distributed by: Emperor Motion Pictures
- Release dates: 14 July 2017 (China); 20 July 2017 (Hong Kong)
- Running time: 100 minutes
- Country: Hong Kong
- Languages: Cantonese; Mandarin
- Budget: US$14.5 million
- Box office: US$7.1 million

Meow is a 2017 Hong Kong science fantasy comedy drama film directed and produced by Benny Chan. It stars Louis Koo as a father who adopts an alien cat who is sent to invade Earth. Co-produced by Koo's One Cool Group Limited, the film is also Chan and Koo's sixth film collaboration as director and star respectively. and it was one of the last films directed by Benny Chan during his lifetime.

== Plot ==
In the distant corners of the universe, a planet of alien cats known as "Meow" exists whose creatures are more civilized than earthlings. Thousands of years ago, the king of Meow has been sending messengers to inquire the Earth, hoping to prepare for an invasion. However, over the years, every messenger sent to Earth never returned forcing the king to put aside his plans.

Today, the king decides to re-ignite his plan and selects the bravest and mightiest warrior of Meow, Pudding, as a vanguard to Earth. However, during the journey, Pudding loses a divine Meow device that can resist the particles of Earth and loses his divine powers. As a result, the lean-built Pudding becomes a giant fat cat Sai-sai-lei. Sai-sai-lei is then adopted by as a pet by a family consists of Ng Sau-lung (Louis Koo), his wife Chow Lai-chu (Ma Li), their elder son Ng Yau-choi (Andy Wong) and younger daughter Ng Yau-yau (Jessica Liu). Sai-sai-lei has no choice but to hide in the Ng household before finding his device to invade Earth. In order to start the invasion, Sai-sai-lei plans to cause chaos to the Ng family but after living and getting along together, Sai-sai-lei is moved by the family's love and sincerity and loses his desire for warfare. However, one day, Sai-sai-lei suddenly recovers his device.

== Cast ==
- Louis Koo as Ng Sau-lung (吳守龍), a well-known goalkeeper in Hong Kong with a brilliant track record who after retiring, becomes an occasional commentator for football matches, but longs to become the leader of a football team. Sau-lung is a kind-hearted man and good father, but he often dreams of getting rich over night and his mind is full of strange entrepreneurial ideas and plans which often backfire and fail in the end.
- Ma Li as Ng Chow Lai-chu (吳周麗珠), an unpopular model resulting in little workload and is often idle at home. Lai-chu is very loving to her children and is often angered by her husband's entrepreneurial plans, but would always forgive him in the end. Sandra Ng provided the Cantonese voice of the character.
- Jessica Liu as Ng Yau-yau (吳優優), the youngest girl in the family who was born with a disability on her left foot where she must wear long-term auxiliary equipment. Everyone in her family dearly cares for her while she also shares the closest bond with Sai-sai-lei.
- Andy Wong as Ng Yau-choi (吳優才), a year 2 secondary school student who dreams of becoming a film director who often holds a camera in his hand filming trivial things in his life to post on the internet, hoping to shoot to fame. His dream comes true when he films and posts online a video of Sai-sai-lei, becoming a "famed director" of the internet overnight.
- Michelle Wai as Miss Lee (李老師), Yau-yau's physical education teacher who is normally very caring towards Yau-yau. At the same time, she also develops romantic feelings towards Sau-lung.
- Louis Yuen as Mister Lam (林生), Sau-lung's boss who always says he will organise a football team for Sau-lung to lead but never actually takes action. He also loves to come up with lame gags.
- Grasshopper as The Conmen Trio (騙徒三人組), three leaders of a fraud organisation who pose as a Buddhist monk, Thai native and an angry Chaozhou native respectively. The trio sells a map to a Ming dynasty treasure to Sau-lung in an attempt to con his life savings.
- Lo Hoi-pang as a debt collector.
- Allen
- Chui Ka-lok as Pudding (西米露), originally the bravest and mightiest warrior of planet Meow, but he loses a divine Meow device while descending to Earth, loses all his divine powers as a result and accidentally transforming into a fat cat who is then adopted by Sau-lung and renamed Sai-sai-lei (犀犀利). Having a big stature and born with a cute face, Sai-sai-lei begins to pick up the bad habits of human beings of being lazy and loving to eat and fell in love with potato chips, gradually losing his desire for warfare.
- Lam Chi-chung
- Harriet Yeung as Miss Kam (金老師), a teacher in Yau-yau's school.
- Carl Ng as a doctor.

== Production ==
=== Development ===
According to the first behind-the-scenes featurette released, producer and director Benny Chan stated the story of Meow was initiated by star Louis Koo when the latter told Chan he wanted to make a film about cats which resulted in Chan having the idea about cats from another planet.

=== Special effects ===
In order to create the film's titular cat, Sai-sai-lei (犀犀利), three special effect companies were used to create over 1,000 special effect shots. Of the three special effects companies, two of them were local Hong Kong companies while one of them was South Korean and they were responsible for separately creating the CG for Sai-sai-lei's head, lower body and entire body.

== Release ==
The Society for the Prevention of Cruelty to Animals of Hong Kong (SPCA) held a charity preview screening of Meow on 16 July 2017 at The Metroplex cinema located in the Kowloonbay International Trade & Exhibition Centre to raise funds for animals that were abandoned, cruelly treated or injured in accidents before being theatrically released in Hong Kong on 20 July 2017. The film was also released in China on 14 July 2017.

== Reception ==
The film has grossed HK$2.2 million in Hong Kong and CN¥44.76 million in China.
