= Tia Lee =

Taiwanese singer, actress and model (born 1985)

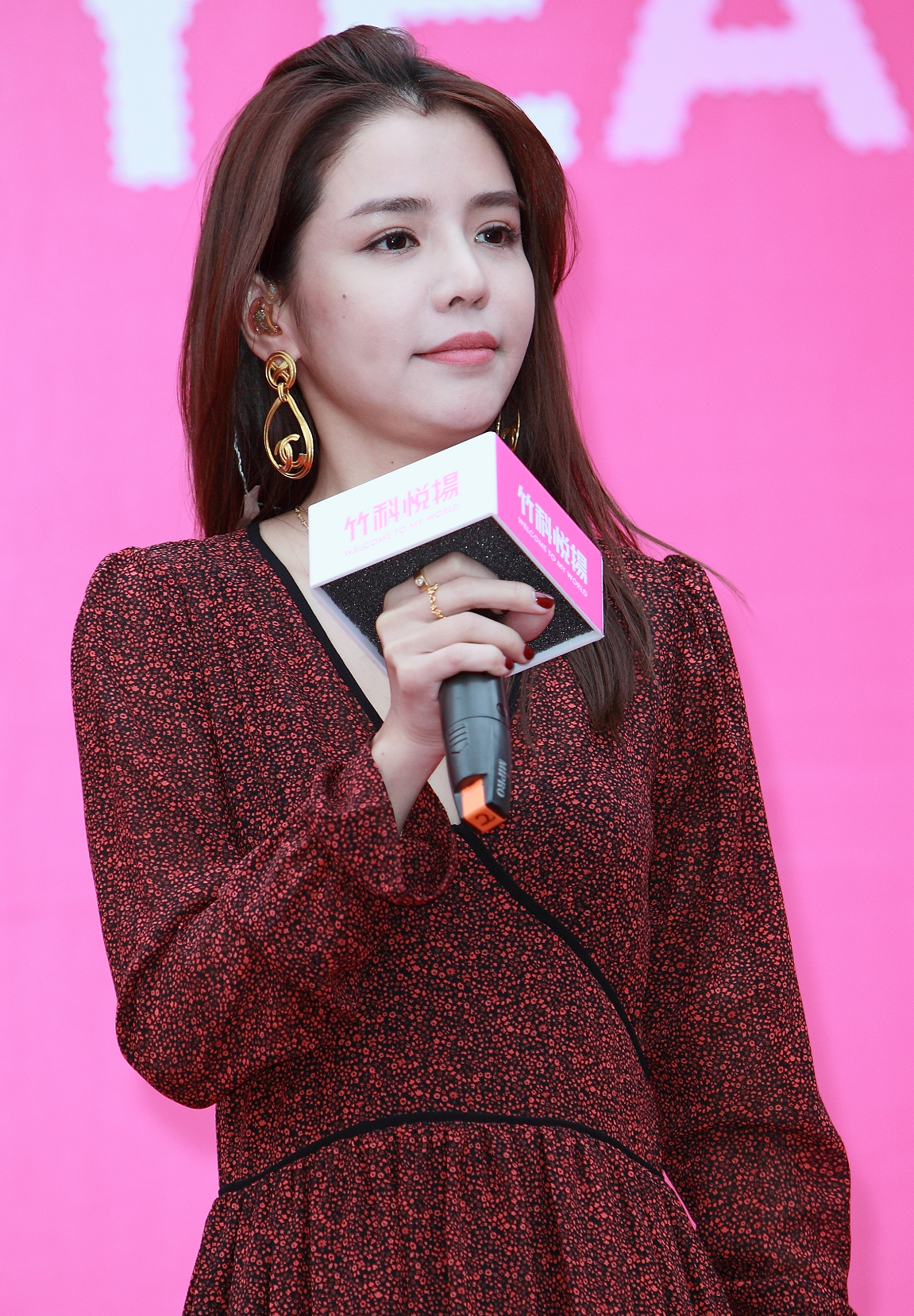
- Born: May 11, 1985 (age 41); Luzhou, Taipei County, Taiwan
- Occupations: Singer, actress, model
- Years active: 2003–present
- Musical career
- Also known as: Tia Li; Li Yu-fen
- Genres: Mandopop
- Instrument: Vocals
- Labels: Linfair Records (2011–2015); Sony Music Taiwan (2016–present)

Chinese name
- Traditional Chinese: 李毓芬
Transcriptions
Standard Mandarin
- Hanyu Pinyin: Lǐyùfēn

Tia Lee Yu-fen (Chinese: 李毓芬; pinyin: Lǐyùfēn; born 11 May 1985) is a singer and actress from Taiwan. She is a former member of the girl band Dream Girls.

Tia Lee has modelled at major fashion shows and appeared on the cover of Elle Malaysia, Elle Vietnam, FG 美妆 Beauty Taiwan, FHM China, Harper's Bazaar Indonesia, Harper's Bazaar Vietnam, L'Officiel Malaysia, L'Officiel Singapore, L'Officiel Vietnam, Marie Claire Hong Kong, and digital covers of Elle Singapore, Harper's Bazaar Thailand, Vogue Hong Kong, and more.

Lee is an advocate of women empowerment's. She established the #EmpowerHer movement to raise awareness and support for women-centric charitable organisations.

== Education ==
Lee graduated from Dao Jiang Senior High School of Nursing and Home Economics majoring in cosmetology.

== Music career ==
In 2010, Lee, Emily Song and Puff Kuo formed the Dream Girls. In 2011, Dream Girls released their debut EP "Beautiful Dreams", and Li Yufen also starred in the short musical movie Dying For Love.

In 2016, Lee joined Sony Music and released the music single Not Good Enough. In July she participated in the charity song Give It A Home.

In 2018, Lee released her solo single We Should Have (早應該). In 2019, Lee endorsed the Xianxia MMO game 美人刹 (aka “Beauty Brake” or “Game of Immortal Legend”)

In December 2022, Lee's single "Goodbye Princess"—produced by American music producer Swizz Beatz—was released on YouTube, shortly afterwards setting the record for the fastest Chinese pop music video to reach 100 million views on YouTube, doing so within a month.

== Acting career ==
Lee made her acting debut in the 2006 television series New Stars in the Night playing a small role. In 2012, she starred in the romantic comedy Miss Rose (最完美的女孩). In 2014, she starred in the drama series Fall in Love with Me opposite Aaron Yan.

In 2016, Lee starred in the thriller The Perfect Girl (最完美的女孩) with Ray Chang and the thriller Please Keep Away (请勿靠近). In 2015, she starred in the sci-fi drama Future Mr. Right (來自未來的史密特) and in 2016 the thriller The Perfect Girl (最完美的女孩). In 2019, the romantic, musical road movie One Headlight (絕世情歌) starring Bor-Jeng Chen was released. In this movie, Lee played the heroine Fei, an optimistic free spirit.

In November 2022, Lee began to release a series of 6 short animated videos entitled "Goodbye Princess", each 30 seconds long, in advance of her new single "Goodbye Princess", to be released the following month. Directed by Tang Yat-Sing, illustrated by Mandy Mackenzie Ng, and with music composed by Zhu Yun, the Goodbye Princess animation series was based on Lee's own thoughts and encounters when she began her showbiz career. Each episode borrowed a "princess" character from the fairy tale world.

== Fashion ==
Lee has modelled for the covers of art, culture, lifestyle and fashion magazines including Vogue, Rollacoaster, Marie Claire, and Elle, and has been at a number of international fashion shows. She shares beauty and fashion tips through Vogue’s social media channels.

In November 2022, Lee featured as the cover of Vogue Hong Kong’s digital edition wearing Gucci x Adidas collaboration together with an interview about her experience in the industry. In December 2022, she appeared in a Burberry outfit on the global cover of Rollacoaster, a UK fashion and music magazine.

Lee has been invited to fashion and brand events by Louis Vuitton and Swarovski.

== Charitable activities ==
Lee established the #EmpowerHer campaign to raise awareness and support for women-centric charitable organisations. The #EmpowerHer project has donated money raised to women empowerment charities including Women in Music in USA, Beats by Girlz in Europe, Africa and Americas, Teen’s Key in Hong Kong and Daughters of Tomorrow Singapore as initial recipients. Each YouTube view of the ‘Goodbye Princess’ Music Video raises money for women empowerment charities worldwide as part of the #EmpowerHer campaign.

Since the #EmpowerHer campaign was launched TikTokers created a viral dance for the ‘Goodbye Princess’ song with the #EmpowerHerDance challenge which fueled the campaign's international ambitions with Australian Hannah Balanay, and continued to spread to TikTokers and dancers from different regions and nations. As a result, female duo DJ Olivia and Miriam Nervo did a remix of the ‘Goodbye Princess’ song and launched the #EmpowerHerMusic campaign in support of the #EmpowerHer women empowerment initiative.

== Filmography ==
=== Television series ===
Year	Network	English title	Original title	Role
2006		New Stars in the Night	新昨夜星辰	Qiu Su Yun
2010	FTV	Summer's Desire	泡沫之夏	Ou Xing Ya
2011	FTV	Hayate the Combat Butler	旋風管家	Maria and Athena Tennousu (duo roles)
2011	TTV/SETTV	Office Girls	小資女孩向前衝	Zheng Kai Er
2012	TTV	Miss Rose	螺絲小姐要出嫁	Zhong Xiao Ke
2012		In Between	半熟恋人	Yuan Jiawen
2013	FTV	Fabulous Boys	原來是美男	Herself
2014	JSTV	Tao Lady	淘女郎	Tian Xin
2014	TTV/SETTV	Fall in Love With Me	愛上兩個我	Tao Le Si
2015	Line TV	Lost? Me Too	迷徒·Claire	Claire
2016	CTV	Future Mr. Right	來自未來的史密特	Mi Xue
2017	EBC	Jojo's World	我和我的四個男人	Jojo Lin Chun-jiao

=== Feature film ===
Year	English title	Original title	Role
2017	The Perfect Girl	最完美的女孩	Yeh Hsin
2017	Please Keep Away	请勿靠近	Xiaoya
2019	One Headlight	絕世情歌	Fei

=== Short film ===
Year	English title	Original title	Note(s)
2011	Share The love	分享爱	
2012	Dying For love	减叹日记之	Music

=== Animation ===
Year	English title
2022	Goodbye Princess Episode 1: Falling in the Deep
2022	Goodbye Princess Episode 2: Stuck in Time
2022	Goodbye Princess Episode 3: The Puppet
2022	Goodbye Princess Episode 4: Pawn to Queen
2022	Goodbye Princess Episode 5: Temptation Apple
2022	Goodbye Princess Episode 5: The Beginning

=== Music video appearances ===
Year	Song title	Details
2006	"One Umbrella"; (一把傘)	Singer(s): 183 Club; Album: The First Album
2007	"Second Break Up"; (第二次分手)	Singer(s): Denny Tang (鄧寧); Album: Invincible (万夫莫敌)
2009	"The Moment of Silence"; (沉默的瞬間)	Singer(s): Nicholas Teo (張棟樑); Album: The Moment of Silence (沉默的瞬間)
2009	"After The Break Up"; (說分手之後)	Singer(s): Xiaoyu Sung (小宇); Album: ''Stand Here'' (就站在這裡)
2010	"Love, Have You"; (愛，有你)	Singer(s): Chang Chin Chiao (張晉樵); Album: Love, Have You (愛，有你)
2010	"Live To Be A Hundred"; (活到一百歲)	Singer(s): Rynn Lim (林宇中); Album: ''Dearest Bride'' (新娘)
2013	"I Remember"	Singer(s): F.I.R. (飛兒樂團); Album: ''Better Life''
2014	"That's Not Me"; (這不是我)	Singer(s): Aaron Yan (炎亞綸); Album: Drama
2014	"Do Not Say GoodBye"; (別說GoodBye)	Singer(s): George Hu (胡宇威); Album: George Hu Solo EP (胡宇威個人EP)
2014	"爱就是"	Singer(s): George Hu (胡宇威); Album:
2014	"说不出我爱你"	Singer(s): George Hu (胡宇威); Album:
2022	"Goodbye Princess"; (再见公主)	Singer(s): Tia Lee

== Discography ==
- With Dream Girls

=== Studio albums ===
#	Mandarin title	English title	Release date	Label
1st	美夢當前	Dream Girls	April 8, 2011	Linfair Records Limited / DECCA
2nd	Girl's Talk	Girl's Talk	December 7, 2012	Linfair Records Limited / DECCA
3rd	美麗頭條	Beautiful	December 27, 2013	Linfair Records Limited / DECCA

=== Singles ===
Mandarin title	English title	Released
风色幻想	"Wind Fantasy"	2011
是我不夠好	"Not Good Enough"	2016
给它一个家	"Give it a home"	2016
早應該	"We Should Have"	2018
相信你	"Believe in You"	2019
再見公主	"Goodbye Princess"	2022
