= Emerald on the Roof =

2006 Chinese and Taiwanese TV series

- Promotional poster
- 屋頂上的綠寶石
- Genre: RomanceDrama
- Written by: Du Zheng Zhe 杜政哲
- Directed by: Wang Zi Ming 王子鳴
- Starring: Wallace Huo (霍建華); Betty Sun Li (孫儷); George Hu (胡宇崴); Yvonne Yau (姚采穎)
- Opening theme: Actually, I Really Love You 其實很愛你 by Angela Chang 張韶涵
- Ending theme: One Memory 一個人彈琴 by Claire 郭靜
- Country of origin: Republic of China (Taiwan)
- Original language: Mandarin
- No. of series: 1
- No. of episodes: 30

Production
- Producer: Cui Bao Zhu 崔宝珠
- Production locations: Sanya City, Hainan Island, China; Shanghai, China; London, England; Scotland
- Running time: 45 minutes
- Production companies: Beijing Cultural Development Co., Ltd. Dong Wang 北京东王文化发展有限公司; Shanghai Film Group Corporation 上海电影集团公司; Beijing Cultural Development Co., Ltd. China Audiovisual Online 北京华夏视听在线文化发展有限公司

Original release
- Network: Gala Television (GTV)
- Release: 30 September – 1 December 2006

Related
- Tokyo Juliet 東方茱麗葉; Hanazakarino Kimitachihe 花樣少年少女

Emerald On The Roof (simplified Chinese: 屋顶上的绿宝石; traditional Chinese: 屋頂上的綠寶石; pinyin: Wū dǐng shàng de Lǜ bǎo shí) is a 2006 Chinese and Taiwanese romance television drama series starring Wallace Huo, Sun Li, Yvonne Yao, and introducing George Hu. Filming began on September 20, 2005 in Sanya City, Hainan Island, China. Other filming locations includes Shanghai China, London England and Scotland. It began airing on Taiwan channel GTV from September 30, 2006 to December 1, 2006 with 30 episodes total.

This drama marks American born Taiwanese actor George Hu's acting debut and first ever drama series. He has since rose to fame playing the lead role Lan Shi-de in 2012 Taiwanese drama "Love, Now" and as An De Wang in 2013 Mainland China costume drama "Lan Ling Wang". His voice was dubbed for "Emerald On The Roof" as his Chinese pronunciations was not fluent back then.

On January 27. 2014 Japanese channel Asia Dramatic TV (ADTV) will be re-airing the entirety of "Emerald On The Roof" due to the current popularity of George Hu.

== Synopsis ==
In this modern day retelling of Shakespeare's ROMEO AND JULIET, Zhou Nian Zhong (Wallace Huo) and Mo Jia Qi (Betty Sun) fall in love with each other against their respective families' wishes. After countless struggles, Mo Jia Qi is forced to leave with another man as Zhou Nian Zhong gives in to his step father's demand to an arranged marriage. Before she leaves, however, Mo Jia Qi gave Zhou Nian Zhong a green ruby necklace as a testament of their feelings for each other. Eventually, the necklace will reunite the feuding families once again, as Mo Jia Qi and Zhou Nian Zhong vow to be together, even in death. EMERALD ON THE ROOF is an emotional tale about true love against all odds.

== Plot summary ==
"During which part of our life did we miss the chance of our love?"

Nian Zhong meets Jia Qi, during his teens by accident and falls in love with her. Jia Qi, having the same feelings, plays a trick by putting one of her emerald necklaces into Nian Zhong's pocket. She believes that as long as she has the other pair of it and the other one kept with him, they will be forever in love as told by her father before he died. The only reason why Nian Zhong could not admit his feelings for her is because his best friend, Nie Kai liked her first. Soon after, his mother dies and he is forced to leave Hainan Island for Shanghai. Jia Qi is left heartbroken, assuming Nian Zhong never loved her.

Years have passed and fate, yet again brings them together. Nian Zhong and Jia Qi meet in the midst of the crowded streets of London. Both with bottled up feelings for each other, unable to confess to each other, one is hurt and the other is regret. Nian Zhong tries to reconcile with her, and soon confesses his love for her. Jia Qi unhesitatingly accepts his love, but their love does not last long. On the last day of their love Nian Zhong waited for Jia Qi all night, until the next day, and the following day but she never appeared again. Nian Zhong finds out that Jia Qi had died in a car accident afterwards.

Many years later, Nian Zhong returns to Hainan Island, he takes a position at a Hotel, and is now engage to be married to his fiancee Pei Yu (Yvonne Yao) that he brings with him to Hainan Island. But fates miserable tricks have yet again come into action, Nian Zhong meets Jia Qi again. She is now paralyze in a wheelchair and unable to walk. Jia Qi and her mother were both forced to leave London because of her mother's outstanding gambling debts on the day Nian Zhong had waited for her. Jia Qi refused to get on the plane and went to meet with Nian Zhong, on her way to see him the taxi she was riding in was involve in a traffic accident. Nian Zhong who still loves Jia Qi, breaks off his engagement to Pei Yu and runs back to Jia Qi. Jia Qi although reluctant she accepts him once again. Their parents and Pei Yu soon also learns to accept them. Right when everything is fine and they are about to be married, another tragedy strikes.

Jia Qi turns back to see the bustling scene in Hainan's airport once more, in her heart, she knows how much she loves Nian Zhong.

Nian Zhong walks along the shore and reminisce their past memories together, he takes out a necklace with an emerald on it from his pocket and smiles.

== Main cast ==
- Wallace Huo (霍建華) as Zhou Nian Zhong (周念中)

Zhou Nian Zhong lives in Hainan Island with his mother. He takes his best friend seat in music class. In music class everyone knows him as Nie Kai instead of Nian Zhong. But his fate twisted when he and best buddy fall in love with Jia Qi. Nian Zhong does not dare to show his love for Jia Qi because of Nie Kai. At the same time his mother sends him to Shanghai and told him that his biological mother is Mrs. Yang who lives in Shanghai. Nian Zhong starts a new life after his foster mother dies. Unhappy with his new life in Shanghai and having nothing to go back to in Hainan he ask his biological mother to send him to London to study.

- Betty Li Sun (孫儷) as Mo Jia Qi (莫家绮)

Mo Jia Qi mother remarries after her father dies. She loves Nian Zhong but they could not be together because of Nei Kai who also loves Jia Qi. She still thinks of Nian Zhong after he left Hainan Island. Jia Qi and her mother goes to London after her step father tries to molest her. In London she meets Nian Zhong again. When all seems she and Nian Zhong can finally be together her mother causes her to be separated from Nian Zhong again.

- George Hu (胡宇威) as Nie Kai (聂凯)

Nie Kai is Nian Zhong best friends. Both grew up together at Hainan Island. He loves martial arts and ask Nian Zhong to attend his music class in his name for him when his mother decides he should be taking music lessons instead of martial arts class. He meets Jia Qi when she ask if he could teach her martial arts. After he discover that Jia Qi is the pretty girl he saw in ballet class, he decided to pursue her. He ask Nian Zhong to help him write a love letter to Jia Qi, but Jia Qi actually likes Nian Zhong.

- Yvonne Yau (姚采穎) as Ling Pei Yu (凌佩妤)

Ling Pei Yu is Nian Zhong's rich step-father business associate's daughter. She meets him when he is sent to live with his biological mother in Shanghai. She takes a liking to him immediately but Nian Zhong pays no attention to her. She runs into Nian Zhong again in London where she takes him in as a roommate and falls in love with him. After finishing college they return to Shanghai together. Pei Yu lets her father know that she intends to marry Nian Zhong which he gives his blessing to because he wants Nian Zhong to help run his share of the restaurant/hotel in Hainan Island . Nian Zhong agrees to marry her thinking Jia Qi has died and seeing how much Pei Yu helped him during his struggles in London.

== Supporting cast ==
- Jia Nailiang (贾乃亮) as Tang Shi Jie (唐世杰)

Tang Qi Shan's son and Nian Zhong's step brother. He hates Nian Zhong because he likes Pei Yu but she likes Nian Zhong and not him. He also hates his step mother because he cannot get over the death of his mother.

- Zhang Guoli (張國立) as Tang Qi Shan (唐起山)

Nian Zhong's rich step-father and Nai Liang's father. Ling Xin Fu's business associate.

- Zhang Tielin (張鐵林) as Ling Xin Fu (凌信夫)

Pei Yu's father and Tang Qi Shan's business associate.

- Leanne Liu (劉雪華) as Liang Rui (梁蕊)

Mo Jia Qi's mother. Money is everything to her. In the beginning she tells Nian Zhong and Nie Kai to stay away from Jia Qi because of their poor background. She accepts Nian Zhong later on when he graduates from college and has a successful career. She also has a gambling problem that causes her to have debt with loan sharks.

- Pai Bing-bing (白冰冰) as Fang Min (方敏)

Nie Kai's mother. She is a cheerful and happy person that wants everyone around her to be happy.

- Wu Qian Qian (鄔倩倩) as Zhou Bi Xia (周碧霞)

Nian Zhong's biological mother. Tang Qi Shan's wife. Step son Tang Shi Jie hates her. She promised Nian Zhong that she would support his studies in London but backs out on helping him after her step son Shi Jie threatens her.

- Bai Xue (柏雪) as He Qing Zhu (何庆珠)

Works at the same restaurant/hotel that Nian Zhong runs. She works alongside Nie Kai and Yi Sheng at the restaurant/hotel. She shares a house with Jia Qi and her mother after they return to Hainan from London. Has a crush on Nian Zhong because of his kindness.

- Zhang Yi Sheng (張翊生) as Pang Xian (螃蟹)

Nie Kai High School friend. They apply to work at restaurant/hotel at the same time.

== Production team ==
- Producer:
  - Cui Bao Zhu 崔宝珠
- Director:
  - Wang Zi Ming 王子鳴
- Screenwriter:
  - Du Zheng Zhe 杜政哲
- Production Company :
  - Beijing Cultural Development Co., Ltd. Dong Wang 北京东王文化发展有限公司
  - Shanghai Film Group Corporation 上海电影集团公司
  - Beijing Cultural Development Co., Ltd. China Audiovisual Online 北京华夏视听在线文化发展有限公司

== Original soundtrack ==
Emerald On The Roof

Soundtrack album by Various artists
- Released: 6 October 2006
- Genre: Mandopop
- Language: Mandarin
- Label: Linfair Records / R2G Music

Emerald On The Roof Original Soundtrack (CD) (屋頂上的綠寶石 電視原聲帶) was released on October 6, 2006 by various artists under Linfair Records / R2G Music. It contains 10 songs, in which 6 songs are various instrumental versions of the songs. The opening theme is track 2 "Actually, I Really Love You 其實很愛你" by Angela Chang 張韶涵, while the closing theme is track 4 "One Memory 一個人彈琴" by Claire 郭靜.

=== Track listing ===
No.	Title	Singer(s)	Length
1.	"Emerald (Instrumental)" (綠寶石 Lu Bao Shi)	Linfair Orchestra 林隆璇	2:02
2.	"Actually, I Really Love You" (其實很愛你 Qi Shi Hen Ai Ni)	Angela Chang 張韶涵	4:03
3.	"Actually, I Really Love You (Flute Instrumental)" (其實很愛你 Qi Shi Hen Ai Ni)	Linfair Orchestra 林隆璇	3:01
4.	"One Memory" (一個人彈琴 Yi Ge Ren Tan Qin)	Claire 郭靜	4:42
5.	"Time (Brisk Jump Instrumental)" (時光 輕快跳躍版 Shi Guang)	Linfair Orchestra 林隆璇	1:38
6.	"Time" (時光 Shi Guang)	Claire 郭靜	4:14
7.	"At That Time (Fiery Tango Instrumental)" (那時候 火熱探戈版 Na Shi Hou)	Linfair Orchestra 林隆璇	2:25
8.	"Emerald (Piano & Strings Romantic Instrumental)" (綠寶石 鋼琴+弦樂浪漫版 Lu Bao Shi)	Linfair Orchestra 林隆璇	2:14
9.	"At That Time" (那時候 Na Shi Hou)	Kevin Lin 林隆璇	4:30
10.	"At That Time (Desperate Plaintive Instrumental)" (那時候 絕望悲淒版 Na Shi Hou)	Linfair Orchestra 林隆璇	2:22
