= Another Me (2022 film) =

- Theatrical release poster
- Chinese: 李茂换太子
- Hanyu Pinyin: Lǐ Mào huàn tàizǐ
- Directed by: Gao Ke (高可)
- Starring: Ma Li; Chang Yuan; Ai Lun; Wei Xiang (魏翔)
- Production company: New Classics Media
- Release date: 1 January 2022
- Country: China
- Language: Mandarin
- Box office: $80.8 million

Another Me (Chinese: 李茂换太子; pinyin: Lǐ Mào huàn tàizǐ; lit. 'Li Mao switches with the crown prince'; also known as Chinese: 李茂扮太子; pinyin: Lǐ Mào bàn tàizǐ; lit. 'Li Mao disguises himself as the crown prince') is a 2022 Chinese comedy film produced by New Classics Media. It was released on 1 January 2022 and stars Ma Li, Chang Yuan, Ai Lun, and Wei Xiang (魏翔).

== Premise ==
The film depicts a constable (捕快) named Li Mao who is married to Yang Jiazhen, a woman from a rich family, who unexpectedly discovers that he is the spitting image of the crown prince. Li Mao wants to go to the imperial palace to get a promotion, while the crown prince wishes to leave the palace and live freely. As a result, the two switch identities, but are drawn into the schemes of high officials.

== Cast ==
- Ma Li
- Chang Yuan
- Ai Lun
- Wei Xiang (魏翔)
- Wang Chengsi (王成思)
- Du Xiaoyu (杜晓宇)

== Release ==
The film was originally scheduled for release on 31 December 2021, but this was pushed back to 1 January 2022.

== Reception ==
Derek Elley wrote that though enjoyable, the film falls short of its potential as it "relies on pratfall comedy, wordplay, and cameo appearances...rather than a plot with real character development and architecture."
