= Once Upon a Time in the Northeast =

- Poster
- Chinese: 东北往事之破马张飞
- Directed by: Guo Dalei
- Starring: Jia Nailiang; Ma Li; Wang Xun; Liang Chao; Yu Yang; Qu Jingjing; Eric Tsang; Chin Shih-chieh
- Release date: 3 February 2017
- Running time: 1:39:00
- Country: China
- Language: Mandarin
- Box office: CN¥87.7 million

Once Upon a Time in the Northeast is a 2017 Chinese action comedy film directed by Guo Dalei and starring Jia Nailiang, Ma Li, Wang Xun, Liang Chao, Yu Yang, Qu Jingjing, Eric Tsang and Chin Shih-chieh. It was released in China on 3 February 2017.

== Cast ==
- Jia Nailiang
- Ma Li
- Wang Xun
- Liang Chao
- Yu Yang
- Qu Jingjing
- Eric Tsang
- Chin Shih-chieh

== Reception ==
The film grossed US$8.4 million on its opening weekend in China.
