= Hangzhou Zoo =

Zoo in Hangzhou

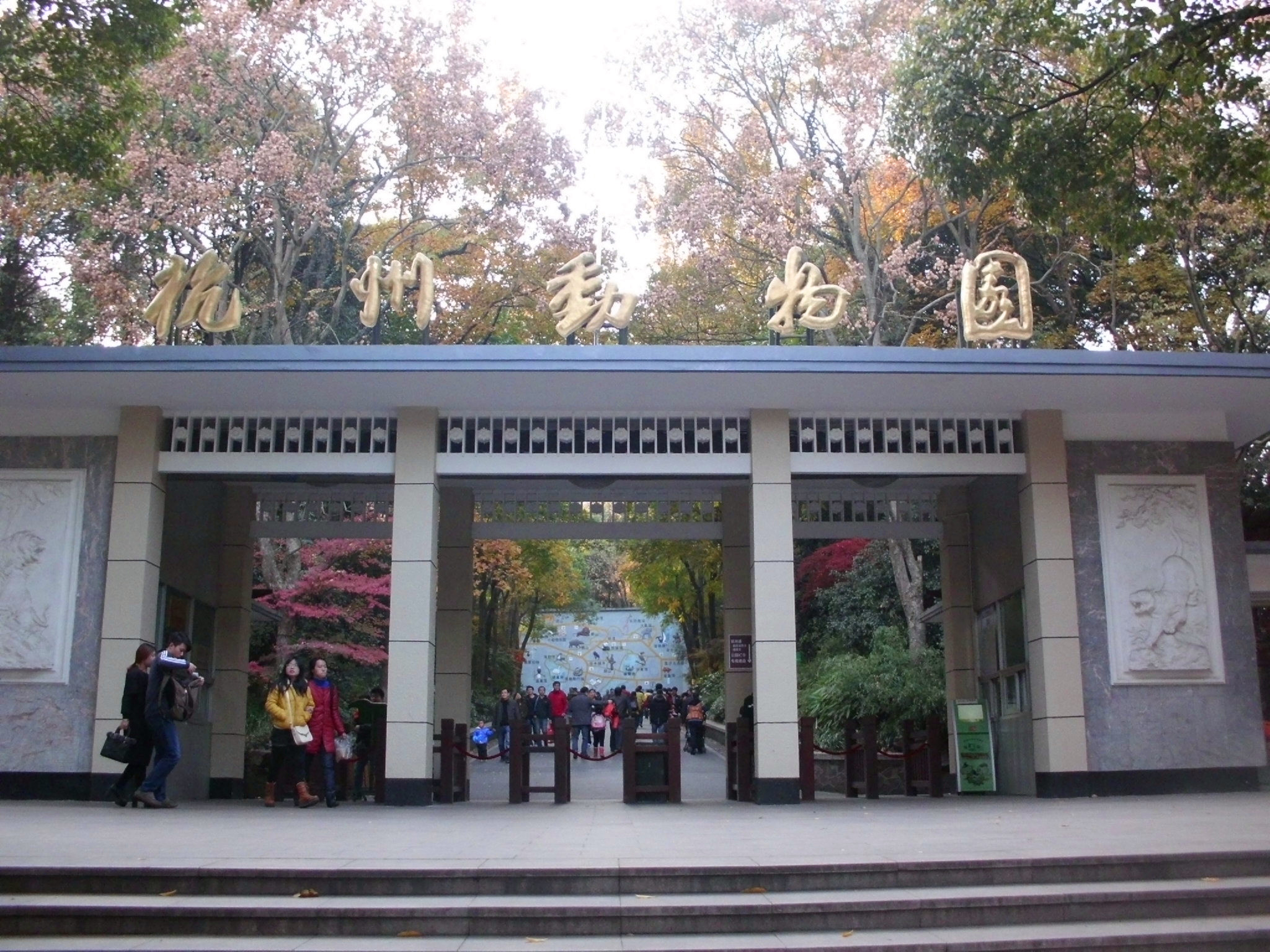
- Hangzhou Zoo entrance
- Interactive map of Hangzhou Zoo
- 30.2137°N 120.1337°E
- Date opened: 1958
- Location: 40 Hupao Rd, Xihu Qu, Hangzhou Shi, Zhejiang Sheng, China
- No. of animals: 1,000+
- No. of species: 120 kinds of rare wild animals
- Website: www.hzzoo.com

Hangzhou Zoo (Chinese: 杭州动物园; pinyin: Hángzhōu Dòngwùyuán) is a zoo located in Hangzhou, Zhejiang province, People's Republic of China.

== History ==
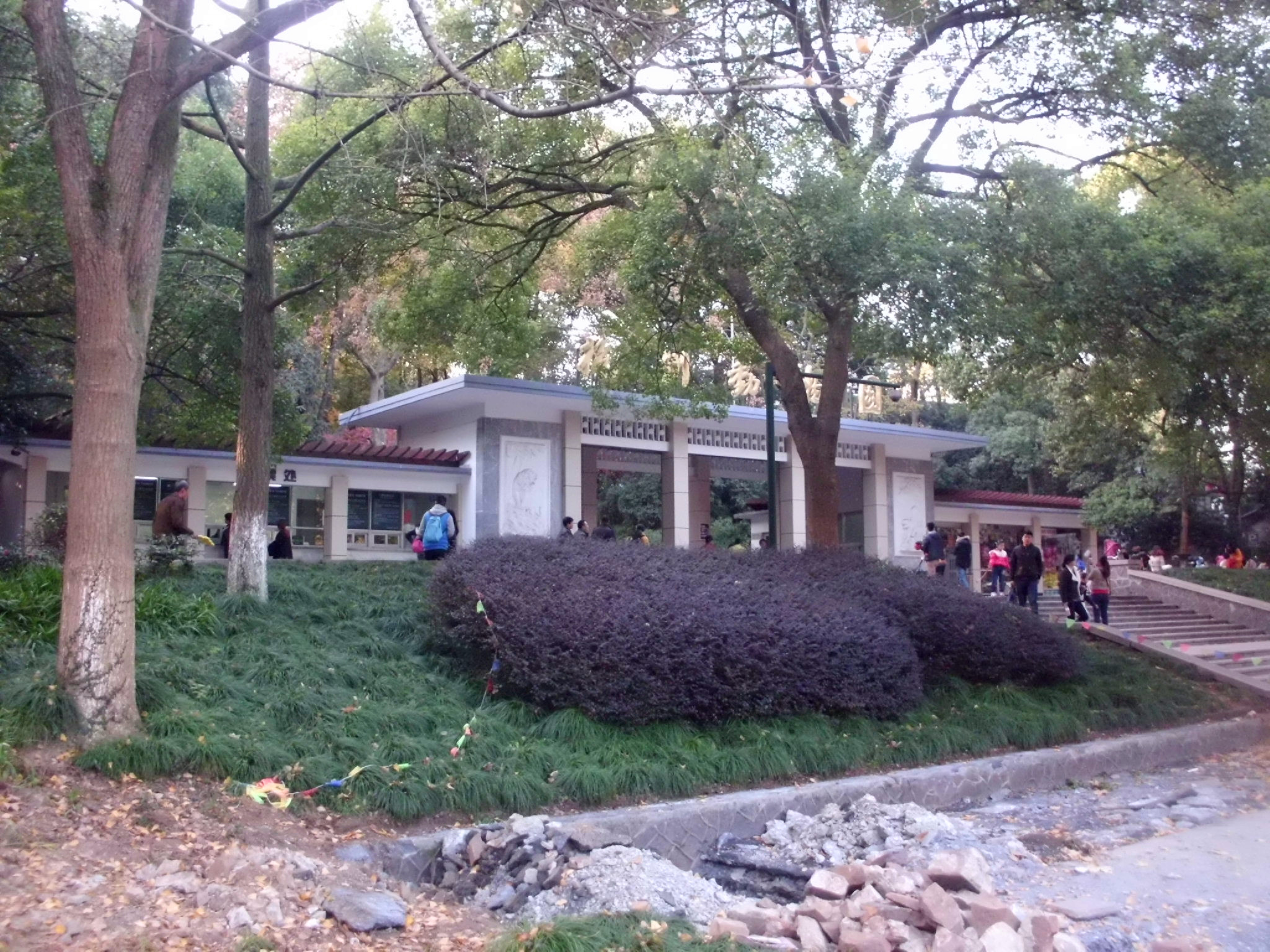
View of the zoo's entrance

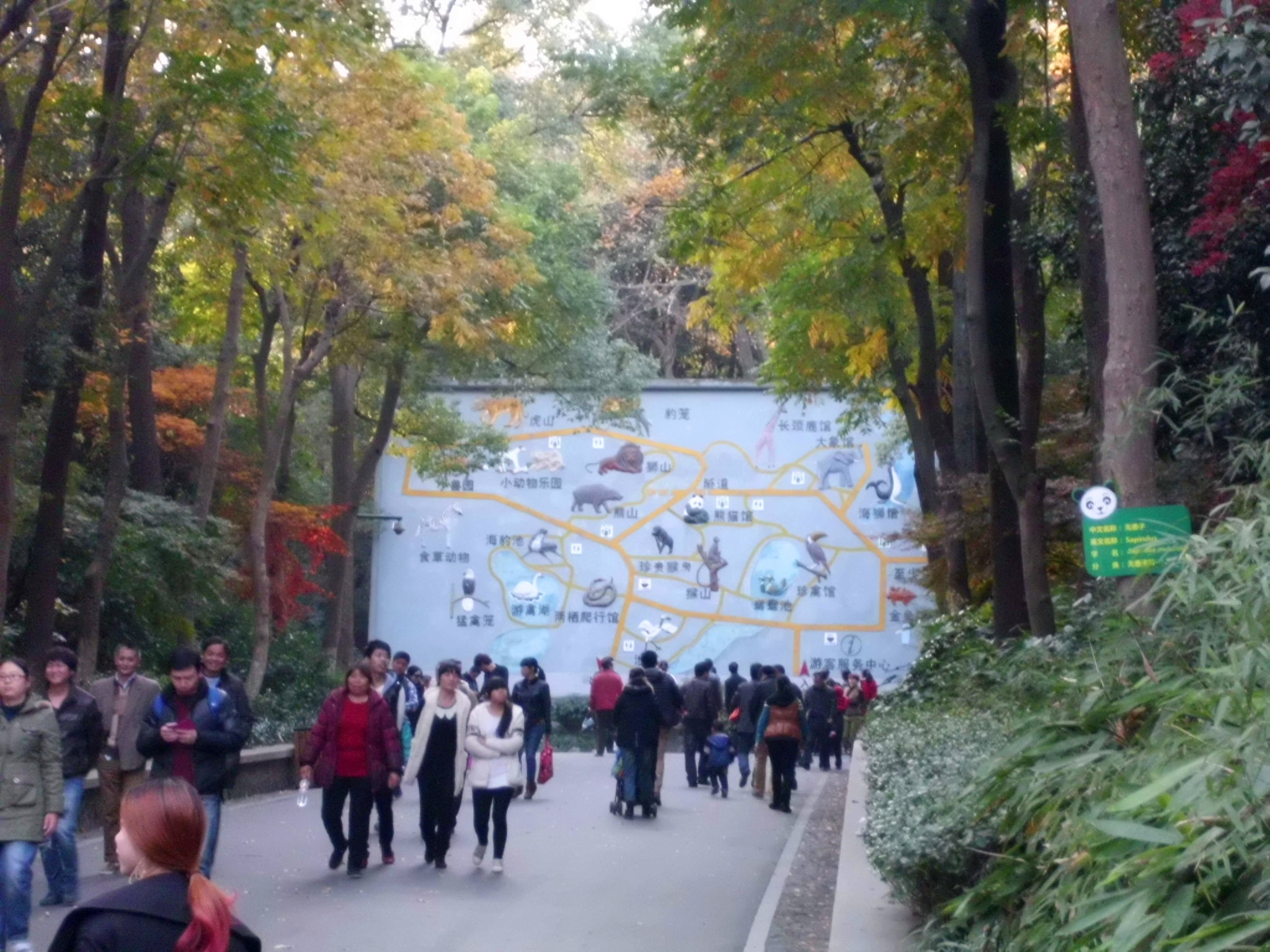
Walking path inside

Hangzhou Zoo was officially opened in 1958. In June 2020, the zoo went through organisational reforms and started co-operating with Hangzhou Children's Park. Today the two parks covers a total area of 440 acres and has 120 kinds of rare wild animals, and receives an annual attendance averaging at more than 2.3 million tourists.

=== Viral Sun bear video ===
In 2023, the zoo gained international interest after an online video posted on Douyin platform, had gone viral of 'Angela', one of its female Malaysian sun bears, that was seen standing up straight and waving its paw at the crowd. A number of internet users speculated that the bear was acting too much like a human and pointed out that the bear appeared to have saggy skin folds on its behind, which led to conspiracy theories that the female bear was actually a person inside a fake bear suit.

Hangzhou Zoo however denied this and stated that people "don't understand" the species. Additionally, multiple animal experts from western zoos, including Zoo Miami's animal expert Ron Magill and Canberra's National Zoo and Aquarium wildlife supervisor Sophie Dentrinos, later dismissed the conspiracy theories, and told reporters that they can tell that the bear in Hangzhou zoo was authentic, explaining that this bear species naturally has a lot of loose saggy skin as a natural adaptation against predators, and it wasn't odd for sun bears to be able to stand up straight on their hind legs.

After widespread reporting by major media outlets on the controversial video, Hangzhou Zoo soon experienced an increase in attendance numbers by 30% to about 20,000 a day, with some visitors reportedly travelling overnight to see its much-publicized sun bears.
