= Hayate the Combat Butler (2011 TV series) =

2011 Taiwanese television series

- Official promotional poster
- Genre: Teen drama Romance; Comedy
- Based on: Hayate the Combat Butler by Kenjiro Hata
- Directed by: Lim Tze-peng
- Starring: Park Shin-hye; George Hu; Tia Lee; Sean Lee; Wes Lo; Egin Lee
- Opening theme: Bie Wen Wo (別問我) by William Wei
- Ending theme: Dan Bian Er Ji (單邊耳機) by George Hu and Aggie
- Country of origin: Taiwan
- Original languages: Mandarin; Taiwanese Hokkien
- No. of episodes: 13

Production
- Production locations: Taiwan; Huis Ten Bosch, Japan
- Running time: 80 minutes
- Production companies: Gala Television; Formosa Television

Original release
- Network: FTV; GTV
- Release: June 19 – September 11, 2011

Related
- Love Together; In Time with You

Hayate the Combat Butler

Chinese name
- Traditional Chinese: 旋風管家
- Simplified Chinese: 旋风管家
- Literal meaning: "whirlwind butler"
Transcriptions
Standard Mandarin
- Hanyu Pinyin: Xuànfēng Guǎnjiā
- Wade–Giles: Hsüan-feng Guǎn-chia
Yue: Cantonese
- Yale Romanization: Syun4-fung1 Gun2-ga1
- Jyutping: Syun4-fung1 Gun2-ga1
Southern Min
- Hokkien POJ: Hoan-hong Koan-ga

Japanese name
- Kana: ハヤテのごとく
Transcriptions
- Romanization: Hayate no Gotoku

Hayate The Combat Butler (Chinese: 旋風管家) is a Taiwanese television drama based on the Japanese shōnen manga of the same name by Kenjiro Hata. It originally aired on the free-to-air channel FTV from June 19 to September 11, 2011, and on the cable channel GTV Variety Show from June 25 to September 17, 2011.

== Synopsis ==
"Xiao Sa" Ling Qisa is an unlucky teenager who worked since childhood to make ends meet due to his parents' irresponsible behavior. On that Christmas Day, he got fired from both his daytime and nighttime jobs, and also finds out that his parents were running from the mafia, leaving behind a massive gambling debt on his shoulders. They even collected his last pay from his nighttime job's boss to escape. While running away from the debt collectors, he ends up meeting Xiao Zhi. From his encounter with the mafia, they said that he didn't even have the guts to be a bad guy as he didn't dare pick up the knife and kill them (to relieve him of his debt). Hence, Xiao Sa thought that since being a filial son and good student didn't help him at all, he should just be a bad guy and kidnap a rich heir/heiress and demand ransom to pay off his debts. However, due to some misunderstandings, he ended up saving Xiao Zhi from a few thugs who tried to pick her up. Xiao Zhi thought that he was confessing as Xiao Sa said that he needed her (literally) when in fact he meant that he needed her to agree to him kidnapping her. However, as he went to call Xiao Zhi's family to demand ransom, he backed out at the last moment. During the process, kidnappers came and captured Xiao Zhi while Xiao Sa was away making the call. Xiao Sa then risked his life to save her, and Xiao Zhi ended up hiring him as her butler, and slowly fell in love with him; not always noticing how much he influenced her and how she overcame many of her fears with his help.

Aside from performing his ordinary duties as a butler, Xiao Sa must fight to protect Xiao Zhi from harm - a difficult task since her life is always in danger as she is the target of other individuals coveting her family's fortune - and sometimes deal with some extravagant requests from her, oblivious to Xiao Zhi's true feelings for him. In the later part of the story, Xiao Sa has to deal with other issues that come his way, many of which ends up with some comedic scenes, also romantic ones where Xiao Sa gave encouragement to Xiao Zhi about her dream of drawing manga, and his unknowing care for her along with his unbending loyalty towards her. Xiao Sa's debt was eventually paid by Xiao Zhi, and he vows to serve her with his life. As the story progresses, Xiao Sa also had to deal with some of his past, and of course, competition with other guys who were in love with Xiao Zhi - some of which have their own charm.

== Cast ==
Actor	Character	Manga character
George Hu	Xiao Sa / Ling Qisa (小颯 / 凌奇颯)	Hayate Ayasaki
Park Shin-hye (voiced by: He Yipei)	Xiao Zhi / Sanqianyuan Zhi (小芷 / 三千院芷)	Nagui Sanzenin
Tia Li	Maria (瑪莉亞)	Maria <-> Athena Tennousu
Egin Lee	Gui Chuju (桂雛菊)	Hinagiku Katsura <-> Ayumu Nishizawa
Sean Lee	Ju Xuan (鞠宣)	Wataru Tachibana
Wes Lo	Duanmu Zeyu (端木澤語)	Isumi Saginomiya
Tang Guozhong	Ji Shen (季神)	Akane Himegami
Ma Shili	Auntie Shasha (莎莎姨)	Saki Kijima
Tao Chuanzheng	Mr. Di / Sanqianyuan Di (帝老爺 / 三千院帝)	Mikado Sanzenin
Zhu Degang	Ke Laofu (柯老夫)	Seishirou Klaus
Yang Qi	Gui Xuelu (桂雪鷺)	Yukiji Katsura
King Chin	Jin Zhijie (金之介)	Kyonosuke Kaoru
Lin Boyan	Yuan Yefeng (袁也楓)	Kaede Nonohara
Frankie Huang	Kang Tailang (康太郎)	Koutarou Azumamiya
Edwin Gerard	Murong Bingshi (慕容兵侍)	Himuro Saeki
Zeng Ziyu	He Dahe (何大河)	Taiga Ookouchi
Fang Zhiyou	Meixi (美希)	Miki Hanabishi

== Music ==
- Opening theme song: "別問我" (Don't Ask Me)

Performed by 韋禮安 (William Wei)
Lyrics by: 韋禮安 (William Wei)
Composed by: 韋禮安 (William Wei)

- Ending theme song: "單邊耳機" (One Sided Earphone)

Performed by 胡宇崴 (George Hu) & Aggie Xie
Lyrics by: 葉樹賢 (Ye Shu Xian)
Composed by: 易桀齊 (Yi Jie Qi)

Insert songs

- "Turn Around"

Performed by Shirley
Lyrics by: 戴蕙心 (Dai Hu Xin)
Composed by: 戴蕙心 (Dai Hu Xin)

- "夜" (Night)

Performed by 曾静玟 (Zeng Jing Wen)
Lyrics by: 林蔚利 (Lin Wei Li)
Composed by: 李華章 (Lee Hua Chang)

== Broadcast ==
Country/Region	Channel	Timeslot	Episode premiere	Episode finale	Avg rating
Taiwan	FTV	Sunday 21:40	June 19, 2011	September 11, 2011	1.14
Taiwan	GTV	Saturday 22:30	June 25, 2011	September 17, 2011	-
Singapore	E City	Monday–Friday 22:00	September 1, 2011	-	-
Malaysia	Shuang Xing	Monday–Friday 22:30	October 10, 2011	-	-
Hong Kong	TVB Drama	Sunday 19:30	October 30, 2011	-	-
South Korea	DRAMAcube	Friday 22:00	December 2, 2011	-	-
Japan	DATV	Monday–Friday 22:00	October 6, 2014	-	-
Thailand	Channel 7	Saturday–Sunday 02:00	January 11, 2015	-	-

== Reception ==
Formosa Television (FTV) (民視) Ratings
Episode	Original Broadcast Date	Average	Rank	Remarks
1	19 June 2011	1.28	3	
2	26 June 2011	1.38	3	
3	3 July 2011	1.38	3	
4	10 July 2011	1.28	3	
5	17 July 2011	1.12	3	
6	24 July 2011	0.96	3	
7	31 July 2011	1.04	3	
8	7 August 2011	1.12	3	
9	14 August 2011	0.88	3	
10	21 August 2011	1.20	3	
11	28 August 2011	1.28	3	CTV Love Keeps Going series finale
12	4 September 2011	0.86	2	
13	11 September 2011	1.04	2	
Average		1.14	-	-
