= List of highest-grossing non-English films =

These are the highest-grossing, primarily non-English language films in the world. Mandarin is the most frequent language with 38 films in the top-50 highest grossing non-English films, while Japanese is the second most frequent language with 7 films in the top 50.

== Film and language ==
In terms of gross revenue, English-language films are vastly over-represented among the highest-grossing films of all time. Among the top 100 highest-grossing films, 97 of them are in English, with the other three being the Chinese films Ne Zha 2, The Battle at Lake Changjin and Wolf Warrior 2.

One factor behind the relatively high gross revenue of English-language films is because of the function of the English language as the world's lingua franca. It is the first language of 400 million people, the second language of another 400 million, and a foreign language of an additional 700 million. It is thus understood by 1.5 billion people, which is almost 20% of the world population. The Chinese language, especially the standard variant, has over twice as many native speakers as English, but much fewer foreign-language speakers.

Another major factor is the difference in cinema box office ticket prices around the world, with developing countries and newly industrialized countries having lower ticket prices than developed countries, due to lower currency value, less average income and lower living costs. A number of Chinese, Indian and Soviet films sold more than 100 million tickets at the box office, but at relatively low ticket prices compared to Hollywood films and thus limiting the amount of gross revenue generated. Up until the 1990s, US and UK ticket prices were significantly greater than Chinese, Indian and Soviet ticket prices. (Note: See Film industry § Average ticket price.) As of 2017, the average cinema ticket price was $9 in the United States, compared to CN¥35 ($5.10) in China and ₹134.38 ($2.06) in India.

== Highest-grossing films by box office revenue ==
† indicates films playing in the week commencing 6 November 2026 in theaters around the world.

Top 50 highest-grossing films that are not primarily in the English language
Rank	English title (Note: This is the title of the film in English, however defined. This is usually decided by the film studio itself or by critical consensus. Sometimes, the name is identical to the original name of the film.)	Original title	Primary language(s) (Note: If multiple languages are spoken in the film, this specifies the main/most common language. If two or more common languages are spoken, all such languages are specified.)	Country of origin	Worldwide gross (in US$)	Year	Ref
1	Ne Zha 2	哪吒之魔童闹海	Mandarin	China	$2,217,758,382	2025	
2	The Battle at Lake Changjin	长津湖	Mandarin	China	$913,540,914	2021	
3	Wolf Warrior 2	战狼2	Mandarin	China	$870,325,439	2017	
4	Hi, Mom	你好，李焕英	Mandarin	China	$841,674,419	2021	
5	Demon Slayer: Infinity Castle	劇場版「鬼滅の刃」無限城編	Japanese	Japan	$800,413,549	2025	
6	Ne Zha	哪吒之魔童降世	Mandarin	China	$742,718,496	2019	
7	The Wandering Earth	流浪地球	Mandarin	China	$699,992,512	2019	
8	Detective Chinatown 3	唐人街探案3	Mandarin	China	$686,257,563	2021	
9	Full River Red	满江红	Mandarin	China	$673,552,250	2023	
10	Pegasus 3	飞驰人生3	Mandarin	China	$656,459,523	2026	
11	The Battle at Lake Changjin II	长津湖之水门桥	Mandarin	China	$626,571,697	2022	
12	The Wandering Earth 2	流浪地球2	Mandarin	China	$615,023,132	2023	
13	The Passion of the Christ	The Passion of the Christ	Aramaic; Latin; Hebrew	United States	$612,054,506	2004	
14	Operation Red Sea	红海行动	Mandarin; Arabic	China	$579,330,426	2018	
15	The Mermaid	美人鱼	Mandarin	China; Hong Kong	$553,810,228	2016	
16	Detective Chinatown 2	唐人街探案2	Mandarin	China	$544,185,156	2018	
17	No More Bets	孤注一掷	Mandarin	China	$541,001,696	2023	
18	Demon Slayer: Mugen Train	劇場版「鬼滅の刃」 無限列車編	Japanese	Japan	$512,704,063	2020	
19	Detective Chinatown 1900	唐探1900	Mandarin	China	$508,922,947	2025	
20	Lost in the Stars	消失的她	Mandarin; Thai	China	$488,719,815	2023	
21	YOLO	热辣滚烫	Mandarin	China	$479,597,304	2024	
22	Successor	抓娃娃	Mandarin	China	$469,612,890	2024	
23	Pegasus 2	飞驰人生2	Mandarin	China	$468,905,664	2024	
24	The Eight Hundred	八佰	Mandarin	China	$461,421,559	2020	
25	Moon Man	独行月球	Mandarin	China	$460,300,583	2022	
26	Dying to Survive	我不是药神	Mandarin	China	$451,176,639	2018	
27	My People, My Country	我和我的祖国	Mandarin	China	$450,064,993	2019	
28	My People, My Homeland	我和我的家乡	Mandarin	China	$433,241,288	2020	
29	The Intouchables	Intouchables	French	France	$426,588,510	2011	
30	Dead to Rights	南京照相馆	Mandarin	China	$422,785,908	2025	
31	The Captain	中国机长	Mandarin	China	$417,282,021	2019	
32	Too Cool to Kill	这个杀手不太冷静	Mandarin	China	$413,000,000	2022	
33	Your Name	君の名は。	Japanese	Japan	$405,349,022	2016	
34	Spirited Away	千と千尋の神隠し	Japanese	Japan	$395,580,000	2001	(Note: Spirited Away box office revenue: Japan – ¥30.8 billion ($253,440,854); China – $70,675,329; Outside of Japan and China – $41,368,351; United States and Canada – $12,427,717 (30 October 2018); South Korea – $11,382,770 (15 August 2002); France – $6,326,294 (26 June 2002); Other territories – $11,231,570)
35	Monster Hunt	捉妖記	Mandarin	China; Hong Kong	$387,053,506	2015	
36	Once Upon a Time in the Middle East †	欢迎来龙餐馆 مرحبًا بكم في مطعمِ التنينِ	Mandarin; Arabic	China	$373,000,000	2026	
37	Hello Mr. Billionaire	西虹市首富	Mandarin	China	$366,961,907	2018	
38	Monster Hunt 2	捉妖记2	Mandarin	China	$361,682,618	2018	
39	Kung Fu Soccer	功夫女足	Mandarin	China	$351,088,024	2026	
40	Dangal	दंगल	Hindi	India	$340,000,000	2016	
41	Article 20	第二十条	Mandarin	China	$337,554,287	2024	
42	Never Say Die	羞羞的铁拳	Mandarin	China	$334,530,869	2017	
43	Crazy Alien	疯狂的外星人	Mandarin	China	$327,598,891	2019	
44	Suzume	すずめの戸締まり	Japanese	Japan	$324,185,200	2022	
45	All Wishes Come True!	八仙!	Mandarin	China	$307,784,556	2026	
46	The Ex-File 3: The Return of the Exes	前任3：再见前任	Mandarin	China	$307,592,427	2017	
47	The Boy and the Heron	君たちはどう生きるか	Japanese	Japan	$304,900,000	2023	
48	Never Say Never	八角笼中	Mandarin	China	$304,280,699	2023	
49	Mulan	花木兰	Mandarin	China	$304,000,000	2009	
50	Dear You	给阿嬷的情书	Teochew	China	$297,810,000	2026	

== Box office admissions ==
A number of non-English markets have traditionally given box office figures in ticket sales (such as France, South Korea and the Soviet Union), rather than gross revenue, thus only ticket sales numbers are available for a number of older non-English films in various markets. This list varies from revenue-based rankings due to the huge difference in the price of admission tickets from place to place as well as from one moment in time to another.

The following table lists known estimated box office ticket sales for various high-grossing non-English films that have sold at least 100 million tickets worldwide.

Note: Some of the data are incomplete due to a lack of available admissions data from a number of countries. Therefore, it is not an exhaustive list of all the highest-grossing non-English films by ticket sales, so no rankings are given.

Films that are estimated to have sold at least 100 million tickets and are not primarily in the English language
English title	Original title	Primary language(s)	Country of origin	Tickets sold (est.)	Year	Notes
Legend of the White Snake	白蛇传	Mandarin	China	700 million	1980	
In-Laws (Full House of Joy)	喜盈门	Mandarin	China	650 million	1981	
Wudang (The Undaunted Wudang)	武当	Mandarin	China	610 million	1983	
Gunshots in the CIB	保密局的枪声	Mandarin	China	600 million	1979	
Murder in 405	405谋杀案	Mandarin	China	600 million	1980	
The Disciple of the Shaolin Temple (The Shaolin Brothers)	少林寺弟子	Mandarin	China; Hong Kong	520 million	1983	
Shaolin Temple	少林寺	Mandarin	China; Hong Kong	505 million	1982	(Note: Shaolin Temple admissions: China – 500,000,000; Hong Kong – 700,000; Japan – 3,925,538; Seoul City (South Korea) – 294,065)
Sesame Official	七品芝麻官	Mandarin	China	500 million	1980	
Deadly Fury (Pride's Deadly Fury)	武林志	Mandarin	China	500 million	1984	
Cong Nu Li Dao Jiang Jun	从奴隶到将军	Mandarin	China	470 million	1979	
The Xi'an Incident	西安事变	Mandarin	China	450 million	1981	
Manhunt	君よ憤怒の河を渉れ	Japanese	Japan	434 million	1976	(Note: Kimi yo Fundo no Kawa o Watare (Manhunt) ticket sales and gross revenue: Japan – ¥240 million rentals – 720,000 tickets – ¥620 million ($2 million) gross receipts; China – 400,000,000 tickets – $52 million; Soviet Union – 33,700,000 tickets – $16 million)
Mysterious Buddha	神秘的大佛	Mandarin	China	400 million	1980	
Ji Hongchang	吉鸿昌	Mandarin	China	380 million	1979	
Kai Qiang, Wei Ta Song Xing	开枪,为他送行	Mandarin	China	330 million	1982	
Ne Zha 2	哪吒之魔童闹海	Mandarin	China	328 million	2025	(Note: Ne Zha 2 admissions: China – 325,000,000; United States – 2,062,000; United Kingdom – 140,000; Russia – 171,374; France – 62,375; Germany – 46,336; Spain – 39,673; Italy – 22,315; Brazil – 19,469; Austria – 3,952)
Caravan	कारवाँ; کاروان	Hindustani	India	319 million	1971	(Note: Caravan admissions: India – 19 million; China – 300 million)
Tunnel War	地道战	Mandarin	China	300 million	1965	
Du Shiniang	杜十娘	Mandarin	China	260 million	1981	
A General Wearing the Sword (Pei jian jiang jun)	佩剑将军	Mandarin	China	260 million	1983	
Little Heroes (Young Heroes)	自古英雄出少年	Mandarin	China; Hong Kong	260 million	1983	
Sholay (Embers)	शोले; شعلے	Hindustani	India	250 million	1975	
The Burning of Imperial Palace	火烧圆明园	Mandarin	China; Hong Kong	240 million	1983	
Awaara (The Vagabond)	आवारा; آوارہ	Hindustani	India	217 million	1951	(Note: Awaara admissions: India – 17 million; China – 100 million; Soviet Union – 100 million; Turkey – 100,000 (opening))
Holy Robe of the Shaolin Temple	木棉袈裟	Mandarin	Hong Kong	200 million	1985	
Fei lai de nü xu (Son-in-Law Flew Out of Nowhere)	飞来的女婿	Mandarin	China	199 million	1982	
Lan dun bao xian xiang (Blue Shield Safe)	蓝盾保险箱	Mandarin	China	170 million	1983	
Juvenile Delinquents (Innocent Teenagers)	少年犯	Mandarin	China; Hong Kong	161 million	1985	
Wolf Warrior 2	战狼2	Mandarin	China	160 million	2017	(Note: Wolf Warrior 2 admissions: China – 160,000,000; United States and Canada – 304,700; United Kingdom – 12,967; Germany – 3,358; South Korea – 1,248)
Baahubali 2: The Conclusion	బాహుబలి 2: ది కన్ క్లూజన్	Telugu	India	150 million	2017	
Mother India	मदर इण्डिया; مدر انڈیا	Hindustani	India	150 million	1957	
Mughal-e-Azam (The Great Mughal)	मुग़ल-ए-आज़म; مغل اعظم	Hindi; Urdu	India	150 million	1960	
Romance on Lushan Mountain	庐山恋	Mandarin	China	140 million	1980	
The Red Snowball Tree	Калина красная	Russian	Soviet Union	140 million	1974	
Dangal	दंगल	Hindi	India	140 million	2016	
Ne Zha	哪吒之魔童降世	Mandarin	China	140 million	2019	
Disco Dancer	डिस्को डांसर; ڈسکو رقاصہ	Hindustani	India	135 million	1982	(Note: Disco Dancer admissions: India – 15 million; Soviet Union – 120 million)
Zorro	Zorro	French	Italy	133 million	1975	(Note: Zorro: China – 70,000,000; Soviet Union – 55,300,000; Italy – 4,900,000; France – 1,218,320; Spain – 1,013,104; Germany – 582 573; Denmark – 36,127)
A Policeman with a Special Identity	特殊身份的警官	Mandarin	China	130 million	1982	
The Battle at Lake Changjin	长津湖	Mandarin	China	125 million	2021	
Hi, Mom	你好，李焕英	Mandarin	China	121 million	2021	
Great Shanghai 1937	大上海1937	Mandarin	China; Hong Kong	121 million	1986	
At Middle Age	人到中年	Mandarin	China	120 million	1982	
She an	蛇案	Mandarin	China	120 million	1983	
Bobby	बॉबी; بابی	Hindustani	India	116 million	1973	(Note: Bobby admissions: India – 53.5 million; Soviet Union – 62.9 million)
Mirage (Hai shi shen lou)	海市蜃楼	Mandarin	China; Hong Kong	113 million	1987	
Our Niu Baisui	咱们的牛百岁	Mandarin	China	110 million	1983	
The Wandering Earth	流浪地球	Mandarin	China	106 million	2019	(Note: The Wandering Earth admissions: China – 105,314,500; 105 million tickets for original release. 314,500 tickets for The Wandering Earth: Beyond 2020 Special Edition.; United States and Canada – 650,600)
The Glacier Fox	キタキツネ物語	Japanese	Japan	102 million	1978	
The War at Sea from Hawaii to Malaya	ハワイ・マレー沖海戦	Japanese	Japan	100 million	1943	
Amphibian Man	Человек-амфибия	Russian	Soviet Union	100 million	1962	
Sandakan No. 8	サンダカン八番娼館 望郷	Japanese	Japan	100 million	1974	
Dong fang jian	东方剑	Mandarin	China	100 million	1982	
Zhou Enlai	周恩來	Mandarin	China	100 million	1992	

== Home video sales revenue ==
The following table lists known home video sales for various high-grossing non-English films. Note that this list is incomplete and is thus not necessarily representative of the highest-grossing non-English films by video sales, therefore no rankings are given.

English title	Original title	Primary language	Country of origin	Video sales revenue (est.)	Year	Ref
Spirited Away	千と千尋の神隠し	Japanese	Japan	$324 million	2001	
Princess Mononoke	もののけ姫	Japanese	Japan	$260 million	1997	(Note: See Princess Mononoke § Home media and other releases)
My Neighbour Totoro	となりのトトロ	Japanese	Japan	$250 million	1988	
Final Fantasy VII: Advent Children	ファイナルファンタジーVII アドベントチルドレン	Japanese	Japan	$249 million	2005	(Note: Final Fantasy VII: Advent Children video sales – ¥19,884,421,500 ($249 million): Final Fantasy VII: Advent Children (DVD & UMD) – ¥17,280 million; Final Fantasy VII: Advent Pieces (DVD) – ¥2,294,421,500; Final Fantasy VII: Advent Children Complete (Blu-ray) – ¥310 million (Japan))
Howl's Moving Castle	ハウルの動く城	Japanese	Japan	$167 million	2004	
Pokémon: The First Movie	劇場版ポケットモンスター ミュウツーの逆襲	Japanese	Japan	$140 million	1999	
Nausicaä of the Valley of the Wind	風の谷のナウシカ	Japanese	Japan	$102 million	1984	
Castle in the Sky	天空の城ラピュタ	Japanese	Japan	$100 million	1986	(Note: See Castle in the Sky § Home media)
Parasite	기생충	Korean	South Korea	$90 million	2019	
Akira	アキラ	Japanese	Japan	$80 million	1988	
Demon Slayer: Mugen Train	劇場版「鬼滅の刃」 無限列車編	Japanese	Japan	$68 million	2020	
Resident Evil: Degeneration	バイオハザード：ディジェネレーション	Japanese	Japan	$76 million	2008	(Note: See Resident Evil: Degeneration § Home media)
Your Name	君の名は。	Japanese	Japan	$41 million	2016	

== Highest-grossing openings ==
The following is a list of the top 20 highest-grossing openings for non-English films. Since films do not open on Fridays in many markets, the 'opening' is taken to be the gross between the first day of release and the first Sunday following the film's release.

Rank	Film	Year	Opening	Primary language(s)	Country of origin	Ref
1	Ne Zha 2	2025	$431,280,000	Mandarin	China	
2	Detective Chinatown 3	2021	$398,000,000	Mandarin	China	
3	The Battle at Lake Changjin II (Water Gate Bridge)	2022	$398,000,000	Mandarin	China	
4	Pegasus 3	2026	$379,070,000	Mandarin	China	
5	The Wandering Earth	2019	$298,110,095	Mandarin	China	
6	The Mermaid	2016	$274,049,983	Mandarin	China, Hong Kong	
7	The Captain	2019	$251,966,468	Mandarin	China	
8	Detective Chinatown 1900	2025	$250,000,000	Mandarin	China	
9	The Battle at Lake Changjin	2021	$235,000,000	Mandarin	China	
10	Too Cool to Kill	2022	$217,000,000	Mandarin	China	
11	Crazy Alien	2019	$214,749,033	Mandarin	China	
12	Dying to Survive	2018	$200,837,145	Mandarin	China	
13	Hi, Mom	2021	$195,000,000	Mandarin	China	
14	Monster Hunt 2	2018	$189,784,760	Mandarin	China, Hong Kong	(Note: According to EntGroup, Monster Hunt 2 grossed CN¥1,204,450,000 between the first Friday and Sunday of its release in China in February 2018. According to the 2018 exchange rate during the weekend of release, this is equivalent to $189,784,760.)
15	No More Bets	2023	$181,060,000	Mandarin	China	
16	Evil Unbound	2025	$170,400,000	Mandarin	China	
17	My People, My Homeland	2020	$157,500,000	Mandarin	China	
18	Detective Chinatown 2	2018	$156,069,583	Mandarin	China	(Note: According to EntGroup, Detective Chinatown 2 grossed CN¥990,480,000 between the first Friday and Sunday of its release in China in February 2018. According to the 2018 exchange rate during the weekend of release, this is equivalent to $156,069,583.)
19	Pegasus	2019	$154,451,898	Mandarin	China	
20	Jiang Ziya (Legend of Deification)	2020	$151,700,000	Mandarin	China	

== Highest-grossing films by year ==
Highest-grossing non-English films by year of release
Year	Title	Box office (est.)		Budget	Language	Country	Ref
Year	Title	Revenue	Tickets	Budget	Language	Country	Ref
1939	The Fighters	?	27.1 million	?	Russian	Soviet Union	
1940	Zindagi (The Life)	$1.58 million	11 million	?	Hindustani	British India	(Note: ₹5.5 million (US$1.58 million) (Note: 3.4804 Indian rupees per US dollar in 1940: ₹13.33 per pound, $3.83 per pound) in 1940)
1941	Khazanchi (Cashier)	$2.12 million	30 million	?	Hindustani	British India	(Note: ₹7 million (US$2.12 million) (Note: 3.3077 Indian rupees per US dollar in 1941 and 1942: ₹13.33 per pound, $4.03 per pound) in 1941)
1942	Basant (Spring)	$2.42 million	30 million	?	Hindustani	British India	(Note: ₹8 million (US$2.42 million) in 1942)
1943	The War at Sea from Hawaii to Malaya	$17 million	100 million	$380,000	Japanese	Japan	
1944	Rattan	$3.03 million	35 million	?	Hindustani	British India	(Note: ₹10 million (US$3.03 million) (Note: 3.302 Indian rupees per US dollar from in 1944 and 1945) in 1944)
1945	Guilty Without Guilt	$8 million	28.9 million	?	Russian	Soviet Union	
1946	Anmol Ghadi (Precious Moment)	$3.02 million	32.5 million	?	Hindustani	British India	(Note: ₹10 million (US$3.02 million) (Note: 3.309 Indian rupees per US dollar in 1946) in 1946)
1947	Jugnu (Firefly)	$5 million	10 million	?	Hindustani	British India	(Note: ₹5 million (US$5 million) (Note: 1 Indian rupee per US dollar in 1947) in 1947)
1948	The Young Guard	$11.9 million	42.4 million	?	Russian	Soviet Union	
1949	Barsaat	$4 million	30 million	?	Hindustani	India	(Note: ₹20 million (US$4 million) (Note: 4.79 Indian rupees per US dollar from 1948 to 1950) in 1949)
1950	Brave People	$11.5 million	41.2 million	?	Russian	Soviet Union	
1951	Awaara (The Vagabond)	$30.7 million	217 million	?	Hindustani	India	(Note: See Awaara § Box office)
1952	Aan (The Savage Princess)	$6.04 million	30 million	$740,000	Hindustani	India	(Note: See Aan § Box office) (Note: Aan budget: ₹3.5 million ($740,000) (Note: 4.7619 Indian rupees per US dollar from 1951 to 1965))
1953	Lyubov Yarovaya	$13 million	46.4 million	?	Russian	Soviet Union	
1954	Godzilla	$20.6 million	40 million	$270,000	Japanese	Japan	(Note: Godzilla (1954) gross: Until 1980 – $20 million; 2004-2014 – $562,711) (Note: Godzilla (1954) budget: Japanese – ¥62,893,455 ($170,000); American – $100,000)
1955	Pather Panchali	$21 million	?	$42,000	Bengali	India	
1955	Shree 420 (Mrs. 420)	$10.4 million	70 million	?	Hindustani	India	(Note: See Shree 420 § Box office)
1956	Carnival Night	$12.8 million	45.6 million	?	Russian	Soviet Union	
1957	Mother India	$17 million	150 million	$1.3 million	Hindustani	India	(Note: Mother India: Gross revenue – ₹80 million ($17 million); Budget – ₹6 million ($1.3 million) (Note: The exchange rate in 1957 was 4.762 Indian rupees (₹) per 1 US dollar (US$).))
1958	Madhumati	$8.4 million	30 million	$1.7 million	Hindustani	India	(Note: Madhumati: Gross – ₹40 million ($8.4 million); Budget – ₹8.1 million ($740,000)) (Note: See List of highest-grossing films in India § Footfalls.)
1958	Hercules	$5 million	66.6 million	$2 million	Italian	Italy	(Note: See Hercules (1958 film) § Box office)
1959	Char Dil Char Rahen (Four Hearts, Four Roads)	$11.1 million	39.8 million	?	Hindustani	India	(Note: See Char Dil Char Rahen § Box office)
1960	Mughal-e-Azam (The Great Mughal)	$23.1 million	150 million	$3 million	Hindi; Urdu	India	
1961	Ganga Jamna	$23.6 million	84 million	?	Awadhi; Hindustani	India	(Note: See Ganga Jamna § Box office) (Note: Ganga Jamna admissions: India – 52 million; Soviet Union – 32.1 million)
1962	Treasure of Silver Lake	$29 million	51.5 million	?	German	West Germany; Yugoslavia	(Note: See Treasure of Silver Lake § Box office)
1962	Amphibian Man	$28 million	100 million	?	Russian	Soviet Union	
1963	Apache Gold (Winnetou the Warrior)	$36.7 million	78.1 million	?	German	West Germany; Italy; Yugoslavia	(Note: See Apache Gold § Box office)
1964	The Black Tulip	$35.9 million	85.3 million	?	French	France; Italy; Spain	(Note: See The Black Tulip (1964 film) § Reception)
1965	Tunnel War	$39 million	300 million	?	Mandarin	China	
1966	The Good, the Bad and the Ugly	$38.9 million	44.4 million	$1.2 million	Italian; Spanish	Italy	(Note: See Dollars Trilogy § Box office performance)
1966	War and Peace (Part I and Part II)	$26 million	94.5 million	?	Russian	Soviet Union	
1967	Kidnapping, Caucasian Style	$21.3 million	76.5 million	?	Russian	Soviet Union	(Note: See 1967 in film § Highest-grossing films.)
1968	Destroy All Monsters	$20 million	14 million	$560,000	Japanese	Japan	
1968	The Shield and the Sword	$19 million	68.3 million	?	Russian	Soviet Union	
1969	Aradhana	$23.6 million	89.4 million	?	Hindustani	India	(Note: Aradhana gross: India – ₹70 million ($9.33 million); Soviet Union: 11.85 million Rbls (Note: 47.4 million tickets sold, average ticket price of 25 kopecks)) ($14.29 million) (Note: 0.829 Rbl per US dollar in 1972)) (Note: See Aradhana (1969 film) § Box office)
1970	Mera Naam Joker	$22.1 million	73.1 million	?	Hindustani	India	(Note: See Mera Naam Joker § Reception)
1971	The Big Boss (Fists of Fury)	$50 million	?	$100,000	Mandarin; Cantonese; Thai	Hong Kong	
1971	Caravan	$44 million	319 million	?	Hindustani	India	(Note: See Caravan (1971 film) § Box office)
1972	The Way of the Dragon (Return of the Dragon)	$130 million	58.5 million	$130,000	Mandarin; Cantonese	Hong Kong	(Note: The Way of the Dragon admissions: United States and Canada – 50,000,000; France and Germany – 5,502,004; Japan – 2,610,000; Bombay (New Excelsior theater) – 241,000 (eight weeks); South Korea (Seoul City) – 182,530; Denmark and Finland (2018–2019) – 758)
1972	Seeta Aur Geeta	$22.8 million	73 million	$53,000	Hindustani	India	(Note: See Seeta Aur Geeta § Box office) (Note: Seeta Aur Geeta admissions: India – 18 million; Soviet Union – 55.1 million)
1973	Bobby	$39 million	116 million	?	Hindustani	India	(Note: See Bobby (1973 film) § Box office)
1974	The Red Snowball Tree	$39 million	140 million	?	Russian	Soviet Union	
1975	Sholay (Embers)	$70 million	250 million	$3.57 million	Hindustani	India	(Note: See 1975 in film § Worldwide gross.)
1976	Manhunt	$70 million	434 million	?	Japanese	Japan	
1977	Legend of Dinosaurs & Monster Birds	$25 million	49.4 million	$2.79 million	Japanese	Japan	(Note: See Legend of Dinosaurs & Monster Birds § Box office)
1977	Amar Akbar Anthony	$18 million	61 million	?	Hindustani	India	
1978	Game of Death	$50 million	?	$850,000	Cantonese	Hong Kong	(Note: See Game of Death § Box office)
1978	Muqaddar Ka Sikandar	$32 million	92 million	?	Hindustani	India	(Note: Muqaddar Ka Sikandar admissions: India – 67 million; Soviet Union – 25.2 million)
1979	Gunshots in the CIB	$116 million	600 million	?	Mandarin	China	
1980	The Gods Must Be Crazy	$200 million	16.9 million	$5 million	Afrikaans; Juǀʼhoan	South Africa; Botswana	
1980	Legend of the White Snake	$91 million	700 million	?	Mandarin	China	
1981	In-Laws (Full House of Joy)	$59 million	650 million	?	Mandarin	China	
1982	Shaolin Temple	$112 million	500 million	$264,000	Mandarin	China; Hong Kong	(Note: See Shaolin Temple (1982 film) § Box office)
1983	Antarctica	$101 million	12.5 million	?	Japanese	Japan	(Note: See List of highest-grossing Japanese films § Japanese films by number of box office admissions.)
1983	Wudang (The Undaunted Wudang)	$61 million	610 million	?	Mandarin	China	
1984	Deadly Fury (Pride's Deadly Fury)	$45 million	500 million	?	Mandarin	China	
1985	The Burmese Harp	$29 million	5.3 million	?	Japanese	Japan	(Note: See List of highest-grossing Japanese films § Highest-grossing Japanese films by year.)
1985	Juvenile Delinquents (Innocent Teenagers)	$14 million	161 million	?	Mandarin; Cantonese	Hong Kong	
1986	The Adventures of Milo and Otis	$104 million	12 million	?	Japanese	Japan	(Note: $13,299,749 in the United States. $90,822,000 in other territories.)
1986	Great Shanghai 1937	$11 million	121 million	?	Mandarin	China	
1987	Hachiko Monogatari	$24 million	3 million	?	Japanese	Japan	
1987	Mirage (Hai shi shen lou)	$10 million	113 million	?	Mandarin	China	
1988	The Silk Road (Dun-Huang)	$74.1 million	7.3 million	?	Japanese	Japan	(Note: $74,000,000 in Japan. $123,959 in the United States.)
1989	Kiki's Delivery Service	$31.5 million	2.64 million	?	Japanese	Japan	(Note: ¥4.3 billion (US$31 million) in Japan. HK$4.04 million (US$519,000) in Hong Kong.)
1989	Maine Pyar Kiya	$17.3 million	79.7 million	$1.23 million	Hindi	India	
1990	Heaven and Earth	$64 million	7.8 million	?	Japanese	Japan	
1991	Armour of God II: Operation Condor	$24.1 million	?	$15 million	Cantonese	Hong Kong	(Note: See Armour of God II: Operation Condor § Box office)
1992	Zhou Enlai	$49 million	100 million	?	Mandarin	China	
1993	Godzilla vs. Mechagodzilla II	$36 million	3.8 million	$9.5 million	Japanese	Japan	
1994	Hum Aapke Hain Koun..! (Who Am I to You?)	$80 million	74 million	$1.35 million	Hindi	India	
1995	Rumble in the Bronx	$76 million	22.3 million	$1.5 million	Cantonese	Hong Kong	(Note: See Rumble in the Bronx § Box office)
1996	Police Story 4: First Strike	$53.2 million	21.9 million	?	Cantonese; Russian; Ukrainian	Hong Kong	(Note: See First Strike (1996 film) § Box office)
1997	Life Is Beautiful	$230 million	31.9 million	$20 million	Italian	Italy	(Note: 20,354,615 tickets in Europe. 11.5 million tickets in the United States.)
1998	Pokémon: The First Movie	$173 million	36.8 million	$10 million	Japanese	Japan	
1999	Pokémon: The Movie 2000	$134 million	19.6 million	$30 million	Japanese	Japan	
2000	Crouching Tiger, Hidden Dragon	$214 million	?	$17 million	Mandarin	China; Hong Kong; Taiwan	
2001	Spirited Away	$396 million	46.4 million	$19 million	Japanese	Japan	
2002	Hero	$177 million	?	$31 million	Mandarin	Hong Kong; China	
2003	Bayside Shakedown 2	$164 million	12.8 million	?	Japanese	Japan	
2004	The Passion of the Christ	$612 million	91 million	?	Aramaic; Latin; Hebrew	United States	(Note: The Passion of the Christ admissions: North America – 59,625,500; France, Germany, Italy, Spain – 9,484,483; South Korea – 2,523,700; Other territories – 19,495,721)
2005	Yamato	$46 million	?	?	Japanese	Japan	
2006	Apocalypto	$121 million	14 million	$40 million	Yucatec Maya	USA; Mexico; Guatemala	
2007	Hero	$80.4 million	?	?	Japanese	Japan	
2008	Welcome to the Sticks	$245 million	26.3 million	$14 million	French; Ch'ti	France	
2009	Mulan: Rise of a Warrior	$304 million	?	$6.5 million	Mandarin	China	
2010	Arrietty	$146 million	12.4 million	$23 million	Japanese	Japan	
2011	The Intouchables	$426 million	50.2 million	$10.8 million	French	France	
2012	Lost in Thailand	$197 million	37.9 million	$4.6 million	Mandarin	China	
2013	Journey to the West: Conquering the Demons	$205 million	30.5 million	$64 million	Mandarin	China; Hong Kong	
2014	Breakup Buddies	$189 million	34 million	$11 million	Mandarin	China	
2015	Monster Hunt	$387 million	65.7 million	$56 million	Mandarin	China; Hong Kong	
2016	The Mermaid	$553 million	93 million	$60 million	Mandarin	China; Hong Kong	(Note: The Mermaid admissions: China – 92,642,600; North America – 376,800)
2016	Dangal	$340 million	140 million	$10 million	Hindi	India	
2017	Wolf Warrior 2	$870 million	160 million	$30 million	Mandarin	China	
2018	Operation Red Sea	$579 million	93.8 million	$70 million	Mandarin; Arabic	China	(Note: Operation Red Sea admissions: China – 93,610,000; United States and Canada – 168,400; United Kingdom and Norway – 11,303)
2019	Ne Zha	$743 million	140 million	$20 million	Mandarin	China; Hong Kong	
2020	Demon Slayer: Mugen Train	$512.7 million	57.6 million	$15.8 million	Japanese	Japan	
2021	The Battle at Lake Changjin	$906 million	125 million	$200 million	Mandarin	China	
2022	The Battle at Lake Changjin II	$627 million	83 million	?	Mandarin	China	
2023	Full River Red	$674 million	91.8 million	$72.7 million	Mandarin	China	
2024	YOLO	$479.6 million	50 million	?	Mandarin	China	
2025	Ne Zha 2	$2.218 billion	328 million	$80 million	Mandarin	China	
2026	Pegasus 3	$656.4 million	96 million	$70 million	Mandarin	China	

(...) Since grosses are not limited to original theatrical runs, a film's first-run gross is included in brackets after the total if known.

^{TBA}To be ascertained.

== Timeline of highest-grossing films ==
=== Box office revenue ===
Established	Title	Record-setting gross	Primary language(s)	Country of origin	Ref
1940	Zindagi (The Life)	$1.58 million	Hindustani	British India	
1941	Khazanchi (Cashier)	$2.12 million	Hindustani	British India	
1942	Basant (Spring)	$2.42 million	Hindustani	British India	
1943	Kismet (Fate)	$3.32 million	Hindustani	British India	(Note: Kismet: Gross – ₹10 million ($3.32 million) (Note: 3.3223 Indian rupees per US dollar in 1943) in 1943; Budget – ₹200,000+ ($60,000))
1945	Guilty Without Guilt	$8 million	Russian	Soviet Union	
1945	The War at Sea from Hawaii to Malaya	$17 million	Japanese	Japan	
1957	Awaara (The Vagabond)	$17 million	Hindustani	India	
1957	Mother India	$17 million	Hindustani	India	
1960	Pather Panchali	$21 million	Bengali	India	
1960	Awaara (The Vagabond)	$22.9 million	Hindustani	India	
1960	Mughal-e-Azam (The Great Mughal)	$23.1 million	Hindi, Urdu	India	
1965	Ganga Jamna	$23.6 million	Awadhi, Hindustani	India	
1968	Awaara (The Vagabond)	$30.7 million	Hindustani	India	
1968	Apache Gold (Winnetou the Warrior)	$36.7 million	German	West Germany; Italy; Yugoslavia	
1968	The Good, the Bad and the Ugly	$38.9 million	Italian, Spanish	Italy	
1973	The Big Boss (Fists of Fury)	$50 million	Cantonese, Mandarin, Thai	Hong Kong	
1973	Fist of Fury (The Chinese Connection)	$100 million	Cantonese, Mandarin	Hong Kong	
1974	The Way of the Dragon (Return of the Dragon)	$100 million	Cantonese, Mandarin	Hong Kong	
1979	The Way of the Dragon (Return of the Dragon)	$130 million	Cantonese, Mandarin	Hong Kong	
1989	The Gods Must Be Crazy	$200 million	Afrikaans and Juǀʼhoan	South Africa; Botswana	
1999	Life Is Beautiful	$221 million	Italian	Italy	
2001	Spirited Away	$275 million	Japanese	Japan	
2004	The Passion of the Christ	$611 million	Aramaic, Latin, Hebrew	United States	
2005	The Passion of the Christ	$612 million	Aramaic, Latin, Hebrew	United States	
2017	Wolf Warrior 2	$870 million	Mandarin	China	
2021	The Battle at Lake Changjin	$913 million	Mandarin	China	
2025	Ne Zha 2	$2.218 billion	Mandarin	China	

=== Box office admissions ===
Established	Title	Record ticket sales	Primary language(s)	Country of origin	Ref
1940	The Fighters	27.1 million	Russian	Soviet Union	
1941	Khazanchi (Cashier)	30 million	Hindustani	British India	
1942	Basant (Spring)	30 million	Hindustani	British India	
1943	Kismet (Fate)	35 million	Hindustani	British India	
1944	Rattan	35 million	Hindustani	British India	
1945	The War at Sea from Hawaii to Malaya	100 million	Japanese	Japan	
1957	Awaara (The Vagabond)	100 million	Hindustani	India	
1957	Mother India	100 million	Hindustani	India	
1960	Mughal-e-Azam (The Great Mughal)	100 million	Hindi, Urdu	India	
1966	Amphibian Man	100 million	Russian	Soviet Union	
1966	Mother India	150 million	Hindustani	India	
1966	Mughal-e-Azam	150 million	Hindi, Urdu	India	
1966	Awaara	157 million	Hindustani	India	
1978	Sholay (Embers)	190 million	Hindustani	India	
1978	Awaara	217 million	Hindustani	India	
1979	Sholay	250 million	Hindustani	India	
1979	Tunnel War	300 million	Mandarin	China	
1979	Caravan	319 million	Hindustani	India	
1979	Manhunt	434 million	Japanese	Japan	
1979	Gunshots in the CIB	500 million	Mandarin	China	
1980	Gunshots in the CIB	600 million	Mandarin	China	
1981	Legend of the White Snake	700 million	Mandarin	China	

=== Opening weekend ===
The following is a timeline of the highest-grossing openings for non-English films. Since films do not open on Fridays in many markets, the 'opening' is taken to be the gross between the first day of release and the first Sunday following the film's release.

Title	Established	Record opening	Primary language(s)	Country of origin	Ref
The War at Sea from Hawaii to Malaya	1943	$260,000	Japanese	Japan	
Mughal-e-Azam (The Great Mughal)	1960	$840,000	Hindi, Urdu	India	
The Way of the Dragon	1974	$1,435,000 (Note: New York City and Chicago only)	Mandarin, Cantonese	Hong Kong	(Note: $1 million in New York City. $250,000 at Chicago's Oriental Theater. $185,000 at two other Chicago theaters.)
Rumble in the Bronx	1995	$15,000,000 (Note: China release)	Cantonese	Hong Kong	
Pokémon: The First Movie	1999	$50,754,104 (Note: US and Canada release)	Japanese	Japan	
The Passion of the Christ	2004	$125,200,000 (Note: Five-day worldwide opening)	Aramaic, Hebrew, Latin	United States	
The Mermaid	2016	$274,049,983	Mandarin	China	
The Wandering Earth	2019	$298,110,095	Mandarin	China	
Detective Chinatown 3	2021	$398,000,000	Mandarin	China	
Ne Zha 2	2025	$431,280,000	Mandarin	China	

== Highest-grossing films by language ==
=== Box office revenue ===
The following is a list of highest-grossing films by language.

† indicates films playing in the week commencing 6 November 2026 in theaters around the world.

Language	English title	Original title	Country of origin	Worldwide gross	Year	Ref
Afrikaans	The Gods Must Be Crazy	The Gods Must Be Crazy	South Africa; Botswana	$200,000,000	1980	
Amharic	Capernaum	كفرناحوم	Lebanon	$68,000,000	2018	
Arabic	Operation Red Sea	红海行动	China; Hong Kong	$579,000,000	2018	
Aramaic	The Passion of the Christ	The Passion of the Christ	United States	$612,000,000	2004	
Awadhi	Ganga Jamna	गंगा जमना گنگا جامنی	India	$23,600,000	1961	
Bengali	Toofan	তুফান	Bangladesh	$4,700,000	2024	
Cantonese	Ip Man 4: The Finale	葉問4：完結篇	Hong Kong; China	$239,000,000	2019	(Note: See Ip Man 4: The Finale § Reception)
Filipino	Hello, Love, Again	Hello, Love, Again	Philippines	$28,300,000	2024	
French	The Intouchables	Intouchables	France	$427,000,000	2011	
German	The Shoe of Manitou	Der Schuh des Manitu	Germany	$75,700,000	2001	
Greek	Zorba the Greek	Αλέξης Ζορμπάς	Greece; United States	$23,500,000	1964	
Haryanvi	Dangal	दंगल	India	$340,000,000	2016	
Hebrew	The Passion of the Christ	The Passion of the Christ	United States	$612,000,000	2004	
Hindi	Dangal	दंगल	India	$340,000,000	2016	
Hindustani	Dangal	दंगल	India	$340,000,000	2016	
Italian	Life Is Beautiful	La vita è bella	Italy	$230,000,000	1997	
Japanese	Demon Slayer: Infinity Castle	劇場版「鬼滅の刃」無限城編	Japan	$800,413,549	2025	
Juǀʼhoan	The Gods Must Be Crazy	The Gods Must Be Crazy	South Africa; Botswana	$200,000,000	1980	
Kannada	KGF: Chapter 2	ಕೆ ಜಿ ಎಫ್: ಅಧ್ಯಾಯ ೨	India	$159,020,000	2022	
Korean	Parasite	기생충	South Korea	$262,500,000	2019	
Latin	The Passion of the Christ	The Passion of the Christ	United States	$612,000,000	2004	
Malayalam	Bethlehem Kudumba Unit	ബെത്‌ലഹേം കുടുംബ യൂണിറ്റ്	India	$34,900,000	2026	
Mandarin	Ne Zha 2	哪吒之魔童闹海	China	$2,217,758,382	2025	
Mayan	Apocalypto	Apocalypto	United States; Mexico; Guatemala	$121,000,000	2006	
Romanian	Teambuilding	Teambuilding	Romanian	$5,100,000	2022	
Russian	Cheburashka	Чебурашка	Russia	$83,800,000	2023	
Spanish	Instructions Not Included	No se aceptan devoluciones	Mexico	$101,000,000	2013	
Tamil	2.0	௨.௦	India	$117,000,000	2018	
Telugu	Baahubali 2: The Conclusion	బాహుబలి 2: ది కన్ క్లూజన్	India	$278,000,000	2017	
Teochew	Dear You	给阿嬷的情书	China	$297,810,000	2026	
Thai	Lost in the Stars	消失的她	China	$489,000,000	2023	
Ukrainian	Police Story 4: First Strike	警察故事4之簡單任務	Hong Kong	$53,200,000	1996	
Urdu	Mughal-e-Azam (The Great Mughal)	मुग़ल-ए-आज़म مغل اعظم	India	$23,100,000	1960	

=== Box office admissions ===
The following is a list of highest box office admissions by language.

Language	English title	Original title	Country of origin	Tickets sold	Year	Ref
Afrikaans	The Gods Must Be Crazy	The Gods Must Be Crazy	South Africa; Botswana	16.9 million	1980	
Amharic	Capernaum	كفرناحوم	Lebanon	13.6 million	2018	(Note: Capernaum admissions: China – 12,138,400; Europe – 1,215,840; United States – 182,000; Brazil – 56,167)
Arabic	Operation Red Sea	红海行动	China; Hong Kong	93.8 million	2018	
Aramaic	The Passion of the Christ	The Passion of the Christ	United States	91 million	2004	
Awadhi	Ganga Jamna	गंगा जमना گنگا جامنی	India	84 million	1961	
Cantonese	Juvenile Delinquents (Innocent Teenagers)	少年犯	China; Hong Kong	161 million	1985	
French	Zorro	Zorro	France; Italy; Spain	133 million	1964	
German	Apache Gold (Winnetou the Warrior)	Winnetou	West Germany; Italy; Yugoslavia	78.1 million	1963	
Haryanvi	Dangal	दंगल	India	140 million	2016	
Hebrew	The Passion of the Christ	The Passion of the Christ	United States	91 million	2004	
Hindi	Caravan	कारवाँ کاروان	India	319 million	1971	
Hindustani	Caravan	कारवाँ کاروان	India	319 million	1971	
Italian	Hercules	Le Fatiche di Ercole	Italy	66.6 million	1958	
Japanese	Manhunt	君よ憤怒の河を渉れ	Japan	434 million	1976	
Juǀʼhoan	The Gods Must Be Crazy	The Gods Must Be Crazy	South Africa; Botswana	16.9 million	1980	
Kannada	KGF: Chapter 2	ಕೆ ಜಿ ಎಫ್: ಅಧ್ಯಾಯ ೨	India	50.5 million	2022	
Korean	Parasite	기생충	South Korea	30.9 million	2019	(Note: Parasite admissions: South Korea – 10,313,201; Europe – 9,812,602; United States – 5,826,392; Japan – 3,511,111; Brazil – 1,010,797; Peru and Ecuador – 425,290)
Latin	The Passion of the Christ	The Passion of the Christ	United States	91 million	2004	
Mandarin	Legend of the White Snake	白蛇传	China	700 million	1980	
Mayan	Apocalypto	Apocalypto	United States; Mexico; Guatemala	14 million	2006	
Romanian	Uncle Marin, the Billionaire	Nea Mărin miliardar	Romania	14.6 million	1979	
Russian	The Red Snowball Tree	Калина красная	Soviet Union	140 million	1974	
Spanish	Yesenia	Yesenia	Mexico	91 million	1971	
Telugu	Baahubali 2: The Conclusion	బాహుబలి ౨: ది కన్ క్లూజన్	India	150 million	2017	
Teochew	Dear You	给阿嬷的情书	China	58.7 million	2026	
Thai	Lost in the Stars	消失的她	China	84.8 million	2023	
Ukrainian	Police Story 4: First Strike	警察故事4之簡單任務	Hong Kong	21.9 million	1996	
Urdu	Caravan	कारवाँ کاروان	India	319 million	1971	

=== Openings ===
The following is a list of highest-grossing openings by language. Since films do not open on Fridays in many markets, the 'opening' is taken to be the gross between the first day of release and the first Sunday following the film's release.

Language	English title	Original title	Country of origin	Opening gross	Year	Ref
Amharic	Capernaum	كفرناحوم	Lebanon	$24,936,722	2018	
Arabic	Once Upon a Time in the Middle East	欢迎来龙餐馆 مرحبًا بكم في مطعمِ التنينِ	China	$148,000,000	2026	
Aramaic	The Passion of the Christ	The Passion of the Christ	United States	$125,200,000	2004	
Cantonese	Shock Wave 2	拆弹专家2	China; Hong Kong	$63,800,000	2020	
French	Welcome to the Sticks	Bienvenue chez les Ch'tis	France	$31,674,375	2008	
German	Fack ju Göhte 2 (Suck Me Shakespeer 2)	Fack ju Göhte 2	Germany	$20,113,773	2015	
Hebrew	The Passion of the Christ	The Passion of the Christ	United States	$125,200,000	2004	
Hindi	Dhurandhar	Dhurandhar	India	$115.3	2026	
Italian	Quo Vado?	Quo Vado?	Italy	$24,185,632	2016	
Japanese	Pokémon: The First Movie	劇場版ポケットモンスター ミュウツーの逆襲	Japan	$50,754,104	1999	
Kannada	KGF: Chapter 2	ಕೆ ಜಿ ಎಫ್: ಅಧ್ಯಾಯ ೨	India	$70,600,000	2022	
Korean	The Admiral: Roaring Currents	명량	South Korea	$35,517,175	2014	
Latin	The Passion of the Christ	The Passion of the Christ	United States	$125,200,000	2004	
Malayalam	L2: Empuraan	L2: എംപുരാൻ	India	$19,600,000	2025	
Mandarin	Ne Zha 2	哪吒之魔童闹海	China	$431,280,000	2025	
Mayan	Apocalypto	Apocalypto	United States; Mexico; Guatemala	$15,005,604	2006	
Russian	Stalingrad	Сталинград	Russia	$16,256,340	2013	
Spanish	Instructions Not Included	No se aceptan devoluciones	Mexico	$11,578,515	2013	
Tamil	Coolie	கூலி	India	$17,010,603	2025	
Telugu	Pushpa 2: The Rule	పుష్ప ౨: ది రూల్	India	$92,750,000	2024	
Teochew	Dear You	给阿嬷的情书	China	$9,200,000	2026	
Thai	Lost in the Stars	消失的她	China	$100,000,000	2023	
Ukrainian	Police Story 4: First Strike	警察故事4之簡單任務	Hong Kong	$5,778,933	1997	
Urdu	The Legend of Maula Jatt	دی لجینڈ آف مولا جٹ	Pakistan	$2,300,000	2022	

== Highest-grossing film franchises and film series ==
The following is the Highest-grossing non-English film franchises and film series. Fengshen Cinematic Universe sits at the top with $3.2 billion, and has the best average at $1.1 billion per film.

† Background shading indicates that at least one film in the series is playing in the week commencing 6 November 2026 in theaters around the world.

Highest-grossing non-English film franchises and film series^{[§]}(The films in each franchise can be viewed by selecting "show")

Rank	Series	Total worldwide box office	No. of films	Average of films	Highest-grossing film

1
Fengshen Cinematic Universe
$3,204,115,556
3
$1,068,038,519
Ne Zha 2 ($2,217,758,382)

	Ne Zha series	$2,960,272,451	2	$1,480,136,226	Ne Zha 2 ($2,217,758,382)
1	Ne Zha 2 (2025)	$2,217,758,382			
2	Ne Zha (2019)	$742,514,069			

Jiang Ziya: Legend of Deification (2020)	$243,843,105

2	Doraemon	$1,923,303,315	47	$40,921,347	Stand by Me Doraemon ($183,442,714)
/ New Generation / $826,345,576 / 20 / $41,317,279 / Nobita's Treasure Island ($81,481,186); 1 / Nobita's Treasure Island (2018) / $81,481,186; 2 / Nobita's Chronicle of the Moon Exploration (2019) / $65,406,606; 3 / Great Adventure in the Antarctic Kachi Kochi (2017) / $61,060,700; 4 / Nobita and the Birth of Japan 2016 (2016) / $50,939,840; 5 / Nobita's Earth Symphony (2024) / $46,704,773; 6 / Nobita and the Island of Miracles (2012) / $46,180,706; 7 / Nobita's Sky Utopia (2023) / $45,525,160; 8 / Nobita's New Dinosaur (2020) / $43,035,655; 9 / Nobita's Secret Gadget Museum (2013) / $42,770,271; 10 / Nobita's Art World Tales (2025) † / $39,693,669; 11 / New Nobita's Great Demon-Peko and the Exploration Party of Five (2014) / $35,861,856; 12 / Nobita's Space Heroes (2015) / $34,811,747; 13 / Nobita's Great Battle of the Mermaid King (2010) / $34,701,783; 14 / Nobita's New Great Adventure into the Underworld (2007) / $32,787,846; 15 / Nobita and the Green Giant Legend (2008) / $31,393,786; 16 / Nobita's Dinosaur 2006 (2006) / $30,963,292; 17 / Nobita and the New Steel Troops-Winged Angels (2011) / $29,260,430; 18 / New Nobita and the Castle of the Undersea Devil (2026) / $26,300,000; 19 / The Record of Nobita's Spaceblazer (2009) / $25,422,212; 20 / Nobita's Little Star Wars 2021 (2022) / $22,044,058
/ Original series / $495,825,792 / 25 / $19,833,032 / Nobita's the Legend of the Sun King ($28,300,000); 1 / Nobita's the Legend of the Sun King (2000) / $28,300,000; 2 / Nobita and the Spiral City (1997) / $28,000,000; 3 / Nobita's Great Adventure in the South Seas (1998) / $28,000,000; 4 / Nobita Drifts in the Universe (1999) / $27,700,000; 5 / Nobita in the Robot Kingdom (2002) / $16,076,303; 6 / Nobita in the Wan-Nyan Spacetime Odyssey (2004) / $26,663,978; 7 / Nobita and the Birth of Japan (1989) / $26,600,000; 8 / Nobita and the Galaxy Super-express (1996) / $25,700,000; 9 / Nobita and the Winged Braves (2001) / $25,100,000; 10 / Nobita and the Tin Labyrinth (1993) / $24,100,000; 11 / Nobita's Diary of the Creation of the World (1995) / $23,200,000; 12 / Nobita's Dorabian Nights (1991) / $22,500,000; 13 / Nobita's Three Visionary Swordsmen (1994) / $21,900,000; 14 / Nobita and the Kingdom of Clouds (1992) / $21,700,000; 15 / Nobita and the Animal Planet (1990) / $21,500,000; 16 / Nobita and the Windmasters (2003) / $20,455,511; 17 / The Record of Nobita's Parallel Visit to the West (1988) / $18,200,000; 18 / Nobita and the Knights on Dinosaurs (1987) / $16,600,000; 19 / The Records of Nobita, Spaceblazer (1981) / $14,300,000; 20 / Nobita and the Steel Troops (1986) / $12,500,000; 21 / Nobita's Great Adventure into the Underworld (1984) / $12,500,000; 22 / Nobita's Dinosaur (1980) / $10,600,000; 23 / Nobita and the Haunts of Evil (1982) / $8,640,000; 24 / Nobita's Little Star Wars (1985) / $7,820,000; 25 / Nobita and the Castle of the Undersea Devil (1983) / $7,170,000
/ Stand by Me Doraemon series / $248,644,088 / 2 / $124,322,044 / Stand by Me Doraemon ($183,442,714); 1 / Stand by Me Doraemon (2014) / $183,442,714; 2 / Stand by Me Doraemon 2 (2020) / $65,201,374

3	Detective Chinatown	$1,881,651,038	4	$470,412,760	Detective Chinatown 3 ($702,700,000)
1	Detective Chinatown 3 (2021)	$702,700,000			
2	Detective Chinatown 2 (2018)	$544,185,156			
3	Detective Chinatown 1900 (2025)	$508,922,947			
4	Detective Chinatown (2015)	$125,842,935			

4
Detective Conan †
$1,665,127,584
29
$57,418,193
One-eyed Flashback ($166,061,012)

	Main series †	$1,623,729,857	28	$57,990,352	One-eyed Flashback ($166,061,012)
1	One-eyed Flashback (2025)	$166,061,012			
2	The Million-dollar Pentagram (2024)	$150,008,115			
3	The Fist of Blue Sapphire (2019)	$123,009,017			
4	Black Iron Submarine (2023)	$121,879,597			
5	Zero the Enforcer (2018)	$107,918,046			
6	The Bride of Halloween (2022)	$102,599,093			
7	The Scarlet Bullet (2021)	$102,541,282			
8	Fallen Angel of the Highway (2026) †	$83,700,000			
9	The Darkest Nightmare (2016)	$66,910,978			
10	Crimson Love Letter (2017)	$63,144,805			
11	The Eleventh Striker (2012)	$44,369,456			
12	Quarter of Silence (2011)	$42,808,578			
13	Dimensional Sniper (2014)	$42,028,116			
14	Sunflowers of Inferno (2015)	$40,417,504			
15	The Raven Chaser (2009)	$39,664,359			
16	The Lost Ship in the Sky (2010)	$36,407,407			
17	Private Eye in the Distant Sea (2013)	$36,324,232			
18	The Private Eyes' Requiem (2006)	$26,251,232			
19	Crossroad in the Ancient Capital (2003)	$24,342,320			
20	Captured in Her Eyes (2000)	$23,800,000			
21	The Phantom of Baker Street (2002)	$23,783,234			
22	Full Score of Fear (2008)	$23,760,176			
23	Countdown to Heaven (2001)	$23,700,000			
24	Magician of the Silver Sky (2004)	$22,618,511			
25	Jolly Roger in the Deep Azure (2007)	$22,118,835			
26	The Last Wizard of the Century (1999)	$22,000,000			
27	Strategy Above the Depths (2005)	$18,723,952			
28	The Fourteenth Target (1998)	$14,100,000			
29	The Time Bombed Skyscraper (1997)	$8,740,000			

Lupin the 3rd vs. Detective Conan: The Movie (2013)	$41,397,727

5	The Battle at Lake Changjin	$1,540,112,194	2	$770,056,097	The Battle at Lake Changjin ($913,540,914)
1	The Battle at Lake Changjin (2021)	$913,540,914			
2	The Battle at Lake Changjin II (2022)	$626,571,280			

6	Boonie Bears	$1,431,895,042	12	$119,324,587	Time Twist ($277,106,954)
1	Time Twist (2024)	$277,106,954			
2	Guardian Code (2023)	$221,300,000			
3	The Hidden Protector (2026)	$154,000,000			
4	Back to Earth (2022)	$152,000,000			
5	Blast into the Past (2019)	$112,369,259			
6	Future Reborn (2025)	$110,700,000			
7	The Wild Life (2021)	$97,225,611			
8	The Big Shrink (2018)	$96,788,929			
9	Entangled Worlds (2017)	$77,151,096			
10	A Mystical Winter (2015)	$47,581,416			
11	The Big Top Secret (2016)	$45,150,390			
12	To the Rescue (2014)	$40,521,387			

7	Demon Slayer: Kimetsu no Yaiba	$1,423,111,543	4	$355,777,886	Infinity Castle ($800,413,549)
1	Infinity Castle (2025) †	$800,413,549			
2	Mugen Train (2020)	$512,704,063			
3	To the Swordsmith Village (2023)	$59,554,259			
4	To the Hashira Training (2024)	$50,439,672			

8	Pegasus	$1,381,198,013	3	$460,399,338	Pegasus 3 ($656,459,523)
1	Pegasus 3 (2026)	$656,459,523			
2	Pegasus 2 (2024)	$468,905,664			
3	Pegasus (2019)	$255,832,826			

9	The Wandering Earth	$1,315,015,644	2	$657,507,822	The Wandering Earth ($699,992,512)
1	The Wandering Earth (2019)	$699,992,512			
2	The Wandering Earth 2 (2023)	$615,023,132			

10	My People, My Country	$1,093,606,281	3	$364,535,427	My People, My Country ($450,064,993)
1	My People, My Country (2019)	$450,064,993			
2	My People, My Homeland (2020)	$433,241,288			
3	My Country, My Parents (2021)	$210,300,000			

11	Pokémon	$1,074,461,112	23	$46,715,701	The First Movie ($172,744,662)
/ The Original / $423,996,689 / 5 / $84,799,338 / The First Movie ($172,744,662); 1 / The First Movie (1998) / $172,744,662; 2 / The Movie 2000 (1999) / $133,949,270; 3 / 3: The Movie (2000) / $68,411,275; 4 / 4Ever (2001) / $28,023,563; 5 / Heroes (2002) / $20,867,919
/ Diamond & Pearl / $207,651,955 / 4 / $51,912,989 / Zoroark: Master of Illusions ($71,143,529); 1 / Zoroark: Master of Illusions (2010) / $71,143,529; 2 / Arceus and the Jewel of Life (2009) / $50,673,078; 3 / Giratina and the Sky Warrior (2008) / $43,338,599; 4 / The Rise of Darkrai (2007) / $42,496,749
/ Best Wishes! / $135,384,123 / 3 / $45,128,041 / Black—Victini and Reshiram and White—Victini and Zekrom ($57,082,491); 1 / Black—Victini and Reshiram and White—Victini and Zekrom (2011) / $57,082,491; 2 / Kyurem vs. the Sword of Justice (2012) / $46,008,255; 3 / Genesect and the Legend Awakened (2013) / $32,293,377
/ Advanced Generation / $132,598,260 / 4 / $33,149,565 / Lucario and the Mystery of Mew ($37,228,626); 1 / Lucario and the Mystery of Mew (2005) / $37,228,626; 2 / Destiny Deoxys (2004) / $34,337,258; 3 / Jirachi Wish Maker (2003) / $33,393,751; 4 / Ranger and the Temple of the Sea (2006) / $27,638,625
/ Alternate continuity / $104,692,106 / 4 / $26,173,027 / I Choose You! ($37,552,144); 1 / I Choose You! (2017) / $37,552,144; 2 / Mewtwo Strikes Back: Evolution (2019) / $27,347,118; 3 / The Power of Us (2018) / $23,740,788; 4 / Secrets of the Jungle (2020) / $16,052,056
/ XY / $70,137,979 / 3 / $23,379,326 / Diancie and the Cocoon of Destruction ($28,595,105); 1 / Diancie and the Cocoon of Destruction (2014) / $28,595,105; 2 / Hoopa and the Clash of Ages (2015) / $21,815,482; 3 / Volcanion and the Mechanical Marvel (2016) / $19,727,392

12	Wolf Warrior	$951,736,770	2	$475,868,385	Wolf Warrior 2 ($870,325,439)
1	Wolf Warrior 2 (2017)	$870,325,439			
2	Wolf Warrior (2015)	$81,411,331			

13	Godzilla	$935,139,045	33	$28,337,547	Minus One ($116,000,000)
/ Showa Era / $514,685,669 / 15 / $34,312,378 / Godzilla vs. Mechagodzilla ($34,122,958); 1 / Godzilla vs. Mechagodzilla (1974) / $34,122,958; 2 / Godzilla / Godzilla, King of the Monsters! (1954) / $20,562,711; 3 / Raids Again (1955) / $20,000,000; 4 / King Kong vs. Godzilla (1962) / $20,000,000; 5 / Mothra vs. Godzilla (1964) / $20,000,000; 6 / Ghidorah, the Three-Headed Monster (1964) / $20,000,000; 7 / Invasion of Astro-Monster (1965) / $20,000,000; 8 / Ebirah, Horror of the Deep (1966) / $20,000,000; 9 / Son of Godzilla (1967) / $20,000,000; 10 / Destroy All Monsters (1968) / $20,000,000; 11 / All Monsters Attack (1969) / $20,000,000; 12 / Godzilla vs. Hedorah (1971) / $20,000,000; 13 / Godzilla vs. Gigan (1972) / $20,000,000; 14 / Godzilla vs. Megalon (1973) / $20,000,000; 15 / Terror of Mechagodzilla (1975) / $20,000,000
/ Heisei Era / $133,916,395 / 7 / $19,130,914 / Godzilla vs. Mechagodzilla II ($36,000,000); 1 / Godzilla vs. Mechagodzilla II (1993) / $36,000,000; 2 / Godzilla vs. Destoroyah (1995) / $24,800,000; 3 / Godzilla vs. Mothra (1992)^{R} / $20,000,000; 4 / Godzilla vs. SpaceGodzilla (1994)^{R} / $20,000,000; 5 / The Return of Godzilla / Godzilla 1985 (1984) / $15,116,395; 6 / Godzilla vs. King Ghidorah (1991)^{R} / $11,000,000; 7 / Godzilla vs. Biollante (1989)^{R} / $7,000,000
/ Millennium Era / $87,675,377 / 6 / $14,612,563 / 2000 ($25,037,390); 1 / 2000 (1999) / $25,037,390; 2 / Godzilla, Mothra and King Ghidorah: Giant Monsters All-Out Attack (2001) / $18,623,382; 3 / Against Mechagodzilla (2002) / $14,122,958; 4 / Tokyo S.O.S. (2003) / $10,724,345; 5 / Godzilla vs. Megaguirus (2000) / $10,000,000; 6 / Final Wars (2004) / $9,167,302
/ Reiwa Era / $199,778,604 / 5 / $39,955,721 / Godzilla Minus One ($116,000,000); 1 / Minus One (2023) / $116,000,000; 2 / Shin Godzilla (2016) / $78,053,145; 3 / Planet of the Monsters (2017) / $3,285,291; 4 / The Planet Eater (2018) / $1,523,168; 5 / City on the Edge of Battle (2018) / $917,000

14	Dragon Ball	$813,870,040	21	$38,755,716	Super: Broly ($124,500,000)
1	Curse of the Blood Rubies (1986) to Wrath of the Dragon (1995) (Note: According to Toei Animation, the first sixteen Dragon Ball films, from Dragon Ball: Curse of the Blood Rubies (1986) to Dragon Ball Z: Wrath of the Dragon (1995), had a total Japanese box office gross of over ¥40 billion ($460 million). Outside of Japan, the 2002–2003 European releases of Dragon Ball Z: The World's Strongest (1990) grossed $1,009,767, the 2016 Chinese release of Dragon Ball: Mystical Adventure (1988) grossed $9,714,846, and the 2018 North American releases of Dragon Ball Z films Broly: The Legendary Super Saiyan (1993) and Saiyan Double Feature (Fusion Reborn and Bardock: The Father of Goku) grossed $1,199,689.)	$471,924,302			
2	Super: Broly (2018)	$124,500,000			
3	Super: Super Hero (2022)	$97,242,192			
4	Z: Resurrection 'F' (2015)	$61,768,190			
5	Z: Battle of Gods (2013) (Note: The film grossed $52,761,356 worldwide, including $32 million in Japan, $2.8 million in the US and Canada, and $17,961,356 in other territories.)	$52,761,356			
6	The Path to Power (1996)	$5,674,000			

15	One Piece	$774,154,922	15	$51,610,328	Red ($246,500,000)
1	Red (2022)	$246,500,000			
2	Stampede (2019)	$94,684,223			
3	Z (2012)	$88,760,381			
4	Gold (2016)	$70,628,062			
5	Strong World (2009)	$61,221,810			
6	Clockwork Island Adventure (2001)	$37,590,678			
7	Baron Omatsuri and the Secret Island (2005)	$28,125,696			
8	One Piece: The Movie (2000)	$27,065,288			
9	Dead End Adventure (2003)	$25,060,452			
10	Chopper's Kingdom on the Island of Strange Animals (2002)	$25,060,452			
11	The Cursed Holy Sword (2004)	$22,559,589			
12	Giant Mecha Soldier of Karakuri Castle (2006)	$14,194,401			
13	Episode of Chopper Plus: Bloom in the Winter, Miracle Cherry Blossom (2008)	$11,527,808			
14	The Desert Princess and the Pirates: Adventures in Alabasta (2007)	$11,277,203			
15	Straw Hat Chase (2011)	$9,898,879			

16	Monster Hunt	$748,736,124	2	$374,368,062	Monster Hunt ($387,053,506)
1	Monster Hunt (2016)	$387,053,506			
2	Monster Hunt 2 (2018)	$361,682,618			

17	Investiture of the Gods	$541,520,862	2	$270,760,431	Kingdom of Storms ($369,081,777)
1	Kingdom of Storms (2021)	$369,081,777			
2	Demon Force (2025)	$172,439,085			

18	The Monkey King	$490,975,166	3	$163,658,389	The Monkey King 2 ($193,678,298)
1	The Monkey King 2 (2016)	$193,678,298			
2	The Monkey King (2014)	$182,206,924			
3	The Monkey King 3 (2013)	$115,089,944			

19	Asterix and Obelix	$473,576,978	5	$94,715,396	Asterix at the Olympic Games ($132,999,811)
1	Asterix at the Olympic Games (2008)	$132,999,811			
2	Mission Cleopatra (2002)	$131,116,046			
3	Asterix and Obelix vs. Caesar (1999)	$101,644,060			
4	God Save Britannia (2012)	$61,319,383			
5	The Middle Kingdom (2023)	$46,497,678			

20	Journey to the West	$463,805,149	2	$231,902,575	The Demons Strike Back ($248,805,149)
1	The Demons Strike Back (2017)	$248,805,149			
2	Conquering the Demons (2013)	$215,000,000			

== See also ==
- List of highest-grossing films
- List of highest-grossing media franchises
- List of most expensive non-English-language films
- Lists of highest-grossing films
- World cinema

== Bibliography ==
- Crystal, David (2006). "Chapter 9: English worldwide". In Denison, David; Hogg, Richard M. (eds.). A History of the English Language. Cambridge University Press. pp. 420–439. ISBN 978-0-511-16893-2.
- Ryfle, Steve (1998). Japan's Favorite Mon-Star: The Unauthorized Biography of the Big G. ECW Press. ISBN 1550223488.
