= Successor (2024 film) =

- Theatrical release poster
- Traditional Chinese: 抓娃娃
- Simplified Chinese: 抓娃娃
- Directed by: Yan Fei; Peng Damo
- Written by: Yan Fei; Peng Damo; Lin Bingbao
- Produced by: Zhang Lebin
- Starring: Shen Teng; Ma Li
- Cinematography: Sun Ming
- Edited by: Zhou Xiaolin
- Music by: Peng Fei
- Production companies: Haikou Xihong Hutong Film and Television; Wanda Film and Television Media; Tianjin Maoyan Microfilm Media; Zhejiang Kaixin Mahua Film; Shanghai Ruyi Film Production; Beijing Alibaba Film; Horgos Lianrui Film; China Film Co., Ltd.
- Distributed by: Wanda Film and Television Media; Tianjin Maoyan Microfilm Media; Haikou Xihong Hutong Film and Television; China Film Co., Ltd
- Release date: July 16, 2024
- Running time: 133 minutes
- Country: China
- Language: Mandarin
- Box office: $469.6 million

Successor (Chinese: 抓娃娃; pinyin: Zhuā wawa) is a 2024 Chinese comedy drama film co-directed by Yan Fei and Peng Damo, starring Shen Teng and Ma Li. It follows a wealthy couple, Ma Chenggang and his wife Chunlan, who decide to conceal their true wealth and start a reverse child-rearing journey in order to train their son Ma Jiye to be a capable family successor. Successor was released on July 16, 2024.

== Plot ==
In 2017, two teachers visit the house of Jiye, their student. They are appalled at the apparent state of extreme poverty. Flashbacks showcase Jiye's origins leading to the present.

Chenggang Ma, a wealthy man in Xihong City, worries that his eldest son is too spoiled to succeed him. Determined to raise a capable successor, he turns his focus to his younger son, Jiye, born to his second wife, Chunlan. Baby Jiye was obese and had everything he wanted. His father on the other hand grew up in poverty, and realizes that growing up in wealth was poisoning Jiye and making him unsuitable to inherit the family business. To his wife's utter disgust, he moves them to his old family home, forcing Jiye to abandon sweets, technology and wealth cold turkey. They also hire a professional nanny to implement the correct strategies and act as his grandmother.

They maintain an illusion of poverty, so that Jiye could develop qualities such as hard work, knowledge, careful budgeting, physical fitness, and perseverance. He runs to school, collects empty bottles for profit, and in the evening reads books. His father has hired workers and strategically located them all over Xihong City to monitor and have staged interactions with Jiye (buying vegetables for the family, practicing English, ensuring he is on time for school). Hidden doors and compartments throughout the house reveal the servants preparing their food, washing their clothes and monitoring Jiye everyday.

Jiye is kidnapped by his older brother who tries to indulge him with expensive baths and gifts. After rescuing him they discover that he has secretly bought a tablet and is playing video games. Stashing it in the toilet box when not seen, the tablet breaks and the electronics store refuses to give him a refund for it. The family "forgives" him and he recuperates some of the money by picking up hundreds of bottles from a football game played by the Daxiang team. (Note: A reference to Shen's previous film, Hello Mr. Billionaire) He also befriends his classmate, Feifei Zhang.

By 2024, Jiye is now in his senior year of High School and preparing for the Gaokao. They have high hopes he will enter Qingbei University. He is still riding the same bike and living under the same surveillance. At school, he openly expresses suspicions of his life being controlled and his destiny being decided, but is rebuffed. On his way home, he encounters the nanny playing basketball and chases after her. He doesn't catch her in time and the family tries to distract him. Later, they pretend that she died.

Feifei hears about his paranoias and tells him she saw his parents at their previous posh apartment where Jiye's brother still lives. The older brother got bad grades and accomplished nothing in life. Jiye shows up and they convince him that they are simply cleaning workers for them. Seeing a dove at the bottom of the pool triggers a memory of his early childhood, but Jiye convinces them that he is still in the ruse. Chenggang's workers gag Jiye's brother and trap him in the bathroom.

On the day of the Gaokao, the workers cannot find Jiye anywhere after the exam. They think Jiye's brother has kidnapped him; the day is replayed from Jiye's point of view. He draws a dove on his answer sheet and leaves the hall early. He finds and breaks into the secret entrance to the underground planning room, revealing everything about his childhood. His father initially congratulates him but then loses his temper and starts berating him for throwing away all of their efforts. Jiye insists he needs to plan his own future and make his own decisions. He runs into a pond where a group of kids are playing; his parents and everyone who work for them just stand and watch. Jiye's brother's plan is revealed to be an effort to climb mountains in the Himalayas. While running a marathon in Paris, Jiye repeatedly stops to collect water bottles as he did in his childhood.

== Cast ==
- Shen Teng as Ma Chenggang
- Ma Li as Chunlan
- Shi Pengyuan as Ma Jiye
  - Xiao Bochen as young Ma Jiye
- Sa Rina as Grandma / Teacher Li
- Zhang Zidong as Ma Dajun
- Jia Bing as President Jia
- Wei Xiang as Mr. Wei
- Li Jiaqi as Zhang Feifei

== Release ==
Successor was released on July 16, 2024 in China. Internationally the film was released by CMC Pictures, starting on August 2, 2024. On October 1, 2024, after earning 3.226 billion yuan at the box office, the top 2024 summer movie, "Successor ", started online broadcasting. It was launched on video platforms such as iQiyi, Tencent Video, and Youku. On September 25, the film was scheduled to be broadcast online and aired on Tencent Video on September 30.

=== Promotional activities ===
On June 15, 2024, the film released a release poster and announced that it would be released nationwide on July 18. On June 27, the film released a trailer. On July 2, the film was officially announced to be released in China on July 16. On July 8, the film released a "full harvest" trailer. On the same day, the film released posters in CINITY, IMAX, China Giant Screen, and Dolby Cinema formats. On August 7, the film announced an extension on its release to September 15, and again on September 5 extending its release to October 15.

== Reception ==
As of October 28, 2024, Successor has received a rating of more than 8.0 on Douban, with a box office of $3.328 billion yuan. It is currently the ninth highest-grossing film of 2024.

== See also ==
- List of Chinese films of 2024
