= List of highest-grossing sports films =

The following is a list of highest-grossing sports films of all time, the highest-grossing sports film franchises and series, the highest-grossing films by sport, the highest-grossing sports films by year, timeline of highest-grossing sports films, and sports films by tickets sold.

== Highest-grossing sports films ==
The following is a list of the highest-grossing sports films of all time. Rocky is the most prominent series, with all of its installments included. The Sport with the most films based on it is Boxing, with twelve total. 2006, 2013, and 2026 are the most prominent years, with three films total each. Film series such as The Fast & the Furious which began in auto racing, but leaned into other genres of film as it progressed are not included.

Film	Year	Worldwide gross	Ref	Sport(s)
Pegasus 3	2026	$656,459,523		Rally racing
F1	2025	$634,142,436		Auto racing
Cars 2	2011	$559,852,396		Auto racing
Cars	2006	$485,430,903		Auto racing
YOLO	2024	$479,597,304		Boxing
Pegasus 2	2024	$468,905,664		Rally racing
Cars 3	2017	$383,930,656		Auto racing
The Karate Kid	2010	$359,126,022		Martial arts (karate)
Kung Fu Soccer †	2026	$344,740,000		Association football
Dangal	2016	$340,000,000		Wrestling
The Blind Side	2009	$309,208,309		American football
Never Say Never	2023	$304,280,699		Mixed martial arts
Rocky IV	1985	$300,473,716		Boxing
Real Steel	2011	$299,268,508		Boxing
Turbo	2013	$282,570,682		Auto racing
Creed III	2023	$275,248,615		Boxing
Jerry Maguire	1996	$273,552,592		American football
Rocky III	1982	$270,000,000		Boxing
The First Slam Dunk	2022	$257,548,133		Basketball
Pegasus	2019	$255,832,826		Rally racing
Babe	1995	$254,134,910		Sheepdog trial
Space Jam	1996	$250,180,384		Basketball
Planes	2013	$240,171,783		Air racing
Ford v Ferrari	2019	$225,508,210		Auto racing
Rocky	1976	$225,000,000		Boxing
Million Dollar Baby	2004	$216,763,646		Boxing
Creed II	2018	$214,215,889		Boxing
Rocky II	1979	$200,182,160		Boxing
Goat	2026	$195,356,870		Basketball
The Longest Yard	2005	$191,466,556		American football
The Waterboy	1998	$185,991,646		American football
Creed	2015	$173,567,581		Boxing
Dodgeball: A True Underdog Story	2004	$168,423,227		Dodgeball
Space Jam: A New Legacy	2021	$163,692,228		Basketball
Talladega Nights: The Ballad of Ricky Bobby	2006	$163,362,095		Motor racing
The Cannonball Run	1981	$160,000,000		Motor racing
Ip Man 3	2015	$157,300,954		Martial arts
Rocky Balboa	2006	$156,229,050		Boxing
Cool Runnings	1993	$154,856,263		Bobsleigh
Surf's Up	2007	$149,044,513		Surfing
Seabiscuit	2003	$148,336,445		Horse racing
Blades of Glory	2007	$145,708,642		Ice skating
Herbie: Fully Loaded	2005	$144,146,816		Motor racing
Remember the Titans	2000	$136,706,683		American football
A League of Their Own	1992	$132,440,069		Baseball
Rocky V	1990	$119,946,358		Boxing
The Karate Kid Part II	1986	$115,103,979		Martial arts
42	2013	$97,470,701		Baseball
Speed Racer	2008	$93,945,766		Motor racing
The Karate Kid	1984	$91,000,640		Martial arts

== Box office ticket sales ==
The following is a list of sports films that have sold more than 10 million tickets worldwide. The Fast & Furious franchise has the most entries with six films on the list. Auto racing is the sport with the most entries with eight.

Film	Year	Known ticket sales (est.)	Sport	Ref
The Fate of the Furious	2017	241,900,000	Auto racing	
Furious 7	2015	199,233,440	Auto racing	(Note: Furious 7: United States and Canada – 41,938,896; Argentina, Australia, Brazil, Chile, China, Colombia, Mexico – 100,297,901; Austria, Belgium, Bosnia and Herzegovina, Bulgaria, Croatia, Czech Republic, Denmark, Estonia, Finland, France, Germany, Greece, Hungary, Iceland, Ireland, Latvia, Luxembourg, Montenegro, Morocco, Netherlands, North Macedonia, Norway, Poland, Portugal, Russia, Slovakia, Slovenia, Spain, Sweden, Turkey, United Kingdom – 33,601,457; India – 12,000,000; Bolivia, Lithuania, Paraguay, Peru, Switzerland, Ukraine, Uruguay – 3,872,927; South Korea – 3,248,904; Italy – 2,697,123; United Arab Emirates – 925,000; Romania – 651,232)
Ben-Hur	1959	141,823,187	Chariot racing	(Note: Ben-Hur admissions: United States and Canada – 98,046,900; South Korea (Seoul City) – 873,163; Other territories – 42,903,124)
Dangal	2016	140,000,000	Wrestling	(Note: Dangal admissions: India – 36,996,000; China – 44,897,623; United States and Canada – 1,406,400; Arabian Gulf states – 923,400; Taiwan – 730,000; Europe – 724,598; Hong Kong – 357,105; Australia – 190,580; South Korea – 109,500; Japan – 38,023)
Enter the Dragon	1973	139,000,000	Martial arts	(Note: Enter the Dragon – $400 million+ gross (as of 2001): 1973 – $100 million gross – 56 million tickets (Note: See Film industry § Average ticket price.); Up until 1980 – $220 million gross; 1974–1980 – $120 million gross – 45 million+ tickets; Up until 1997 – $300 million gross; 1981–1997 – $80 million gross – 17 million+ tickets; 1998–2001 – $100 million gross – 21 million+ tickets)
Disco Dancer	1982	135,000,000	Dance competition	(Note: Disco Dancer admissions: India – 15 million; Soviet Union – 120 million)
Forrest Gump	1994	100,522,518	American football / ping pong	(Note: Forrest Gump admissions: United States and Canada – 78,637,200; France, Germany, Italy, Spain – 18,065,321; Austria, Denmark, Finland, Netherlands, Sweden – 3,103,792; South Korea (Seoul City) – 705,143; Belgium, Czech Republic, Romania, Switzerland, United Kingdom (1996–2017) – 11,062)
Pegasus 3	2026	94,761,400	Rally racing	
F9	2021	82,400,000	Auto racing	
Fast & Furious 6	2013	76,700,000	Auto racing	
Cars 3	2017	75,100,000	Auto racing	
Pegasus 2	2024	70,136,500	Rally racing	
Kung Fu Soccer †	2026	67,877,500	Association football	
XXX: Return of Xander Cage	2017	67,700,000	Extreme sports	
Rocky	1975	67,339,279	Boxing	(Note: Rocky (1975) admissions: United States, Spain, France, Sweden – 59,813,000; United Kingdom – 6,000,000; Germany and Italy – 1,170,671; South Korea (Seoul City) – 355,608)
Smokey and the Bandit	1977	60,795,601	Auto racing	(Note: Smokey and the Bandit admissions: United States, Canada, Spain – 58,614,553; France and Germany – 2,181,048)
The Way of the Dragon	1972	59,936,292	Martial arts	(Note: The Way of the Dragon admissions: Hong Kong – 1,400,000; United States – 50,000,000; France and Germany – 5,502,004; Japan – 2,610,000; Bombay (New Excelsior theater) – 241,000 (eight weeks); South Korea (Seoul City) – 182,530; Denmark and Finland (2018–2019) – 758)
Rocky IV	1985	58,848,048	Boxing	(Note: Rocky IV admissions: United States – 36,224,000; France, Spain, Sweden – 7,587,671; Japan – 6,500,000; United Kingdom – 3,800,000; Germany – 3,309,379; Italy – 1,334,987; South Korea (Seoul City) – 92,011)
Rocky III	1982	54,423,966	Boxing	(Note: Rocky III admissions: USA, France, Germany, Italy – 46,664,464; Japan – 4,000,000; UK – 1,900,000; Spain and Sweden – 1,643,750; South Korea (Seoul City) – 215,752)
Fast & Furious	2009	44,200,000	Auto racing	
Cars	2006	42,000,000	Auto racing	
Pegasus	2019	41,155,000	Rally racing	
Rocky II	1979	40,860,797	Boxing	(Note: Rocky II admissions: United States – 35,199,000; United Kingdom – 4,000,000; France and Italy – 1,022,774; South Korea (Seoul City) – 244,234; Germany – 227,978; Sweden – 166,811)
Naya Daur (New Era)	1957	40,000,000	Horse racing / auto racing	
The Love Bug	1968	36,101,400	Auto racing	
Space Jam	1996	35,831,667	Basketball	
Rocky IV	1990	35,387,300	Boxing	
Ip Man 4: The Finale	2019	35,275,775	Martial arts	(Note: Ip Man 4: The Finale admissions: China – 33,364,600; Hong Kong – 300,000; Taiwan – 810,000; United States and United Kingdom – 459,523; France – 137,066; Other European countries – 131,700; South Korea – 72,886)
Sultan	2016	35,250,009	Wrestling	(Note: Sultan admissions: India – 32,085,000; China – 1,172,881; Arabian Gulf states – 899,265; United States and Canada – 716,763; Europe – 277,827; Australia – 97,899; South Korea – 374)
The Blind Side	2009	34,302,300	American football	
The Waterboy	1998	34,210,600	American football	
The First Slam Dunk	2022	31,069,024	Basketball	(Note: The First Slam Dunk admissions: Japan – 9,220,517; China – 15,491,500; South Korea – 4,597,007; Taiwan – 1,760,000)
The Karate Kid Part II	1986	31,025,300	Martial arts	
The Fast and the Furious	2001	27,800,000	Auto racing	
xXx	2004	27,200,000	Extreme sports	
The Karate Kid	1984	27,072,000	Martial arts	
Cars 2	2011	26,900,000	Auto racing	
The Longest Yard	2005	24,667,600	American football	
Smokey and the Bandit II	1980	24,584,600	Auto racing	
The Longest Yard	1974	22,999,000	American football	
2 Fast 2 Furious	2003	22,800,000	Auto racing	
Dodgeball	2004	20,610,100	Dodgeball	
Seabiscuit	2003	20,584,277	Horse racing	
Chariots of Fire	1981	20,060,900	Track and field	
Lagaan: Once Upon a Time in India	2001	20,041,477	Cricket	(Note: Lagaan admissions: India – 19,394,000; United Kingdom – 144,928; Mainland Europe, United States, Canada – 262,549; China – 240,000)
Mortal Kombat	1995	19,957,664	Martial arts	(Note: Mortal Kombat admissions: United States and United Kingdom – 17,138,454; France and Spain – 1,570,408; Other European countries – 1,248,802)
Space Jam: A New Legacy	2021	18,700,000	Basketball	
Dragon Ball Super: Broly	2018	18,600,000	Martial arts	(Note: Dragon Ball Super: Broly admissions: Japan – 3,009,730; Latin America – 7,220,416+; Mexico – 4,100,000; Peru – 1,122,971; Argentina – 808,055; Colombia (4 days) – 539,874; Chile (4 days) – 362,776; Brazil (day 1) – 106,000; Bolivia (1 week) – 91,968; Paraguay – 77,713; Uruguay (4 days) – 11,059; United States and Canada – 3,408,700; Europe – 1,518,016; France and Germany – 638,407; Other European countries – 879,609; China – 1,034,444; South Korea – 35,869)
Blades of Glory	2007	18,437,600	Figure skating	
Million Dollar Baby	2004	17,300,000	Boxing	
Cool Runnings	1993	16,613,200	Bobsleigh	
Field of Dreams	1989	16,229,600	Baseball	
Game of Death	1978	15,629,437	Martial arts	(Note: Game of Death admissions: Hong Kong – 900,000; United States and Canada – 5,300,000; Japan – 3,640,441; United Kingdom – 2,500,000; France – 2,256,892; Germany – 750,513; South Korea (Seoul City) – 281,591)
Caddyshack	1980	14,812,800	Golf	
Chak De! India	2007	13,984,400	Field hockey	(Note: Chak De admissions: India – 13,983,000; United States and Canada – 163,000; United Kingdom – 85,841; Norway – 1,400)
Ali	2001	13,040,096	Boxing	(Note: Ali: United States – 10,600,000; France – 1,035,360; United Kingdom – 1,000,000; Germany – 342,388; South Korea – 62,348)
Bhaag Milkha Bhaag	2013	12,610,615	Track and field	(Note: Bhaag Milkha Bhaag admissions: India – 12,369,000; United States and Canada – 201,213; United Kingdom – 40,400; Norway – 2)
Mortal Kombat	2021	11,100,000	Martial arts	
The Fast and the Furious: Tokyo Drift	2006	10,700,000	Drift racing	
Bend It Like Beckham	2002	10,675,490	Association football	
Mortal Kombat II	2026	10,500,000	Martial arts	

== Highest-grossing film franchises ==
† Background shading indicates that at least one film in the series is playing in the week commencing 20 November 2026 in theaters around the world.

(The films in each franchise can be viewed by selecting "show")

Rank	Series	Total worldwide box office	No. of films	Average per film	Highest-grossing film

1	Fast & Furious	$6,560,243,292	10	$656,024,329	Furious 7 ($1,515,342,457)
1	Furious 7 (2015)	$1,515,342,457			
2	The Fate of the Furious (2017)	$1,236,009,236			
3	Fast & Furious 6 (2013)	$788,683,342			
4	F9 (2021)	$726,229,501			
5	Fast X (2023)	$704,875,015			
6	Fast Five (2011)	$626,137,675			
7	Fast & Furious (2009)	$360,366,870			
8	2 Fast 2 Furious (2003)	$236,350,661			
9	The Fast and the Furious (2001)	$207,283,925			
10	Tokyo Drift (2006)	$158,964,610			

2
Rocky
$1,934,254,407
9
$214,917,156
Rocky IV ($300,373,716)

	Original series	$1,271,322,322	6	$211,887,054	Rocky IV ($300,473,716)
1	Rocky IV (1985)	$300,473,716			
2	Rocky III (1982)	$270,000,000			
3	Rocky (1976)	$225,000,000			
4	Rocky II (1979)	$200,182,160			
5	Rocky Balboa (2006)	$155,720,088			
6	Rocky V (1990)	$119,946,358			

	Creed series	$662,932,085	3	$220,977,362	Creed III ($275,248,615)
1	Creed III (2023)	$275,248,615			
2	Creed II (2018)	$214,115,889			
3	Creed (2015)	$173,567,581			

3
Cars
$1,648,204,863
4
$412,051,216
Cars 2 ($562,110,557)

	Main series	$1,410,237,541	3	$470,079,180	Cars 2 ($562,110,557)
1	Cars 2 (2011)	$562,110,557			
2	Cars (2006)	$464,196,328			
3	Cars 3 (2017)	$383,930,656			

Planes (2013)	$240,171,783

4	Pegasus	$1,381,198,013	3	$460,399,338	Pegasus 3 ($656,459,523)
1	Pegasus 3 (2026) †	$656,459,523			
2	Pegasus 2 (2024)	$468,905,664			
3	Pegasus (2019)	$255,832,826			

5	Gladiator	$927,696,965	2	$463,848,483	Gladiator ($37,799,643)
1	Gladiator (2000)	$465,516,248			
2	Gladiator II (2024)	$462,180,717			

6
Dragon Ball
$874,305,098
22
$39,741,141
Super: Broly ($122,747,755)

	Anime film series	$817,793,641	21	$38,942,554	Super: Broly ($122,747,755)
1	Curse of the Blood Rubies (1986) to Wrath of the Dragon (1995) (Note: The first sixteen Dragon Ball films, from Dragon Ball: Curse of the Blood Rubies (1986) to Dragon Ball Z: Wrath of the Dragon (1995), had a total Japanese box office gross of over ¥40 billion ($460 million). Outside of Japan, the 2002–2003 European releases of Dragon Ball Z: The World's Strongest (1990) grossed $1,009,767, the 2016 Chinese release of Dragon Ball: Mystical Adventure (1988) grossed $9,714,846, and the 2018 North American releases of Dragon Ball Z films Broly: The Legendary Super Saiyan (1993) and Saiyan Double Feature (Fusion Reborn and Bardock: The Father of Goku) grossed $1,199,689.)	$471,924,302			
2	Super: Broly (2018)	$122,747,755			
3	Super: Super Hero (2022)	$86,562,140			
4	Z: Resurrection 'F' (2015)	$70,798,088			
5	Z: Battle of Gods (2013) (Note: The film grossed $52,761,356 worldwide, including $32 million in Japan, $2.8 million in the US and Canada, and $17,961,356 in other territories.)	$52,761,356			
6	The Path to Power (1996) (Note: See Dragon Ball: The Path to Power § Box office)	$13,000,000			

Dragonball Evolution (2009)	$56,511,457

7	XXX	$694,434,926	3	$231,478,309	Return of Xander Cage ($345,963,851)
1	XXX: Return of Xander Cage	$345,963,851			
2	XXX	$277,448,382			
3	XXX: State of the Union	$71,022,693			

8	The Karate Kid	$675,583,585	5	$135,116,717	The Karate Kid ($359,126,022)
1	The Karate Kid (2010)	$359,126,022			
2	The Karate Kid (1984) to The Karate Kid Part III (1989)	$300,442,786			
3	The Next Karate Kid (1994)	$16,014,777			

9
Ip Man
$443,164,998
5
$88,633,000
The Finale ($192,617,891)

	Main series	$421,529,397	4	$105,382,349	The Finale ($192,617,891)
1	The Finale (2019)	$192,617,891			
2	Ip Man 3 (2015)	$157,300,954			
3	Legend of the Grandmaster (2010)	$49,721,954			
4	Ip Man (2008)	$21,888,598			

Master Z: Ip Man Legacy (2018)	$21,635,601

10	Space Jam	$413,872,612	2	$206,936,306	Space Jam ($250,180,384)
1	Space Jam (1996)	$250,180,384			
2	A New Legacy (2021)	$163,692,228			

11	Shaolin Soccer †	$387,516,760	2	$193,758,380	Kung Fu Soccer ($344,740,000)
1	Kung Fu Soccer (2026) †	$344,740,000			
2	Shaolin Soccer (2001)	$42,776,760			

12
Mortal Kombat
$387,468,922
4
$96,867,231
Mortal Kombat II ($129,470,110)

	Reboot series	$213,896,141	2	$106,948,071	Mortal Kombat II ($129,450,612)
1	Mortal Kombat II (2026)	$129,470,110			
2	Mortal Kombat (2021)	$84,426,031			

	Original series	$173,572,781	2	$86,786,391	Mortal Kombat ($122,195,920)
1	Mortal Kombat (1995)	$122,195,920			
2	Annihilation (1997)	$51,376,861			

13	Smokey and the Bandit	$373,132,626	3	$124,377,542	Smokey and the Bandit ($300,000,000)
1	Smokey and the Bandit (1977)	$300,000,000			
2	Smokey and the Bandit II (1980)	$66,132,626			
3	Smokey and the Bandit Part 3 (1983)	$7,000,000			

14	Herbie	$242,410,816	4	$60,602,704	Fully Loaded ($144,146,816)
1	Fully Loaded (2005)	$144,146,816			
2	The Love Bug (1968)	$51,264,000			
3	Herbie Goes to Monte Carlo (1977)	$29,000,000			
4	Herbie Goes Bananas (1980)	$18,000,000			

15	The Cannonball Run	$219,377,361	3	$73,125,787	The Cannonball Run ($160,000,000)
1	The Cannonball Run (1981)	$160,000,000			
2	Cannonball Run II (1984)	$56,300,000			
3	Cannonball Fever (1989)	$3,077,361			

16	Point Break	$217,250,669	2	$108,625,335	Point Break ($133,718,711)
1	Point Break (2015)	$133,718,711			
2	Point Break (1991)	$83,531,958			

17	Surf's Up	$153,219,656	2	$76,609,828	Surf's Up ($152,005,713)
1	Surf's Up (2007)	$152,005,713			
2	WaveMania (2017)	$1,213,943			

18	The Mighty Ducks	$119,317,844	3	$39,772,615	The Mighty Ducks ($50,752,337)
1	The Mighty Ducks (1992)	$50,752,337			
2	D2 The Mighty Ducks (1994)	$45,610,410			
3	D3: The Mighty Ducks (1996)	$22,955,097			

19	The Bad News Bears	$109,706,979	4	$27,426,745	The Bad News Bears ($42,349,782)
1	The Bad News Bears (1976)	$42,349,782			
2	Bad News Bears (2005)	$34,252,847			
3	The Bad News Bears in Breaking Training (1977)	$19,104,350			
4	The Bad News Bears Go to Japan (1978)	$14,000,000			

20	Death Race	$84,014,335	2	$42,007,168	Death Race ($76,014,335)
1	Death Race (2008)	$76,014,335			
2	Death Race 2000 (1975)	$8,000,000			

== Highest-grossing openings ==
The following is a list of biggest worldwide opening weekends for sports films of all time. Auto racing is the most frequent sport with 18 films on the list (including 10 of the top 12 entries), with the Fast & Furious series claiming more entries on the list (10) than any other franchise.

Film	Year	Opening weekend gross	Ref	Sport(s)
The Fate of the Furious	2017	$516,763,065		Auto racing
Pegasus 3	2026	$379,070,000		Rally racing
Furious 7	2015	$365,933,413		Auto racing
Inside Out 2	2024	$295,000,000		Ice Hockey
F9	2021	$304,099,937		Auto racing
Fast X	2023	$265,998,945		Auto racing
Fast & Furious 6	2013	$255,764,303		Auto racing
Fast Five	2011	$199,741,456		Auto racing
Alita: Battle Angel	2019	$161,231,295		Motorball (Note: A fictional sport with similar elements to roller derby)
Cars 2	2011	$157,924,198		Auto racing
Fast & Furious	2009	$136,633,050		Auto racing
Cars 3	2017	$121,260,461		Auto racing
Pegasus 2	2024	$104,608,572		Rally racing
The Karate Kid	2010	$103,827,807		Martial arts
Creed III	2023	$94,696,103		Boxing
Cars	2006	$89,306,972		Auto racing
Ip Man 3	2015	$79,190,886		Martial arts
Kung Fu Soccer	2026	$73,600,000		Association football
Real Steel	2011	$72,460,575		Boxing
XXX: Return of Xander Cage	2017	$71,600,000		Extreme sports
Creed II	2018	$65,587,388		Boxing
Turbo	2013	$60,759,156		Auto racing
Ford v Ferrari	2019	$57,760,168		Auto racing
2 Fast 2 Furious	2003	$57,404,831		Auto racing
The Longest Yard	2005	$54,301,055		American football
Planes	2013	$54,001,515		Air racing
xXx	2002	$53,211,708		Extreme sports
Talladega Nights: The Ballad of Ricky Bobby	2006	$51,300,298		Auto racing
Creed	2015	$50,973,881		Boxing
Need for Speed	2014	$49,727,492		Auto racing
Ip Man 4: The Finale	2019	$48,809,673		Martial arts
Space Jam: A New Legacy	2021	$47,573,630		Basketball
The Fast and the Furious	2001	$45,243,454		Auto racing
The Blind Side	2009	$44,507,840		American football
The Fast and the Furious: Tokyo Drift	2006	$43,468,119		Drift racing
Point Break	2015	$39,781,449		Surfing
The Waterboy	1998	$39,414,071		American football
Blades of Glory	2007	$38,933,790		Figure skating
Rocky Balboa	2006	$35,935,878		Boxing
Dodgeball: A True Underdog Story	2004	$35,665,598		Dodgeball
Gladiator	2000	$34,819,017		Gladiatorial combat
The Game Plan	2007	$34,649,403		American football
Surf's Up	2007	$34,535,788		Surfing
Speed Racer	2008	$33,394,925		Auto racing
Nacho Libre	2006	$31,673,706		Professional wrestling
Invictus	2009	$29,442,434		Rugby
Mortal Kombat	2021	$29,212,763		Martial arts
Moneyball	2011	$28,518,455		Baseball
Southpaw	2015	$27,536,916		Boxing
Space Jam	1996	$27,528,529		Basketball

== Timeline of gross records ==
=== Highest-grossing sports films ===
The following is a timeline of the highest-grossing sports films of all time. At least eight films have held the title, with Enter the Dragon claiming the longest reign. It is one of two martial arts films starring Bruce Lee to have held the title. Auto racing is the most frequent sport on the list with three films.

Title	Established	Record-setting gross	Sport(s)	Ref
National Velvet	1944	$5,840,000^{R}	Horse racing	
Naya Daur (New Era)	1957	$11,300,000	Horse racing / auto racing	
Ben-Hur	1959	$74,000,000^{*}	Chariot racing	
The Way of the Dragon (Return of the Dragon)	1972	$130,000,000	Martial arts	
Ben-Hur	1972	$146,900,000	Chariot racing	
Enter the Dragon	1973	$220,000,000	Martial arts	
Enter the Dragon	1977	$300,000,000	Martial arts	
Enter the Dragon	1985	$350,000,000	Martial arts	
Enter the Dragon	1994	$400,000,000	Martial arts	
Forrest Gump	1994	$677,382,863 (Note: Forrest Gump subsequently made $839,421 in rerelease revenue after its record had been surpassed.)	American football / ping pong	
Fast & Furious 6	2013	$788,679,850 (Note: Fast & Furious 6 subsequently made $3,492 in rerelease revenue after its record had been surpassed.)	Auto racing	
Furious 7	2015	$1,515,047,671	Auto racing	
Furious 7	2020	$1,515,342,457	Auto racing	
Inside Out 2	2024	$1,698,863,816	Ice Hockey	

^{R} Distributor rental earnings only.
^{*} US and Canada gross only.

=== Highest-grossing openings ===
The following is a timeline of the highest-grossing worldwide opening weekends for sports films of all time. At least 18 films have held the title, with Rocky IV claiming the longest reign, doing so for 9 years. Auto racing is the most frequent sport on the list with eight films.

Title	Established	Record-setting gross	Ref	Sport(s)
The Big Boss	1971	$167,000 (Note: Hong Kong only.)		Martial arts
Return of the Dragon (The Way of the Dragon)	1974	$1,435,000^{*} (Note: New York City and Chicago only.)	(Note: $1 million in New York City. $250,000 at Chicago's Oriental Theater. $185,000 at two other Chicago theaters.)	Martial arts
Rocky II	1979	$6,390,537^{*}		Boxing
Game of Death	1978	$8,000,000 (Note: Far East markets.)		Martial arts
Rocky III	1982	$16,015,408^{*}		Boxing
Rocky IV	1985	$19,991,537^{*}		Boxing
Forrest Gump	1994	$24,450,602^{*}		American football / ping pong
Space Jam	1996	$27,528,529^{*}		Basketball
The Waterboy	1998	$39,414,071^{*}		American football
The Fast and the Furious	2001	$45,243,454		Auto racing
xXx	2002	$53,211,708		Extreme sports
2 Fast 2 Furious	2003	$57,404,831		Auto racing
Cars	2006	$89,306,972		Auto racing
Fast & Furious	2009	$136,633,050		Auto racing
Fast Five	2011	$199,741,456		Auto racing
Fast & Furious 6	2013	$255,764,303		Auto racing
Furious 7	2015	$365,933,413		Auto racing
The Fate of the Furious	2017	$516,763,065		Auto racing

^{*} US and Canada gross only.

== Highest-grossing films by year ==
The following is a list of highest-grossing sports films by year. Auto racing is the most frequent sport with 21 films on the list, with the Fast & Furious series claiming more entries (nine) than any other franchise. For films with two totals listed (with one in parentheses), the first indicates its total gross over all releases, while the second indicates the gross for its initial release.

Year	Film	Worldwide gross	Sport(s)	Budget	Ref
1944	National Velvet	$5,840,000^{R}	Horse racing	$2,770,000	
1945	—	—	—	—	
1946	The Kid from Brooklyn	$5,490,000^{R}	Boxing	$1,450,000	
1947-1948	—	—	—	—	—
1949	The Stratton Story	$4,488,000^{R}	Baseball	$1,771,000	
1950-1956	—	—	—	—	—
1957	Naya Daur (New Era)	$11,300,000	Horse racing / auto racing	$290,000	
1958	—	—	—	—	
1959	Ben-Hur	$146,900,000 ($74,000,000^{*})	Chariot racing	$15,200,000	
1960	—	—	—	—	
1961	The Hustler	$7,600,000^{*}	Cue sports	$2,100,000	
1962-1963	—	—	—	—	—
1964	Man's Favorite Sport?	$6,000,000^{*}	Fishing	TBD	
1965	The Great Race	$25,300,000^{*}	Auto racing	$12,000,000	
1966	Grand Prix	$20,800,000^{*}	Auto racing	$9,000,000	
1967	—	—	—	—	
1968	The Love Bug	$51,264,022	Auto racing	TBD	
1969	Winning	$14,600,000^{*}	Auto racing	TBD	
1970	The Great White Hope	$9,325,000^{R}	Boxing	$9,870,000	
1971	Le Mans	$5,500,000^{R}^{*}	Auto racing	TBD	
1972	The Way of the Dragon (Return of the Dragon)	$130,000,000	Martial arts	$130,000	
1973	Enter the Dragon	$400,000,000	Martial arts	$850,000	
1974	The Longest Yard	$43,008,075	American football	$2,900,000	
1975	Rollerball	$30,000,000	Rollerball	$5,000,000–$6,000,000	
1976	Rocky	$225,000,000 ($77,100,000)^{R}	Boxing	$1,000,000	
1977	Smokey and the Bandit	$300,000,000 ($126,737,428)	Auto racing	$4,300,000	
1978	Heaven Can Wait	$81,640,278	American football	$6,000,000	
1979	Rocky II	$200,182,160 ($85,182,160)	Boxing	$7,000,000	
1980	Smokey and the Bandit II	$66,132,626	Auto racing	TBD	
1981	The Cannonball Run	$160,000,000	Auto racing	$16,000,000–$18,000,000	
1982	Rocky III	$270,000,000 ($124,146,897)	Boxing	$17,000,000	
1983	Cannonball Run II	$56,300,000	Auto racing	$18,000,000	
1984	The Karate Kid	$130,442,786	Martial arts	$8,000,000	(Note: See The Karate Kid § Box office)
1985	Rocky IV	$300,473,716 ($127,891,353)	Boxing	$28,000,000	
1986	The Karate Kid Part II	$130,000,000	Martial arts	TBD	
1987	Over the Top	$16,057,580	Arm wrestling	$25,000,000	
1988	Bull Durham	$50,888,729	Baseball	$9,000,000	
1989	Field of Dreams	$84,431,625	Baseball	$15,000,000	
1990	Rocky V	$119,946,358	Boxing	$42,000,000	
1991	Point Break	$83,531,958	Surfing	$24,000,000	
1992	A League of Their Own	$132,440,069	Baseball	$40,000,000	
1993	Cool Runnings	$154,856,263	Bobsleigh	$14,000,000	
1994	Forrest Gump	$678,226,465	American football / ping pong	$55,000,000	
1995	Babe	$254,134,910	Sheepdog trial	$30,000,000	
1996	Jerry Maguire	$273,552,592	American football	$50,000,000	
1997	Mortal Kombat Annihilation	$51,376,861	Martial arts	$30,000,000	
1998	The Waterboy	$185,991,646	American football	$23,000,000	
1999	Fight Club	$101,209,702	Martial arts	$63,000,000	
2000	Gladiator	$465,516,248	Gladiatorial combat	$103,000,000	
2001	The Fast and the Furious	$207,283,925	Auto racing	$38,000,000	
2002	xXx	$277,448,382	Extreme sports	$70,000,000	
2003	2 Fast 2 Furious	$236,350,661	Auto racing	$76,000,000	
2004	Million Dollar Baby	$216,763,646	Boxing	$30,000,000	
2005	The Longest Yard	$191,466,556	American football	$82,000,000	
2006	Cars	$461,991,867	Auto racing	$120,000,000	
2007	Surf's Up	$152,005,713	Surfing	$100,000,000	
2008	Speed Racer	$93,945,766	Auto racing	$120,000,000	
2009	Fast & Furious	$360,366,870	Auto racing	$85,000,000	
2010	The Karate Kid	$359,126,022	Martial arts	$40,000,000	
2011	Fast Five	$626,137,675	Auto racing	$125,000,000	
2012	Silver Linings Playbook	$236,412,453	American football / dance competition	$21,000,000	
2013	Fast & Furious 6	$788,683,342	Auto racing	$160,000,000	
2014	Need for Speed	$203,277,636	Auto racing	$66,000,000	
2015	Furious 7	$1,515,342,457	Auto racing	$190,000,000	
2016	Dangal	$340,000,000	Wrestling	$11,000,000	
2017	The Fate of the Furious	$1,236,009,236	Auto racing	$250,000,000	
2018	Creed II	$214,215,889	Boxing	$50,000,000	
2019	Alita: Battle Angel	$404,852,543	Motorball	$170,000,000	
2020	Leap	$124,965,617	Volleyball	TBD	
2021	F9	$726,229,501	Auto racing	$200,000,000–225,000,000	
2022	The First Slam Dunk	$257,548,133	Basketball	TBD	
2023	Fast X	$704,875,015	Auto racing	$340,000,000	
2024	Inside Out 2	$1,698,863,816	Ice hockey	$200,000,000	
2025	F1	$634,142,436	Auto racing	$200,000,000–300,000,000	
2026	Pegasus 3	$656,459,523	Rally racing	$70,000,000	

^{R} Distributor rental earnings only.
^{*} US and Canada gross only.
^{TBD} To be determined.

== See also ==
- Sports film
- List of sports films
- List of highest-grossing films
- Lists of highest-grossing films
