= Pegasus 3 (film) =

- Theatrical release poster
- Chinese: 飞驰人生3
- Hanyu Pinyin: Fēichí rénshēng 3
- Directed by: Han Han
- Written by: Han Han; Zhou Yunhai; Meng Wenyu
- Produced by: Han Han; Di Lu; Zhang Huixia; Ge Dandan; Yu Xiaoxue; Chen Minmin
- Starring: Shen Teng; Yin Zheng; Huang Jingyu; Zhang Benyu; Wei Xiang
- Cinematography: Bai Yuxia
- Edited by: Tang Qiang; Huangzeng Hongchen; Song Yang
- Music by: Roc Chen
- Production companies: PMF Pictures; Tianjin Maoyan Weiying Culture Media; Damai; Bona Film Group; China Film Group; Mahua; Wanda Film; Hengdian Film
- Distributed by: Tianjin Maoyan Weiying Culture Media
- Release date: 17 February 2026 (China)
- Running time: 125 minutes
- Country: China
- Language: Mandarin
- Box office: US$656.5 million

Pegasus 3 (Chinese: 飞驰人生3) is a 2026 Chinese sports comedy film written and directed by Han Han. It is the sequel to Pegasus (2019) and Pegasus 2 (2024) and the third installment in the Pegasus film series. The film's ensemble cast is led by Shen Teng, Yin Zheng, Huang Jingyu, Zhang Benyu, Wei Xiang, Sha Yi, Fan Chengcheng, Sun Yizhou, and Duan Yihong. It was released in China on 17 February 2026 (Chinese New Year) and has grossed $648.7 million, becoming the eight highest-grossing film of 2026 and the highest-grossing pure sports film of all time.

== Plot ==
After the curtain falls on the last Bayanbulak rally, Zhang Chi (Shen Teng) and friends return to their quiet lives, but the passion for racing in their hearts is hard to extinguish. The Muchen 100 Rally, in which many Asian countries are participating, is about to begin and the Chinese team's boss Bai Qiang (Sha Yi) invites Zhang Chi and Sun Yuqiang (Yin Zheng) to put together a national team to represent China in the competition. Lin Zhendong (Huang Jingyu) and other top racecar drivers join, but Zhang Chi discovers that the seemingly smooth journey is hiding a complex plot. Facing the scheming and murkiness of ordinary human relationships, he and his friends decide to embark on a more difficult path, to protect the purity of racing and their own dignity.

== Cast ==
Performer	Role	Description
Main characters
Shen Teng; Young: Wang Anyu	Zhang Chi	Former top racecar driver, "King of Bayanbulak"
Yin Zheng Young: Chen Yongsheng (陈永胜)	Sun Yuqiang	Zhang Chi's co-driver
Huang Jingyu	Lin Zhendong	A top racecar driver of the younger generation, fu'erdai
Zhang Benyu	Ji Xing	Zhang Chi's racecar mechanic
Wei Xiang	Manager Ye	Ridehail driver, former manager of Guangke racecar team, Zhang Chi's old acquaintance
The team
Sha Yi	Bai Qiang	Team boss
Duan Yihong	An Zhongzu	Team technical head
Zhang Xincheng	Li Lun	Racecar driver, team sponsor's son
Aarif Rahman	Chi Haisheng	Racecar driver
Feng Shaofeng	Team manager	Team manager
Rally selection team
Fan Chengcheng	Li Xiaohai	Rising racecar star
Sun Yizhou	Liu Xiande	Li Xiaohai's co-driver
Hu Xianxu	Liu Shihao	Racecar driver
Bai Yufan	Zhang Hongbin	Lin Zhendong's co-driver
Gao Huayang (高华阳)	Ye Jinlong	Racecar driver
Guest appearances
Harashima Daichi	Tetsuya Shirakawa	Japanese team racecar driver
Jia Bing	factory manager	Li Xiaohai's father
Zhou Guanyu	himself	First Chinese Formula 1 driver
Sébastien Loeb	himself	Racecar driver, prize announcer

== Soundtrack ==
	Song	Music	Lyrics	Performer
Opening credits	"Don't Stop Me Now"	Freddie Mercury	Freddie Mercury	Queen
Closing credits	Never Look Back (永远不回头)	Chen Chih-Yuan	Lo-Jung Chen	Shen Teng, Yin Zheng, Huang Jingyu, Zhang Benyu, Wei Xiang

== Production ==
Following the commercial success of Pegasus 2 in 2024, director Han Han and his team began developing the plot for the next film in the series. The film largely features the same cast and crew as Pegasus 2, but also has some returning cast members from the original Pegasus. Most of the main cast members have appeared with Shen Teng on Natural High (现在就出发) and Ace vs. Ace (王牌对王牌).

The project officially began in March 2025. Shooting began in August 2025 in Shanghai and finished in October of that year. The non-racing scenes were mostly filmed in Minhang, Shanghai, the big departure scene was filmed at Qingdao Liuting International Airport, Qingdao, and night racing was filmed on location at Zhenhai refinery in Ningbo Petrochemical Economic and Technological Development Zone. To create the Muchen 100 rally, the production team went to Jiulong County, Ganzi Prefecture, Sichuan; Delingha, Qinghai, and other places, filming on location at elevations of more than 4500 meters.

In addition, in pursuit of better visual effects, the production team also filmed in Oriental Movie Metropolis, where The Wandering Earth series was produced.

== Release ==
On 26 December 2025, it was announced that the film would be released on 17 February 2026 (Chinese New Year). It was the first Chinese New Year film to be announced for that year. On 9 February 2026, tickets went on sale, and it became the best-performing Chinese New Year film of the year at the box office.

Release date	Region	Distributor
17 February 2026	Mainland China	Tianjin Maoyan Weiying Culture Media
20 February 2026	Macau	C-Color Culture Entertainment, CMC Pictures
26 February 2026	Australia, New Zealand, Fiji, Papua New Guinea	CMC Pictures
27 February 2026	United States, Canada, United Kingdom, Ireland, Netherlands, Belgium, Luxembourg	CMC Pictures
