= Shen Teng =

Chinese comedian and actor (born 1979)

- 沈腾
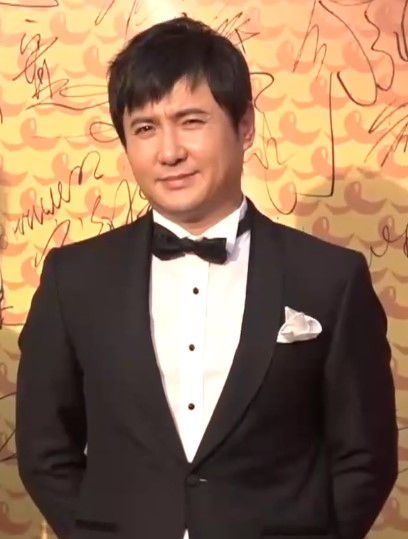
- Shen Teng in 2019
- Born: 23 October 1979 (age 47); Qiqihar, Heilongjiang, China
- Education: People's Liberation Army Academy of Art
- Occupations: Comedian, actor, director
- Years active: 2003–present
- Agent: Mahua Fun Age
- Spouse: Wang Qi (m. 2016)
- Children: 1

Chinese name
- Traditional Chinese: 沈騰
- Simplified Chinese: 沈腾
Transcriptions
Standard Mandarin
- Hanyu Pinyin: Shěn Téng

Shen Teng (born 23 October 1979) is a Chinese comedian, actor and director. He is known for starring in the films Goodbye Mr. Loser (2015), Never Say Die (2017), Hello Mr. Billionaire (2018), Crazy Alien (2019), the Pegasus film series, Hi, Mom (2021), Moon Man (2022), Full River Red (2023), Successor (2024) and Once Upon a Time in the Middle East (2026).

== Biography ==
Shen Teng was born in Qiqihar, Heilongjiang, China in 1979. He attended the People's Liberation Army Academy of Art in 1999 and received a bachelor's degree in 2003.

In 2003, he became a contracted artist of Happy Twist stage play. In 2012, he performed the sketch "Today's Happiness" on the CCTV Spring Festival Gala for the first time.

One of the most popular comedians in China, Shen has performed on CCTV's several New Year Galas and played the leading role in the film Goodbye Mr. Loser in 2015, which was his breakout film role. Since then, he has starred in films such as Hello Mr. Billionaire and Pegasus.

In 2020, he ranked 28th on Forbes China Celebrity 100 list.

With the success of Pegasus 2, Shen Teng edged out Wu Jing as the top-grossing actor in China, the combined revenue of his films adding up to about 33.5 billion yuan of 25 March 2024. Shen Teng starred in the comedy film Pegasus 2, which was the second-highest-grossing film in mainland China during the first half of the year.

He starred in the comedy film Successor, released in theatres on 16 July 2024.

== Acting experience ==
In 2003, Shen Teng joined the Happy Twist Drama Club. He starred in Happy Twist's first stage play "If you want to eat Twist, I'll twist it for you now". He also served as the assistant director of the play.

On January 22, 2012, he appeared on the CCTV Spring Festival Gala stage for the first time. Since then, Shen Teng's popularity has increased and his career has developed rapidly.

== Personal life ==
Shen married actress Wang Qi in March 2016, after 12 years of dating.

Their son was born in August 2018.

Shen Teng was the 'Red Ribbon Health Ambassador' and participated in the activity of 'I am the master of the beautiful youth – Red Ribbon Health Ambassador Youth Campus Tour'.

== Charity Activities ==
In 2006, served as the public welfare ambassador of Hongzhou Hainan International Marathon.

== Filmography ==
=== Film ===
Year	English title	Chinese title	Role	Notes
2014	Breakup Buddies	心花怒放	Boss	
2015	Go Away Mr. Tumor	滚蛋吧！肿瘤君	Xiong Dun's ex-boyfriend	
2015	Goodbye Mr. Loser	夏洛特烦恼	Xia Luo	
2015	Heart for Heaven	一念天堂	Shen Mo	
2016	Mr. Nian	年兽大作战	God of Earth (voice)	
2016	Ice Age: Collision Course	冰原历险记：笑星撞地球	Buck (voice)	Mandarin dub
2016	Mission Milano	王牌逗王牌	KK	
2017	Never Say Die	羞羞的铁拳	Zhang Zhuyu	
2017	Gold Buster	妖铃铃	Xu Dafu	
2018	Lobster Cop	龙虾刑警	Shopowner	
2018	Hello Mr. Billionaire	西虹市首富	Wang Duoyu	
2018	Hello, Mrs. Money	李茶的姑妈	Pastor	
2019	Crazy Alien	疯狂的外星人	Shen Tengfei	
2019	Pegasus	飞驰人生	Zhang Chi	
2020	Lost in Russia	囧妈	a passenger	
2020	My People, My Homeland	我和我的家乡	Ma Liang	
2020	Warm Hug	温暖的抱抱	Doctor Jia	
2021	Hi, Mom	你好，李焕英	Shen Guanglin	
2021	Overall Planning	日不落酒店		
2021	My Country, My Parents	我和我的父辈	Xing Yihao	also as director
2021	To Be With You	我的青春有个你	Director	
2022	Only Fools Rush In	四海		
2022	Moon Man	独行月球	Dugu Yue	
2023	Full River Red	满江红	Zhang Da	
2023	Wonder Family	超能一家人	Chichikov	
2024	Pegasus 2	飞驰人生2	Zhang Chi	
2024	Successor	抓娃娃	Ma Chenggang	
2024	Untouchable	逆鳞	Zun Fei	
2025	Pegasus 3	飞驰人生3	Zhang Chi	
2026	Once Upon a Time in the Middle East	欢迎来龙餐馆	Xu Fu	

=== Television ===
Year	English title	Chinese title	Role	Notes
2001	The Northeast Family	东北一家人	Ma Erhu	
2002	The Woman in the Enclosure	围屋里的女人	Cao Yuanji	
2005	Time Difference between Husband and Wife	夫妻时差	Mai Dong	
2006	Crime Scene II	案发现场II	Xia Xiaoqiang	
2007	The Youth	青春正步走	Chang Heping	
2012	Genius Evolution	天才进化论	Wu Yuming	
2012	Beijing Youth	北京青年	Yin Qiang	
2012	Diors Man	屌丝男士	Colleague	
2014	Everybody Loves	人见人爱	Hao Jian	
2015	You are My Eyes	你是我的眼	Zhang Sanjin	
2017	Happy Mitan	欢喜密探	Shen Laojian	
2017	Super Medical Resident	高能医少	Teacher Zhong	

=== Variety shows ===
Year	Title	Chinese title	Role	Notes
2023	Natural High	现在就出发	Cast Member	
2024	Natural High; Season:2	现在就出发	Cast Member	
2025	Natural High; Season:3	现在就出发	Cast Member	

== Awards and nominations ==
Year	Nominated work	Award	Category	Result	Notes
2019	Pegasus	17th Pyongyang International Film Festival	Best Actor	Won	
2019	Crazy Alien	11th Macau International Movie Festival	Best Actor	Nominated	
2020	Pegasus	Huading Awards	Best Film Actor	Nominated	
2022	My Country, My Parents	36th Hundred Flowers Awards	Best Actor	Nominated	
2024	Natural High; Season 1: Start Now	Tencent Video TV And Movie Award	Variety Show Star of the Year	Won	
2025	Natural High; Season 2: Lets Go Now	Tencent Video TV And Movie Award	Popular Variety Show Group of the Year	Won	
