= Mahua FunAge =

Mahua FunAge (Chinese: 开心麻花娱乐文化传媒股份有限公司) is a Chinese comedy film and stage play production company which was founded in 2003. It is based in Beijing. It was founded by Zhang Chen and Liu Hongtao. Mahua FunAge produces comedy films, comedy musicals, children plays, online TV series and films. It has formed its own system in many years of stage drama creation. It is also the pioneer to establish a business model for comedy show in large theaters of 1000+ seats.

== History ==
In 2003, Mahua FunAge was founded and firstly invented the concept of "New Year stage play", then the first comedy work "Make Mahua to you" came out. Since 2003, Mahua FunAge has launched 25 original stage plays that have independent intellectual property rights. In this time, Mahua FunAge has gradually become the popular comedy brand in the field of domestic stage drama. In 2008, Mahua FunAge launched "Smile" series of stage plays, which is a milestone in the development of Mahua FunAge. And Mahua FunAge established several subsidiaries in Shenzhen, Shanghai and Tianjin in 2011. In 2012, Mahua FunAge debut on the Spring Festival Gala and performed the original sketch comedy "Today's happiness". It thus was known by the national audience. In the same year, it created China's first weekly online sitcom "Mahua FunAge theater" on Letv. In 2013, Mahua FunAge won the investment of China's cultural industry investment fund. In 2015, Mahua FunAge produced movie "Goodbye Mr. Loser", which grossed 1 billion 450 million yuan at the box office. Film and television business has become a double engine of Mahua FunAge. In 2015, Mahua FunAge landed on New Third Board.

== Production ==
=== Stage play ===
Stage play is its main production. More than ten years, more than 20 works, the living theatre of Mahua FunAge from Beijing traveled to Shanghai, Shenzhen, Guangzhou, Tianjin, Wuhan, Nanjing and other more than 40 cities. And the number of performance is more than 2000 a year. Famous works include "Make Mahua to you" (2003.12), "People drift in rivers and lakes" (2005.12), "Amuse landlord" (2006.12), "Crazy stone" (2007.08), "Somali pirates" (2009.11), "The Earl of Mount Wulong (2010.12), "Rotating Carmen" (2011.11), "to board the pirate ship" (2011.12), "Goodbye Mr. Loser" (2012.11), "Never Say Die" (2014.11), "Li Cha's aunt" (2015.11) and so on.

=== TV show ===
Since 2012, Mahua FunAge has expanded to film and television and new media industry. Mahua FunAge's skit programs had five times on the stage of Spring Festival Gala in 2012, 2013, 2014, 2015 and 2017, which helped it expand its influence across China. At the same time, Mahua FunAge comedy team has participated in variety shows "Top Funny Comedian" (Season 1-3) for three consecutive years in 2015, 2016 and 2017. And in 2015, the team led by Shen Teng won the championship.

=== Movie ===
In 2015, Mahua FunAge officially entered the movie industry, the movie "Goodbye Mr Loser" created by Mahua FunAge was a phenomenal movie and a black horse movie at the same time. It became the box office runner for Chinese 2D movie at 1 billion 450 million yuan of the box office. In 2016, the movie "Mr. Donkey" became the movie had the highest rate of return in the year with a box office rate of 476%. At the same time, its score on the Douban movie is as high as 8.3, which is higher than most of the domestic movies last year. In 2017, the movie "Never Say Die" refurbished the box office record of China's 2D movie at the box office of 2 billion yuan. It also became the box office champion of China's National Day Golden Week in 2017.

== Artists ==
Mahua FunAge pays attention to training and forming a talent team in the process of development. At present, it has a professional creative team and hundreds of artists. The creative team has Yan Fei, Peng Damo, Wu Yuhan, Song Yang, Yang Yuanhan, Wei Xiang, Huang Cailun. And there are Shen Teng, Ma Li, Alan, Chang Yuan, Chen Haoming, Du Xiaoyu, Han Yunyun, Wang Ning, Wang Chengsi, Wang Yuanhu, Yang Xiaoming and other domestic popular comedians.
