= Crazy Alien =

2019 a Chinese film directed by Ning Hao

- Theatrical release poster
- Traditional Chinese: 瘋狂的外星人
- Simplified Chinese: 疯狂的外星人
- Literal meaning: Crazy Alien
- Hanyu Pinyin: Fēngkuáng de Wàixīngrén
- Directed by: Ning Hao
- Written by: Sun Xiaohang; Wu Nan; Dong Runnian; Liu Xiaodan; Pan Yiran
- Based on: "The Village Teacher" by Liu Cixin
- Produced by: Zhou Difei; Hu Jingxuan; Ning Hao; Jeffrey Sharp; Wang Yibing
- Starring: Huang Bo; Shen Teng; Matthew Morrison; Tom Pelphrey
- Cinematography: Liao Ni; Du Jie
- Edited by: Du Yuan
- Music by: Nathan Wang; Liang Long; Nan Song
- Production company: Huanxi Media Group Limited
- Distributed by: Khorgas Enlight Media; Shannan Enlight Media; Wuxi Baotang Media
- Release date: 5 February 2019 (China)
- Running time: 116 minutes
- Country: China
- Language: Mandarin
- Box office: $327.6 million

Crazy Alien (Chinese: 疯狂的外星人; pinyin: Fēngkuáng de Wàixīngrén) is a 2019 Chinese science-fiction comedy film directed by Ning Hao and written by Sun Xiaohang, Wu Nan, Dong Runnian, Liu Xiaodan, and Pan Yiran. It is partially based on the short story "The Village Teacher" by Liu Cixin. The third installment in Ning's "Crazy" series, the film stars Huang Bo and Shen Teng as the lead roles. It was released in China on Chinese New Year, February 5, 2019.

== Plot ==
An alien diplomat (Xu Zheng) is sent to Earth to establish intergalactic diplomatic relations. A superpower nation called "Armenika" (a portmanteau of Armenia and the United States) selfishly hide this contact with alien life, believing they are "the most advanced civilization on earth" and therefore have the sole right to do so. However, the alien resents its assignment due to the requirement to interact with lower life forms. The treaty must be signed by exchanging DNA which is performed by putting a ball into the mouth and coating it with saliva. Captain Zach Andrews (Note: Named after former basketball player Zach Andrews.) (Matthew Morrison), through his own sense of self-importance, fumbles the signing of the treaty when he takes a selfie, and the alien interprets the flash as a sign of aggression. A satellite hits the alien spaceship, causing it to tumble out of orbit, landing in an amusement park.

Two Chinese men working at the park, monkey trainer Geng Hao (Huang Bo) (Note: Both the character and the actor who played him came from Crazy Racer. Huang also starred in Crazy Stone.) and his business-savvy wine merchant friend Shen Tengfei (Shen Teng), find the crashed alien spaceship, mistaking the alien diplomat for an exotic South American monkey, and remove the alien's headband. Having been in the circus monkey business their entire life, they do not know anything else, so they begin to train the alien as a performing monkey, much to the diplomat's disgust. Meanwhile, Armenika sends John Stockton (Note: Named after Basketball Hall of Famer John Stockton.) (Tom Pelphrey), their top operative, to search for the alien. The alien manages to take photographs of its surroundings by gaining access to its headband for brief periods of time, one of its gadgets apparently being a camera. Due to the setting being an amusement park, it has many replicas of famous architectural monuments around the world. The Armenikan agents intercept the transmission of the photographs, believing it to be in those locations, they go to Moscow and the pyramids of Giza, shooting everyone along the way and eventually discovering the alien.

Meanwhile, Geng and Shen differ in opinion on what to do with the "monkey". Geng wishes to sell it but Shen instead wishes to make it a successful performer. The alien regains access to its headband which gives it telekinetic powers and confronts the two men, turning the tables and forcing them to perform for its amusement. It demands Geng to sign the treaty by putting a new ball in his mouth, but he misunderstands and swallows the ball. They outsmart the alien, getting the alien very drunk, believing they have killed it, immerse its body in alcohol, planning to sell it. When the Armenikans arrive they hide the alien by dressing up their performing monkey in the alien's suit. They are taken with the disguised monkey to the Armenikan embassy, and the Armenikans interrogate them about the alien. They agree to help. Extracting the ball from his feces, Geng presents it to Stockton, who proceeds to sign the treaty. The two men successfully pass off the monkey as the alien, performing their usual monkey show but with commentary explaining the fine points of intergalactic diplomatic etiquette and are let go. Stockton is told by a forensic scientist that the DNA they extracted from the ball was from a monkey, himself and an Asian man's feces. Discovering that he had been tricked, Stockton pursues the two men.

Upon returning home, Geng and Shen discover the alien has resurrected. Stockton follows and arrives shortly after. A final battle ensues and ends with the two Chinese men getting drunk with the alien, signing the treaty with a third and final ball and the alien telekinetically taking all the alcohol home with it.

== Cast ==
- Huang Bo as Geng Hao
- Shen Teng as Shen "Big Fei" Tengfei
- Xu Zheng as the Alien
- Matthew Morrison as Captain Zach Andrews
- Tom Pelphrey as John Stockton
- Kat Ann Nelson as CIA Agent
- Mekael Turner as CIA Agent
- David Rayden as Meeting Host
- Nathaniel Boyd as Assistant to the Secretary of Defense
- Mathieu Jaquet as Bodyguard
- Michael J. Gralapp as NASA Commander
- Anthony Gavard as NASA Scientist
- Dan Darin-Zanco as Chief NASA Administrator
- Randall Lowell as National Security Council Member
- Scotty Cox as Scientist
- Deng Fei as Director Ma
- Daniel Hugh Kelly as the President of the United States

== Production ==
Ning Hao stated that Crazy Alien is partly influenced by "The Village Teacher" written by Liu Cixin. He spent five years writing a script. Crazy Alien is the final installment in Ning Hao's black comedy trilogy. It began in 2006 with Crazy Stone, continuing with 2009's Crazy Racer.

Shooting began in Qingdao, Shandong on July 26, 2017 and ended on December 9 of that same year. Filming locations included Qingdao, Changsha, Russia and France.

== Animal abuse controversy ==
=== PETA's account ===
In March 2018, a video surfaced showing a dog being spun around in a cage and dumped into cold water. The video was taped by a member of the movie crew. There was a claim that between shots, the dog was worked into a frenzy so he would bark as loudly as possible, and that this had been done on several takes. The director did not give a statement, but Crazy Alien actor Matthew Morrison said he was heartbroken after seeing the video.

=== Studio's response ===
The studio responded that the dog did fall into the water twice. They however contradicted PETA's account, arguing that the dogs were under the supervision and ownership of expert contractors and appropriate tents had been set up to dry the dogs with heating equipment. Several takes occurred without problem. On the final two takes the equipment failed resulting in the dog falling into the water. After the second failure the decision was made not to proceed but to use CGI. An empty cage was then repeatedly dropped into the water to be later combined with CGI. No animals sustained any injuries. Ning Hao purchased the dog from a canine training school, which he personally vetted before hiring them to ensure the dogs were treated well, and it now lives in his family home. He named the dog "August 1st" (Chinese: 八一), the anniversary of the founding of the People's Liberation Army. Ning has invited journalists to his home to ensure that the dog is in good health and is treated well.

== Release ==
Crazy Alien was released in China on February 5, 2019.

== Reception ==
=== Box office ===
The film earned a total of 1 billion yuan in its first 3 days of release, grossing 1,500 million yuan on its opening weekend. It has grossed nearly 2,000 million yuan.
