= Pegasus (film) =

2019 film directed by Han Han

- Theatrical release poster
- Traditional Chinese: 飛馳人生
- Simplified Chinese: 飞驰人生
- Literal meaning: high-speed life
- Hanyu Pinyin: Fēichí rénshēng
- Directed by: Han Han
- Written by: Han Han
- Produced by: Liu Rong; Cary Cheng Kim-Fung; Li Wenwen; Zhu Yuming; Chen Minmin; Edward Cheng
- Starring: Shen Teng; Huang Jingyu
- Cinematography: Bai Yuxia
- Edited by: Bai Yuxia; Tan Yukun
- Music by: Chan Kwong-wing
- Distributed by: China Media Capital (China); Cina Asia (UK)
- Release dates: February 5, 2019 (China and UK)
- Running time: 98 minutes
- Country: China
- Language: Mandarin
- Box office: $255.8 million

Pegasus (Chinese: 飞驰人生) is a 2019 Chinese comedy film directed and written by Han Han, starring Shen Teng and Huang Jingyu. The film was released in China and other territories on February 5, 2019, marking Lunar New Year.

A second film, Pegasus 2, was released on February 10, 2024. A drama series adaptation started streaming on February 28, 2024. A third film, Pegasus 3, was released on February 17, 2026.

== Plot ==
Zhang Chi (Shen Teng) has dreamed of becoming a rally driver since he was a child. In his racing career, he has won the prestigious and dangerous Bayanbulak Rally five times, and by age 32 he has reached his prime, having won the highest honour in Chinese racing. However, for financial reasons he gets involved in illegal drift racing, and after being caught he is suspended from racing for five years.

During the five-year suspension, Zhang is left caring for an orphan child, Zhang Fei, bringing him up as his own son. His reputation ruined, he relies on working at a fried-rice stall and a book stall to support his family. However he never gives up on his racing dream, and just wants to regain his honour in front of his son as soon as he can. Forbidden to drive, Zhang abides by the law and keeps up his skills by using household objects to simulate rally driving.

After his suspension is up, Zhang successfully appeals for his racing licence to be reinstated. Zhang Chi reunites with his old co-driver Sun Yuqiang (Yin Zheng), who quits his job as a mascot at an amusement park to join Zhang. In the meantime, Lin Zhendong (Huang Jingyu) has become the most famous rally driver today and the new king of the Bayanbulak Rally. Left feeling unchallenged by dominating the rally scene, Lin meets with Zhang and challenges him to see who is the real king of Bayanbulak.

Zhang and Sun return to their old racing team but they refuse to hire them back, citing the reputational damage Zhang had done to them. Zhang and Sun steal the chassis of their old rally car from them and reunites with the former head of their pit crew, Ji Xing (Zhang Benyu). He tells them they need to find millions in new sponsorship money to rebuild the car. Zhang secures the money through various means and enters the Bayanbulak Rally. An accident on the way to the rally wrecks their car, but Ji rebuilds it in time with the help of Lin's team.

Lin dominates the rally while many other competitors crash out but Zhang remains competitive. Although Lin sets a scorching final time, Zhang Chi wins the rally but after he crosses the finish line his car malfunctions and he flies off a cliff. The film ends as the car is flying through the air.

== Cast ==
- Shen Teng as Zhang Chi
- Huang Jingyu as Lin Zhengdong
- Yin Zheng as Sun Yuqiang
- Zhang Benyu as Ji Xing
- Yin Fang as Hong Kuo
- Yu Tian as Driving School Instructor
- Zhao Wenxuan (Winston Chao) as Wan Heping
- Tengger as Big Brother
- Feng Shaofeng as Japanese Drift Master
- Sui He as Sun Yuqiang's Wife
- Li Qingyu as Zhang Fei
- Xiaoxing Yi as Gao Huayang
- Niall McShea as Himself

== Production ==
This film is based on director Han Han's personal story and is based on the real story of Xu Lang, the enlightenment teacher of Han Han Racing. He was competing in a rally, racing for Zhengzhou Nissan, and died aged 31 years old the day after being injured when he had stopped to help a fellow racer that had crashed in a rallying accident. The character of Lin Zhengdong is based on Han Han's friend Zhang Zhengdong and the character of Sun Yuqiang is based on Han Han's true pilot call Sun Qiang. The word "dedication" (奉献) sees frequent use in Pegasus because Han Han wanted to use this film to tell the story of how he dedicated his life to racing.

"Everyone can dream, but there are only a handful of people chasing dreams. Even fewer people persist to the end. The happiest thing for a person is to dedicate his life to the things he loves."

== Music ==
=== Soundtrack ===
- "Half a Life" (一半人生) by Ashin.
- "How are you brother" (大哥你好吗) by Shen Teng&Tengger
- "Fei Chi De Ren Sheng" (飞驰的人生) by laolang
- "Dedication" (奉献) by Han Han
- "A Number on My Back" by John Williamson

== Marketing ==
In early August 2018, Han Han made a public announcement of Pegasus (飞驰人生) on Weibo, the early promotion of the film involved him uploading behind the scenes footage of himself and some of the main cast. A thirty-second teaser trailer was released on October 4, 2018.

== Reception ==
=== Box office ===
Within the first two days of its release Pegasus generated 500 million RMB in box office revenue, and in the following week its revenue reached over a billion RMB.

=== Accolades ===
Pegasus was nominated at the 2019 Golden Rooster Awards for Best Sound and Best Editor.
