= Hello Mr. Billionaire =

- Chinese poster
- Chinese: 西虹市首富
- Literal meaning: The Richest Man in Xihong City
- Hanyu Pinyin: Xīhóng shì shǒufù
- Directed by: Yan Fei; Peng Damo
- Written by: Peng Damo; Yan Fei; Lin Bingbao
- Based on: Brewster's Millions by George Barr McCutcheon
- Produced by: Jon Chiew; Chi Ma; Tian Tian
- Starring: Shen Teng; Vivian Sung; Zhang Yiming; Chang Yuan (actor)
- Cinematography: Ming Sun
- Edited by: Huang Yiqiong
- Music by: Fei Peng
- Production company: Fun Age Pictures
- Release date: 27 July 2018 (China)
- Running time: 118 minutes
- Country: China
- Language: Mandarin
- Box office: CN¥2.506 billion(US$367 million)

Hello Mr. Billionaire (Chinese: 西虹市首富; pinyin: Xī Hóng Shì Shǒu Fù) is a 2018 comedy film written and directed by Yan Fei and Peng Damo, starring Shen Teng, Song Yunhua, Zhang Yiming, Chang Yuan, Zhang Chenguang, Wei Xiang, etc. It was released in mainland China on July 27, 2018., loosely based on the 1902 novel Brewster's Millions, and the 1985 film of the same name. It was released in China on 27 July 2018.

== Plot ==
Wang Duoyu is an unsuccessful goalie for Daxiang, a third-level soccer team. After he was discovered to have engaged in match-fixing in a soccer match, losing 0–5 to the opponents, he was nearly dismissed by the team's coach.

Later, he discovered that he is the heir of a billionaire, and could inherit as much as CN¥30 billion. But to receive his bequest, he must manage to spend ¥1 billion in thirty days. If he succeeds, he will inherit ¥30 billion, but there are a few rules he must follow: he must not tell anyone about his mission, must spend all the money on himself, must not spend money on charity or illegal activities like gambling, and must not own any assets at the end. It was also announced that he would have a personal financial assistant keeping track of his spendings, who turns out to be Xia Zhu.

Wang Duoyu soon began spending his money. He rented an entire hotel for a month at a price of ¥20 million, invested in sunset industries and unfulfilled dreams, and funded the production of a land-swimming machine, hoping that this would help him lose money. However, in the end, his investments surprisingly brought in another billion, doubling his original 1 billion yuan. He also spent ¥10 million to invite Changzhou Hengtai, the top soccer team in the country, for a friendly match against Daxiang.

At the same time, Wang Duoyu started to have a crush on Xia Zhu. One day, he decided to show fireworks to her. Coincidentally, this day was also Xia Zhu's birthday. The next day, Wang Duoyu purchased all billboards in the city to tell people that he loves Xia Zhu, much to her annoyance.

Shortly after that, Wang Duoyu introduced in front of a large crowd his newest insurance product, the "fat insurance", as a way to quickly get rid of his 2 billion yuan. This worked out well, and everyone in the city began to lose weight by exercising.

The day of the friendly match arrived, and Hengtai's captain demanded that his team must score double-digit goals. By the 50th minute, Hengtai had already scored 9 against Daxiang, but Daxiang defended well for the rest of the match, keeping the score at 9–0.

After the match, Wang Duoyu found that Xia Zhu had been abducted, and would die if he did not arrive and pay ¥10 million before 6 PM that day. Since this would violate the rules, Wang Duoyu hesitated for a while, but he ultimately decided to go and pay the money to rescue Xia Zhu. Finally, this was revealed to be the ultimate requirement for inheriting the 30 billion yuan.

At the end of the film, Wang Duoyu and Xia Zhu got married and wanted to donate their 30 billion yuan to charity, but asked to keep all the money needed to raise a child, which turned out to be a massive amount that they couldn't work out well into the night.

== Cast ==
- Shen Teng as Wang Duoyu
- Vivian Sung as Xia Zhu
- Zhang Yiming
- Zhang Chenguang
- Chang Yuan (actor)
- Wei Xiang
- Lee Li-Chun
- Jiu Kong
- Wang Chengsi
- Yang Haoyu
- Xu Dongdong as Sha Sha
- Bao Beier
- Wang Leehom (himself)

== Soundtrack ==
The single "Calorie" by Rocket Girls 101 appeared in this film's soundtrack.

== Preproduction ==
At first, the director wanted Shen Teng to lose weight, so Shen Teng went to the gym to apply for a card, hired a personal trainer, and ran 5 kilometers every day. As a result, his ankle and hip joints were injured and he couldn't exercise, so he asked Shen Teng to gain weight and keep his weight under control. He then maintained a weight of about 163 pounds.

In order to adapt to the role of a fat man, Zhang Yiming stretched out his belly to develop obesity marks, and ended up gaining more than 175 pounds.

Peng Damo had the most difficult time filming the football scene. The football scene in the film was shot for more than 20 days. It was originally planned to only show a few minutes, but because it was too laborious to shoot, he was reluctant to delete it, and finally it was left in the final film. The final scene lasted more than ten minutes.

== Reception ==
=== Box office ===
The film has earned CN¥2.547 billion at the Chinese box office, making it one of the highest-grossing Chinese films of the year as well as the 31st highest-grossing film in China.
