= List of highest-grossing biographical films =

The following is a list of the highest-grossing biographical films of all time, ranked by worldwide box office revenue. Biographical films, commonly known as biopics, depict the lives of real people. The rankings are based on each film's lifetime worldwide theatrical gross as reported by reliable box office sources and are not adjusted for inflation.

== Highest-grossing biopics ==
† Background shading indicates films playing in the week commencing 6 November 2026 in theaters around the world.

Rank	Film	Year	Gross	Subject(s)	Ref
1	Michael	2026	$1,028,597,887	Michael Jackson	
2	Oppenheimer	2023	$983,148,052	J. Robert Oppenheimer	
3	Bohemian Rhapsody	2018	$911,027,169	Freddie Mercury and Queen	
4	Hi, Mom	2021	$821,674,419	Jia Ling and Li Huanying	
5	The Passion of the Christ	2004	$612,054,506	Jesus	
6	American Sniper	2014	$547,659,020	Chris Kyle	
7	The Revenant	2015	$532,950,503	Hugh Glass	
8	The Conjuring: Last Rites	2025	$499,256,445	Ed and Lorraine Warren	
9	The Greatest Showman	2017	$471,812,742	P. T. Barnum	
10	The Eight Hundred	2020	$461,421,559	Xie Jinyuan	
11	The Last Samurai	2003	$456,810,575	Saigō Takamori and Emperor Meiji	
12	300	2006	$456,082,343	Leonidas I and Xerxes I	
13	Dying to Survive	2018	$451,183,391	Lu Yong	
14	The Intouchables	2011	$426,590,315	Philippe Pozzo di Borgo and Abdel Sellou	
15	The Captain	2019	$417,282,021	Liu Chuanjian	
16	The King's Speech	2010	$414,245,125	George VI	
17	The Wolf of Wall Street	2013	$407,039,432	Jordan Belfort	
18	Once Upon a Time...in Hollywood	2019	$392,105,159	Sharon Tate, Charles Manson, Bruce Lee	
19	Once Upon a Time in the Middle East †	2026	$373,000,000	Chen Xianzhong, Liu Lei, Shuai Xuejun	
20	Apollo 13	1995	$355,237,933	Jim Lovell, Jack Swigert, Fred Haise, Mattingly	
21	Catch Me If You Can	2002	$352,114,312	Frank Abagnale	
22	Pocahontas	1995	$347,100,000	Pocahontas	
23	Dangal	2016	$340,000,000	Mahavir Singh Phogat and Phogat sisters	
24	300: Rise of an Empire	2014	$337,580,051	Xerxes I, Darius the Great, Artemisia I of Caria	
25	Schindler's List	1993	$322,161,245	Oskar Schindler	
26	Green Book	2018	$321,752,656	Don Shirley and Tony Lip	
27	The Conjuring 2	2016	$321,370,008	Ed and Lorraine Warren	
28	The Conjuring	2013	$320,415,166	Ed and Lorraine Warren	
29	A Beautiful Mind	2001	$316,791,257	John Forbes Nash	
30	The Blind Side	2009	$309,231,694	Michael Oher	
31	The Pursuit of Happyness	2006	$307,127,625	Chris Gardner	
32	Never Say Never	2023	$304,280,699	En Bo, Su Mudaerji, Enbo Fight Club	
33	Shakespeare in Love	1998	$289,317,794	William Shakespeare	
34	Elvis	2022	$288,670,284	Elvis Presley	
35	The Sound of Music	1965	$286,213,233	Trapp Family	
36	Lincoln	2012	$275,293,450	Abraham Lincoln	
37	American Gangster	2007	$269,755,430	Frank Lucas	
38	Exodus: Gods and Kings	2014	$268,175,631	Moses and Ramesses II	
39	Erin Brockovich	2000	$257,851,763	Erin Brockovich	
40	American Hustle	2013	$251,171,807	Mel Weinberg	
41	Sound of Freedom	2023	$250,570,396	Tim Ballard	
42	Sully	2016	$243,870,033	Sully Sullenberger	
43	Hidden Figures	2016	$235,956,898	Katherine Johnson and Dorothy Vaughan	
44	The Imitation Game	2014	$233,555,708	Alan Turing	
45	Argo	2012	$232,325,503	Tony Mendez	
46	Annabelle Comes Home	2019	$231,252,591	Ed and Lorraine Warren	
47	Out of Africa	1985	$227,514,205	Isak Dinesen	
48	Ford v Ferrari	2019	$225,508,210	Carroll Shelby and Ken Miles	
49	The Social Network	2010	$224,927,749	Mark Zuckerberg, Eduardo Saverin, Narendra	
50	Napoleon	2023	$221,394,838	Napoleon	

== Biggest biopic openings ==
The following is a list of biographical films with worldwide openings over $1 million.

No.	Film	Year	Opening	Subject(s)	Ref
1	Michael	2026	$218,800,000	Michael Jackson	
2	Hi, Mom	2021	$195,000,000	Jia Ling and Li Huanying	
3	Oppenheimer	2023	$180,400,000	J. Robert Oppenheimer	
4	Dying to Survive	2018	$152,163,428	Lu Yong	
5	Once Upon a Time in the Middle East	2026	$148,000,000	Chen Xianzhong, Liu Lei, Shuai Xuejun	
6	Bohemian Rhapsody	2018	$141,700,000	Freddie Mercury and Queen	
7	300: Rise of an Empire	2014	$132,800,000	Xerxes I, Darius the Great, Artemisia I of Caria	
8	The Eight Hundred	2020	$116,000,000	Xie Jinyuan	
9	The Captain	2019	$102,353,091	Captain Liu Chuanjian	
10	American Sniper	2014	$92,693,844	Chris Kyle	
11	The Conjuring 2	2016	$90,400,000	Ed and Lorraine Warren	
12	The Passion of the Christ	2004	$83,848,082	Jesus	
13	Napoleon	2023	$78,800,000	Napoleon	
14	Annabelle Comes Home	2019	$76,200,000	Ed and Lorraine Warren	
15	300	2006	$70,885,301	Leonidas I and Xerxes I	
16	RRR	2022	$63,200,000	Komaram Bheem and Alluri Sitarama Raju	
17	Straight Outta Compton	2015	$60,200,180	N.W.A, Ice Cube, Dr. Dre, Eazy-E	
18	The Conjuring: The Devil Made Me Do It	2021	$57,100,000	Ed and Lorraine Warren	
19	The Conjuring	2013	$43,737,425	Ed and Lorraine Warren	
20	The Wolf of Wall Street	2013	$42,967,799	Jordan Belfort	
21	The Revenant	2015	$41,383,741	Hugh Glass	
22	Once Upon a Time...in Hollywood	2019	$41,082,018	Sharon Tate, Charles Manson, Bruce Lee	
23	Pocahontas	1995	$34,484,978	Pocahontas	
24	The Last Samurai	2003	$32,626,486	Saigō Takamori and Emperor Meiji	
25	Dangal	2016	$31,200,000	Mahavir Singh Phogat and Phogat sisters	
26	Catch Me If You Can	2002	$30,053,627	Frank Abagnale	
27	Apollo 13	1995	$25,353,380	Jim Lovell, Jack Swigert, Fred Haise, Mattingly	
28	The Social Network	2010	$22,445,653	Mark Zuckerberg and Eduardo Saverin	
29	Valkyrie	2008	$21,027,007	Colonel Claus von Stauffenberg	
30	A Beautiful Mind	2001	$16,565,820	John Forbes Nash	
31	The Intouchables	2011	$14,725,888	Philippe Pozzo di Borgo and Abdel Sellou	
32	The 13th Warrior	1999	$10,267,756	Ahmad ibn Fadlan	
33	The Greatest Showman	2017	$10,068,359	P. T. Barnum	
34	Dragon: The Bruce Lee Story	1993	$10,019,970	Bruce Lee and Linda Lee Cadwell	
35	Green Book	2018	$7,860,501	Don Shirley and Tony Lip	
36	Young Guns	1988	$7,011,393	Billy the Kid and José Chávez y Chávez	
37	The Theory of Everything	2014	$6,400,000	Stephen Hawking and Jane Wilde Hawking	
38	The King's Speech	2010	$5,479,078	George VI	
39	Schindler's List	1993	$4,637,480	Oskar Schindler	
40	Jodhaa Akbar	2008	$3,000,000	Akbar the Great and Mariam-uz-Zamani	
41	Mangal Pandey: The Rising	2005	$2,000,000	Mangal Pandey and Bahadur Shah Zafar	
42	The Greatest	1977	$1,361,800	Muhammad Ali	
43	Silkwood	1983	$1,218,322	Karen Silkwood	
44	Company	2002	$1,000,000	Dawood Ibrahim and Chhota Rajan	

== Timeline of gross records ==
=== Highest-grossing films ===
Year	Film	Gross	Subject(s)	Ref
1922	Nero	$522,000	Nero	
1923	The Ten Commandments	$8,300,000	Moses and Ramesses II	
1925	Ben-Hur: A Tale of the Christ	$10,700,000	Jesus, Mary, Balthazar	
1943	The Outlaw	$20,000,000	Billy the Kid, Pat Garrett, Doc Holliday	
1954	The Egyptian	$20,000,000	Horemheb, Baketaten, Akhenaten	
1956	The Ten Commandments	$122,700,000	Moses and Ramesses II	
1959	Ben-Hur	$146,900,000	Jesus, Joseph, Balthazar	
1965	The Sound of Music	$286,213,233	Trapp Family	
1993	Schindler's List	$322,161,245	Oskar Schindler	
1995	Pocahontas	$347,100,000	Pocahontas	
1995	Apollo 13	$355,237,933	Jim Lovell, Jack Swigert, Fred Haise, Ken Mattingly	
2003	The Last Samurai	$456,810,575	Saigō Takamori and Emperor Meiji	
2004	The Passion of the Christ	$612,054,506	Jesus	
2018	Bohemian Rhapsody	$911,027,169	Freddie Mercury and Queen	
2023	Oppenheimer	$976,779,216	J. Robert Oppenheimer	
2026	Michael †	$1,028,597,887	Michael Jackson	

=== Biggest openings ===
Year	Film	Opening	Subject(s)	Ref
1943	The Outlaw	$30,000	Billy the Kid, Pat Garrett, Doc Holliday	
1977	The Greatest	$1,361,800	Muhammad Ali	
1988	Young Guns	$7,011,393	Billy the Kid and José Chávez y Chávez	
1993	Dragon: The Bruce Lee Story	$10,019,970	Bruce Lee and Linda Lee Cadwell	
1995	Apollo 13	$25,353,380	Jim Lovell, Jack Swigert, Fred Haise, Ken Mattingly	
1995	Pocahontas	$34,484,978	Pocahontas	
2004	The Passion of the Christ	$83,848,082	Jesus	
2014	American Sniper	$92,693,844	Chris Kyle	
2014	300: Rise of an Empire	$132,800,000	Xerxes I, Darius the Great, Artemisia I of Caria	
2018	Bohemian Rhapsody	$141,700,000	Freddie Mercury and Queen	
2018	Dying to Survive	$152,163,428	Lu Yong	
2021	Hi, Mom	$195,000,000	Jia Ling and Li Huanying	
2026	Michael	$218,800,000	Michael Jackson	

== Box office ticket sales ==
The following is a list of biographical films that sold more than 40 million tickets at the worldwide box office.

† Background shading indicates films playing in the week commencing 6 November 2026 in theaters around the world.

Film	Year	Tickets (est.)	Subject(s)	Ref
From Slave to General	1979	470,000,000	Luo Binghui and People's Liberation Army	
The Xi'an Incident	1981	450,000,000	Zhang Xueliang, Zhou Enlai, Chiang Kai-shek	
Ji Hongchang	1979	380,000,000	Ji Hongchang	
The Sound of Music	1965	283,300,000	Trapp Family	
The Ten Commandments	1956	262,000,000	Moses and Ramesses II	
Du Shiniang	1981	260,000,000	Du Shiniang	
Bohemian Rhapsody	2018	176,500,000	Freddie Mercury and Queen	
Ben-Hur	1959	168,893,565	Jesus, Joseph, Balthazar	(Note: Ben-Hur: United States and Canada – 104,996,416; Germany, Italy, Netherlands, United Kingdom – 44,509,000; France – 13,857,261; Spain – 4,653,194; South Korea – 873,163; European re-releases (1996–2021) – 4,531)
Mughal-e-Azam (The Great Mughal)	1960	150,000,000	Jahangir, Anarkali, Akbar the Great	
Dangal	2016	140,000,000	Mahavir Singh Phogat and Phogat sisters	
Michael †	2026	137,200,000	Michael Jackson	(Note: Michael admissions: United States – 32,732,000; Brazil, China, France, Germany, Italy, Spain – 23,502,526; Mexico – 6,950,000; United Kingdom – 6,600,000; South Korea – 1,624,177; Argentina – 1,009,907; United Arab Emirates – 578,316; Hungary – 399,286; Czech Republic – 280,961; Greece – 216,205; Bulgaria – 169,006; Finland – 162,670; Slovakia – 149,069)
Spartacus	1960	124,783,920	Spartacus and Crassus	
Hi, Mom	2021	121,000,000	Jia Ling and Li Huanying	
Cleopatra	1963	116,470,333	Cleopatra	(Note: Cleopatra: United States and Canada – 67,183,500; Soviet Union – 32.9 million; France, Germany, Italy – 16,376,099; South Korea – 9,192; United Kingdom, Spain, Latvia (2011–2017) – 1,542)
The Revenant	2015	106,800,000	Hugh Glass	
Oppenheimer	2023	102,700,000	J. Robert Oppenheimer	
Zhou Enlai	1991	100,000,000	Zhou Enlai and Deng Yingchao	
Dying to Survive	2018	89,042,600	Lu Yong	
The Passion of the Christ	2004	85,612,215	Jesus	
Lawrence of Arabia	1962	85,542,933	T. E. Lawrence, Faisal I, Auda Abu Tayi	(Note: Lawrence of Arabia admissions: United States – 58,213,000; United Kingdom, Spain, Portugal – 10,375,327; Italy and France – 13,312,198; Germany – 3,552,000; South Korea (Seoul City) – 90,408)
The Greatest Showman	2017	85,100,000	P. T. Barnum	
Butch Cassidy and the Sundance Kid	1969	84,863,424	Butch Cassidy and Sundance Kid	
War and Peace	1956	82,195,201	Mikhail Kutuzov and Napoleon	(Note: War and Peace (1956 film) § Box office)
The Eight Hundred	2020	80,919,900	Xie Jinyuan	
The Captain	2019	77,923,355	Captain Liu Chuanjian	(Note: The Captain: China – 77,827,000; United States – 77,137; United Kingdom and Ireland – 19,218)
Once Upon a Time in the Middle East †	2026	66,728,500	Chen Xianzhong, Liu Lei, Shuai Xuejun	
Ben-Hur: A Tale of the Christ	1925	64,500,000	Jesus, Mary, Balthazar	
The Conjuring 2	2016	64,200,000	Ed and Lorraine Warren	
El Cid	1961	63,362,397	El Cid and Yusuf ibn Tashfin	(Note: El Cid: United States and Canada – 46,300,000; Italy – 11,200,000; France and Germany – 5,726,723; Seoul City (South Korea) – 135,576; Spain (1999 and 2022) – 98)
Fist of Fury	1972	59,000,000	Chin Woo and Huo Yuanjia	
War and Peace: Part I	1965	58,300,000	Mikhail Kutuzov and Napoleon	
Never Say Never	2023	54,251,200	En Bo, Su Mudaerji, Enbo Fight Club	
The Last Samurai	2003	54,175,104	Saigō Takamori and Emperor Meiji	(Note: The Last Samurai admissions: United States, Japan, Brazil – 33,243,101; France – 2,213,315; Other European countries – 17,455,488; South Korea – 1,263,200)
300	2006	52,317,727	Leonidas I and Xerxes I	
Pocahontas	1995	52,057,720	Pocahontas	(Note: Pocahontas: United Kingdom – 2,900,000; South Korea – 280,683; Other territories – 48,877,037)
Bonnie and Clyde	1967	58,345,531	Bonnie and Clyde	
Green Book	2018	50,300,000	Don Shirley and Tony Lip	
The Intouchables	2011	50,200,000	Philippe Pozzo di Borgo and Abdel Sellou	
Apollo 13	1995	50,179,389	Jim Lovell, Swigert, Haise, Mattingly	
RRR	2022	50,000,000	Komaram Bheem and Alluri Sitarama Raju	
American Sniper	2014	49,500,000	Chris Kyle	
The Outlaw	1943	48,300,000	Billy the Kid, Pat Garrett, Doc Holliday	
Sully	2016	48,300,000	Sully Sullenberger	
A Beautiful Mind	2001	47,326,213	John Forbes Nash	
Out of Africa	1985	46,319,692	Isak Dinesen	
Hidden Figures	2016	46,200,000	Katherine Johnson and Dorothy Vaughan	
Catch Me If You Can	2002	46,031,903	Frank Abagnale	
Schindler's List	1993	43,643,699	Oskar Schindler	
The King's Speech	2010	43,624,849	George VI	
Funny Girl	1968	43,467,033	Fanny Brice and Nicky Arnstein	
Papillon	1973	43,321,023	Henri Charrière	
The Conjuring: Last Rites	2025	42,800,000	Ed and Lorraine Warren	
The Young Guard	1948	42,400,000	Oleg Koshevoy and Lyubov Shevtsova	
Shakespeare in Love	1998	41,032,454	William Shakespeare	

== Highest-grossing biopics by year ==
† Background shading indicates films playing in the week commencing 6 November 2026 in theaters around the world.

Year	Film	Box office (est.)		Subject(s)	Ref
Year	Film	Gross	Tickets	Subject(s)	Ref
1922	Nero	$522,000	2,000,000	Nero	
1923	The Ten Commandments	$8,300,000	34,739,917	Moses and Ramesses II	
1924	Beau Brummel	$495,000	2,000,000	Beau Brummell	
1925	Ben-Hur: A Tale of the Christ	$10,700,000	64,500,000	Jesus, Mary, Balthazar	
1941	Billy the Kid	$6,300,000	25,000,000	Billy the Kid	
1943	The Outlaw	$20,000,000	48,300,000	Billy the Kid and Pat Garrett	
1948	The Young Guard	$12,000,000	42,400,000	Oleg Koshevoy	(Note: See Film industry § Average ticket price.)
1950	Samadhi	$3,000,000	10,000,000	Subhas Chandra Bose	
1951	The Great Caruso	$12,900,000	32,947,223	Enrico Caruso	
1953	Anarkali	$5,000,000	25,000,000	Jahangir, Anarkali, Akbar	
1954	The Egyptian	$20,000,000	33,000,000	Horemheb and Baketaten	
1956	The Ten Commandments	$122,700,000	262,000,000	Moses and Ramesses II	
1957	Gunfight at the O.K. Corral	$11,750,000	27,983,361	Wyatt Earp and Doc Holliday	
1958	The Vikings	$15,000,000	16,529,540	Ragnar Lodbrok and Ecgberht I	
1959	Ben-Hur	$146,900,000	168,893,565	Jesus, Joseph, Balthazar	
1960	Spartacus	$59,999,883	124,783,920	Spartacus and Crassus	
1960	Mughal-e-Azam	$24,000,000	150,000,000	Jahangir, Anarkali, Akbar	
1961	El Cid	$26,637,553	63,362,397	El Cid and Yusuf ibn Tashfin	
1962	Lawrence of Arabia	$69,995,047	85,542,933	T. E. Lawrence and Faisal I	
1963	Cleopatra	$76,000,000	116,470,333	Cleopatra	
1964	The Unsinkable Molly Brown	$11,070,559	11,913,000	Molly Brown	
1965	The Sound of Music	$286,213,233	283,300,000	Trapp Family	
1966	War and Peace: Part II	$17,000,000	36,200,000	Mikhail Kutuzov and Napoleon	(Note: War and Peace (film series) § Reception)
1967	Bonnie and Clyde	$70,000,000	58,345,531	Bonnie and Clyde	
1968	Funny Girl	$58,707,416	43,467,033	Fanny Brice and Nicky Arnstein	
1969	Butch Cassidy and the Sundance Kid	$102,315,881	84,863,424	Butch Cassidy and Sundance Kid	
1970	Chisum	$18,200,000	14,696,732	John Chisum, Lawrence Murphy	
1971	The Devils	$11,000,000	5,480,149	Jeanne des Anges	
1972	Fist of Fury	$100,000,000	59,000,000	Chin Woo and Huo Yuanjia	
1973	Papillon	$53,267,000	43,321,023	Henri Charrière	
1974	The Life and Times of Grizzly Adams	$65,000,000	25,369,000	Grizzly Adams	
1975	Funny Lady	$40,055,897	22,900,000	Fanny Brice and Billy Rose	
1975	Deewar	$9,000,000	31,000,000	Haji Mastan	
1976	All the President's Men	$70,603,656	34,057,742	Carl Bernstein, Bob Woodward	
1977	The Greatest	$10,300,000	3,782,000	Muhammad Ali	
1978	Drunken Master	$16,483,650	?	Wong Fei-hung and Beggar So	(Note: Drunken Master § Box office)
1979	From Slave to General	$61,000,000	470,000,000	Luo Binghui	
1980	Coal Miner's Daughter	$67,182,787	25,000,000	Loretta Lynn	
1981	The Xi'an Incident	$54,000,000	450,000,000	Zhang Xueliang and Zhou Enlai	
1982	Gandhi	$127,767,889	26,838,889	Gandhi and Muhammad Jinnah	(Note: Gandhi admissions: United Kingdom and United States – 18,800,000; Denmark, France, Germany, Netherlands, Portugal, Spain, Sweden – 7,506,687; Italy – 532,000; Finland, Ireland, Switzerland (since 1996) – 202)
1983	Silkwood	$35,616,970	12,080,367	Karen Silkwood	
1984	Amadeus	$90,000,000	23,970,265	Amadeus Mozart, Antonio Salieri	
1985	Out of Africa	$227,514,205	46,319,692	Isak Dinesen	
1986	Heartburn	$52,600,000	8,100,488	Nora Ephron and Carl Bernstein	
1987	La Bamba	$54,218,591	17,646,197	Ritchie Valens	
1988	The Silk Road (Dun-Huang)	$74,100,000	7,300,000	Li Yuanhao	(Note: $74,000,000 in Japan. $123,959 in the United States.) (Note: See List of highest-grossing Japanese films § Highest-grossing Japanese films by year.)
1988	Young Guns	$56,000,000	11,213,883	José Chávez y Chávez	
1989	Born on the Fourth of July	$161,001,698	21,004,639	Ron Kovic	
1990	Heaven and Earth	$64,000,000	7,800,000	Uesugi Kenshin, Takeda Shingen	
1990	Young Guns II	$59,000,000	10,944,076	José Chávez y Chávez	
1991	JFK	$205,405,498	25,817,007	Jim Garrison, John F. Kennedy	
1991	Zhou Enlai	$49,000,000	100,000,000	Zhou Enlai and Deng Yingchao	
1992	Malcolm X	$73,102,963	13,165,142	Malcolm X	(Note: Malcolm X: United States, France, Spain – 12,339,182; United Kingdom – 797,481; Germany – 127,306; South Korea – 28,159; Switzerland (since 2022) – 320)
1993	Schindler's List	$322,161,245	43,643,699	Oskar Schindler	
1994	Drunken Master II	$34,300,528	?	Wong Fei-hung	(Note: Drunken Master II § Box office)
1995	Apollo 13	$355,237,933	50,179,389	Lovell, Swigert, Haise, Mattingly	
1995	Pocahontas	$347,100,000	52,057,720	Pocahontas	
1996	Shine	$35,999,121	19,852,892	David Helfgott	
1997	Border	$18,000,000	37,083,000	Kuldip Singh Chandpuri	
1998	Shakespeare in Love	$289,317,794	41,032,454	William Shakespeare	
1999	The 13th Warrior	$61,698,899	11,016,902	Ahmad ibn Fadlan	(Note: The 13th Warrior admissions: United States – 6,436,791; France and Germany – 1,944,938; Other European countries – 2,635,173)
2000	Erin Brockovich	$257,851,763	35,833,977	Erin Brockovich	
2001	A Beautiful Mind	$316,791,257	47,326,213	John Forbes Nash	
2002	Catch Me If You Can	$352,114,312	46,031,903	Frank Abagnale	
2003	The Last Samurai	$456,810,575	54,175,104	Saigō Takamori, Emperor Meiji	
2004	The Passion of the Christ	$612,054,506	85,612,215	Jesus	
2005	Kingdom of Heaven	$218,366,336	24,640,138	Balian of Ibelin and Saladin	(Note: Kingdom of Heaven admissions: United States – 7,428,000; France, Germany, Italy – 4,700,955; Other European countries – 7,678,851; Brazil – 2,323,009; South Korea – 1,509,323; Japan – 1,000,000)
2006	300	$456,082,343	52,317,727	Leonidas I and Xerxes I	
2007	American Gangster	$269,755,430	38,751,925	Frank Lucas	(Note: American Gangster admissions: United States – 19,164,000; Germany – 8,311,347; Brazil and Russia – 768,288; Other European countries – 9,244,666; Japan – 860,000; South Korea – 403,624)
2008	Valkyrie	$201,545,517	21,680,370	Colonel Claus von Stauffenberg	
2009	The Blind Side	$309,231,694	38,649,029	Michael Oher	(Note: The Blind Side: United States and Brazil – 35,853,855; Europe – 2,435,275; South Korea – 359,899)
2010	The King's Speech	$414,245,125	43,624,849	George VI	
2011	The Intouchables	$426,590,315	50,200,000	Philippe di Borgo, Abdel Sellou	
2012	Lincoln	$275,293,450	32,400,000	Abraham Lincoln	
2013	The Wolf of Wall Street	$407,039,432	38,100,000	Jordan Belfort	
2014	American Sniper	$547,659,020	49,500,000	Chris Kyle	
2015	The Revenant	$532,950,503	106,800,000	Hugh Glass	
2016	Dangal	$340,000,000	140,000,000	Mahavir Phogat, Phogat sisters	
2017	The Greatest Showman	$471,812,742	85,100,000	P. T. Barnum	
2018	Bohemian Rhapsody	$911,027,169	176,500,000	Freddie Mercury and Queen	
2019	The Captain	$417,282,021	77,923,355	Captain Liu Chuanjian	
2020	The Eight Hundred	$461,421,559	80,919,900	Xie Jinyuan	
2021	Hi, Mom	$841,674,419	121,000,000	Jia Ling and Li Huanying	
2022	Elvis	$288,670,284	31,800,000	Elvis Presley	
2022	RRR	$173,000,000	50,000,000	Komaram Bheem and Alluri Raju	
2023	Oppenheimer	$976,779,216	102,700,000	J. Robert Oppenheimer	
2024	Bob Marley: One Love	$180,971,146	17,200,000	Bob Marley	
2025	The Conjuring: Last Rites	$499,256,445	42,800,000	Ed and Lorraine Warren	
2026	Michael †	$1,028,597,887	137,200,000	Michael Jackson	

== Highest-grossing biopic series ==
The following is a list of biographical films series that gross over $1 million.

Highest-grossing animated franchises and film series^{[§]}(The films in each franchise can be viewed by selecting "show")

Rank	Series	Total gross	No. of films	Average of films	Highest-grossing film

1	The Conjuring Universe	$2,903,037,098	11	$263,912,463	The Conjuring: Last Rites ($499,156,445)
/ The Conjuring series / $1,348,814,363 / 4 / $337,203,591 / The Conjuring: Last Rites ($499,156,445); 1 / The Conjuring: Last Rites (2025) / $499,156,445; 2 / The Conjuring 2 (2016) / $322,811,702; 3 / The Conjuring (2013) / $320,415,166; 4 / The Conjuring: The Devil Made Me Do It (2021) / $206,431,050
/ Annabelle series / $795,434,744 / 3 / $265,144,915 / Creation ($306,592,201); 1 / Annabelle: Creation (2017) / $306,592,201; 2 / Annabelle (2014) / $257,589,952; 3 / Annabelle Comes Home (2019) / $231,252,591
/ The Nun series / $635,549,870 / 2 / $317,774,935 / The Nun ($366,082,797); 1 / The Nun (2018) / $366,082,797; 2 / The Nun II (2023) / $269,467,073
The Curse of La Llorona (2019) / $123,233,739
Wolves at the Door (2016) / $4,382

2	300	$793,662,394	2	$396,831,197	300 ($456,082,343)
1	300 (2008)	$456,082,343			
2	Rise of an Empire (2014)	$337,580,051			

3
Ip Man
$443,164,998
5
$88,633,000
Ip Man 4: The Finale ($193,267,400)

	Main series	$422,178,906	4	$105,544,727	Ip Man 4: The Finale ($193,267,400)
1	Ip Man 4: The Finale (2019)	$193,267,400			
2	Ip Man 3 (2015)	$157,300,954			
3	Ip Man 2: Legend of the Grandmaster (2010)	$49,721,954			
4	Ip Man (2008)	$21,888,598			

Master Z: Ip Man Legacy (2018)	$21,635,601

4	Young Guns	$115,000,000	2	$57,500,000	Young Guns II ($59,000,000)
1	Young Guns II (1990)	$59,000,000			
2	Young Guns (1988)	$56,000,000			

5	War and Peace	$64,000,000	4	$16,000,000	Part I ($28,000,000)
1	Part I (1965)	$28,000,000			
2	Part II (1966)	$17,000,000			
3	Part III (1967)	$10,000,000			
4	Part IV (1967)	$9,000,000			

6	Drunken Master	$51,784,178	3	$17,261,393	Drunken Master II ($34,300,528)
1	Drunken Master (1978)	$34,300,528			
2	Drunken Master II (1994)	$16,483,650			
3	Drunken Master III (1994)	$1,000,000			

== See also ==
- Biographical film
- List of biographical films
- List of highest-grossing films
- Lists of highest-grossing films
