= Paper Bride =

Video game series

Paper Bride (Chinese: 纸嫁衣; pinyin: zhǐjiàyī; lit. 'Paper Wedding Dress') is a Chinese horror puzzle video game series developed by HeartBeat Plus (Chinese: 纸嫁衣工作室; pinyin: zhǐjiàyīgōngzuòshì; lit. 'Paper Wedding Dress Studio'). The first game in the Paper Bride series was released on January 22, 2021, for mobile devices (iOS and Android). It was later released on Steam for PC on December 3, 2021. Since then, this series has been expanded into multiple sequels and spin-offs.

The Paper Bride is an eighth standalone story-driven game, including the spin-off You Shall Not Betray. This series backdrop is set in traditional Chinese folklore. This game series presents an independent chapter in each installment. Each title shares the same themes of ritual traditions, supernatural disturbances, and unresolved relationships, which are connected to death and marriage through characters such as Ning Zifu, Nie Moqi, and Tao Mengyan. Which Nie Moli serves as a key antagonist across multiple installments connected through easter eggs and overarching narratives, constructing a Chinese horror universe. The first seven games were released globally on Steam and mobile platforms, while the complete collection is available on the Chinese server app platforms.

The Paper Bride is presented through a point-and-click interface combined with puzzle-solving. Players must explore and solve puzzles to uncover the truth behind the events through environmental clues, symbolic objects, and ritual elements, including spirit offerings, ancestral rites, Chinese opera symbolism, and wedding traditions. The combination of story and puzzle design with a traditional Chinese folklore theme makes Paper Bride a good example of a Chinese horror game that blends folklore-based storytelling with interactive puzzle mechanics.

== Story overview ==
The Paper Bride series focuses on supernatural mysteries connected to traditional Chinese beliefs, marriage rituals, death, and the spirit world (Wu, 2024).

== Gameplay ==
Gameplay in the Paper Bride series is mainly in a point-and-click adventure combined with puzzle-solving mechanics. Players need to explore various environments by interacting with objects and collecting clues to help them progress through the story. The gameplay structure is typically divided into chapters, each chapter introducing new locations, puzzles, and story developments connected to the mystery.

Most of the puzzles are related to cultural symbols and ritual practices found in traditional Chinese culture. Players frequently encounter items such as paper offerings, incense burners, ceremonial objects, and decorative elements associated with wedding or funeral rituals. In order to solve puzzles the game requires careful observation of the environment and interpreting symbolic clues (Wu, 2024). Instead of emphasizing combat, the series emphasizes exploration, atmosphere, and story discovery as players gradually uncover the truth behind the supernatural events. Critics have noted that while the puzzles provide a significant challenge, they help players immerse themselves in the game lore.

== Games ==
In 2021, the Paper Bride series expanded into eight sequels that have been published over the years. While keeping and maintaining the gameplay mechanics and themes of the series, each installment presents a new storyline. Initially, the games were created for iOS and Android mobile devices. Later, several games were also made available on PC for Steam and other digital platforms.

The Paper Bride stories revolve around Chinese folklore and cultural traditions, particularly the concept of ghost marriage, while exploring themes of love, fate, and sacrifice. Each chapter reinterprets elements from classical Chinese literature, including A Chinese Ghost Story (倩女幽魂), Butterfly Lovers (梁祝), Jiao Hong Ji (娇红记), Romance of the Western Chamber (西厢记), The Peony Pavilion (牡丹亭), and Du Shiniang Angrily Sinks a Treasure Chest (杜十娘怒沉百宝箱).

== Other media ==
The Paper Bride series is also notable for its music, with songs and soundtracks playing an important role in expressing the game's emotional depth and themes. Its music has achieved significant popularity, contributing to the overall success of the series. Among them, the most well-known track is Unresolved Love (鸳鸯债), which reflects the injustice of fate faced by lovers and their enduring desire to protect and remain devoted to one another.

The song is widely appreciated not only by players but also by general audiences. By 2026, it had gathered over 15.2 million views on the Chinese video platform Bilibili, highlighting both its popularity and the high production quality of the game's soundtrack.

== Reception and legacy ==
The Paper Bride series received significant critical acclaim for its successful integration of traditional Chinese culture into the modern puzzle-horror game. Scholars identified this series as an example of hybrid folklore by using cultural elements, ritual, traditional artifacts and wedding customs to create immersive gameplay and story. The series is noted for its potential to reflect the ideological conflicts between traditional customs and contemporary values, through its portrayal of idealized love amidst supernatural tragedies (Wu, 2024).

In Thailand, the series gained popularity following its official Thai localization. Critics from local gaming media, such as GamingDose, have praised the game for its suspenseful atmosphere and well-executed jump scares that effectively elevate the horror experience (GamingDose, 2021). Furthermore, the series is commended for its challenging puzzles that, despite their difficulty, encourage players to deeply engage with the game's cultural lore and environmental storytelling (GamingDose, 2021, para. 3). The success of the Paper Bride series in Thailand has created a growing interest in Chinese-style horror games within the local gaming community, making this series a benchmark for the genre.
