= The Upside =

2017 film by Neil Burger

- Theatrical release poster
- Directed by: Neil Burger
- Screenplay by: Jon Hartmere
- Based on: The Intouchables by Éric Toledano; Olivier Nakache
- Produced by: Todd Black; Jason Blumenthal; Steve Tisch
- Starring: Kevin Hart; Bryan Cranston; Nicole Kidman; Golshifteh Farahani
- Cinematography: Stuart Dryburgh
- Edited by: Naomi Geraghty
- Music by: Rob Simonsen
- Production company: Escape Artists
- Distributed by: STXfilms; Lantern Entertainment (United States, Canada and China); Amazon Studios (International)
- Release dates: September 8, 2017 (TIFF); January 11, 2019 (United States)
- Running time: 126 minutes
- Country: United States
- Language: English
- Budget: $37.5 million
- Box office: $125.9 million

The Upside is a 2017 American comedy drama film directed by Neil Burger, written by Jon Hartmere. It is a remake of the French 2011 film The Intouchables, which was itself inspired by the lives of Abdel Sellou and Philippe Pozzo di Borgo. The film follows a paralyzed billionaire (Bryan Cranston) who strikes up an unlikely friendship with a recently paroled convict (Kevin Hart) whom he hires to take care of him. Nicole Kidman, Golshifteh Farahani, and Julianna Margulies also star. It is the third remake of The Intouchables after the Indian film Oopiri and the Argentinian film Inseparables (both in 2016).

An English-language remake of The Intouchables was first announced in July 2011. Hart signed on to star in October 2014, followed by Cranston in March 2016, and Burger to direct that August. Filming began in Philadelphia in January 2017.

The film premiered at the 2017 Toronto International Film Festival. Originally to be distributed by The Weinstein Company in March 2018, the film was shelved and sold off following the Harvey Weinstein sexual abuse allegations. It was eventually bought by STX Entertainment and Lantern Entertainment (the successor of TWC), which then released it in the United States on January 11, 2019, becoming Lantern's first release. The Upside grossed $122 million worldwide and received mixed reviews from critics, who praised Hart and Cranston's chemistry and performances but criticized the plot for being "predictable and cliché".

== Plot ==
Speeding through New York City in a Ferrari, Dell Scott and quadriplegic Philip Lacasse are pulled over by the NYPD. Dell convinces the officers that he is rushing Philip to the emergency room; Philip grudgingly plays along, and the two are escorted to the hospital.

Six months earlier, Dell meets with his parole officer and needs signatures to prove he is seeking a job or he will be held in violation of his parole. He enters a building seeking a job in the penthouse home of Philip, a wealthy quadriplegic, who has lost the will to live. Philip, with his assistant Yvonne Pendleton, is interviewing candidates for the position of his "life auxiliary" caregiver. Dell barges in and demands a signature for his parole officer. Philip offers him the job, thinking his incompetent nature will result in his death, over Yvonne's objections, but Dell declines.

Dell visits his ex-wife Latrice and son Anthony at their dilapidated apartment, but neither is willing to accept Dell back into their lives. He gives Anthony a book he stole from Philip's library. Dell then accepts Philip's offer; Yvonne stipulates that he must show he can handle his responsibilities, and "three strikes" will get him immediately fired. Dell, having no training, is initially daunted, despite guidance from Philip's physical therapist Maggie, and quickly earns two strikes. Dell leaves to give his first paycheck to Latrice and asks for the stolen book back, but she refuses. Upon his return, Yvonne gives him a third strike for his unexplained absence, but Philip covers for him.

When Philip explains his strict Do Not Resuscitate order, Dell realizes he has lost the will to live, but when he finds Philip struggling to breathe, refuses to allow him to die. Dell takes Philip out into the city, where they share a joint to ease Philip's neurogenic pain. Dell and Philip begin to bond, and Philip tells Dell that he was paralyzed in a paragliding accident, and reveals the pain of losing his wife. Dell adjusts to caring for Philip, even modifying his wheelchair, and is introduced to opera and modern art; he creates his own painting, which Philip displays in the penthouse.

Dell suspects that Yvonne has feelings for Philip, but she informs him that Philip is in an epistolary relationship with a woman named Lily; they have never met or even spoken, corresponding only through letters. With Dell's encouragement, Philip leaves Lily a voicemail.

Philip joins Dell as he takes Anthony out for the day. Everything goes well until Dell asks Anthony for the book back; disappointed in his father, Anthony returns the book and leaves. Dell and Philip return home to a surprise birthday party Yvonne has organized with Philip's neighbors against his wishes. He argues with Dell, who then smashes various items around the room at his bidding as a means of catharsis. Dell and Philip share another joint, and then socialize at the party. Carter, a neighbor Philip dislikes, approaches him about Dell's criminal record, but Philip ignores him. Lily calls Philip, and they agree to have dinner.

At the restaurant, Philip reveals Carter bought Dell's painting for $50,000, which he gives him enough money to start his own business. When Lily arrives, she allows Dell to leave, having researched Philip's condition in advance, but gradually becomes agitated and overwhelmed. Hurt, Philip abruptly ends the date and returns home, where he lashes out and fires Dell.

Time passes; Dell buys Latrice and Anthony a new home, and starts a business building motorized wheelchairs. Maggie asks Dell to help Philip, who has sunken into depression and driven Yvonne away. Dell takes Philip for a drive, leading up to the encounter with the police from the beginning of the film. They flee the hospital and repair their friendship. Dell surprises Philip with a paragliding trip, and is surprised himself when he is forced to join. Dell then brings Philip to meet Yvonne, leaving the two of them to reunite as he returns home to Latrice and Anthony.

== Cast ==
- Kevin Hart as Dell Scott
- Bryan Cranston as Philip Lacasse
- Nicole Kidman as Yvonne Pendleton, Philip's PA
- Golshifteh Farahani as Maggie, Philip's physical therapist
- Aja Naomi King as Latrice, Dell's ex-wife
- Tate Donovan as Carter, Philip's neighbor
- Jahi Di'Allo Winston as Anthony Scott, Dell's son
- Genevieve Angelson as Jenny Lacasse, Philip's late wife
- Suzanne Savoy as Charlotte, Philip's cook
- Julianna Margulies as Lily Foley, Philip's epistolary love interest

== Production ==
=== Development ===
In July 2011, in addition to buying distribution rights in English-speaking countries, Scandinavian countries and China, The Weinstein Company acquired the rights to remake The Intouchables in English. In June 2012, Paul Feig was slated to direct and write the script, with Chris Rock, Jamie Foxx and Idris Elba eyed for the role of Dell, Colin Firth in talks for Philip, and Jessica Chastain and Michelle Williams considered for a female lead.

By March 2013, Feig dropped out of directing, with Tom Shadyac in talks to replace him, and Chris Tucker was in consideration for Dell. In October 2014, Kevin Hart was cast as Dell, with Firth still attached as Philip.

In March 2016, it was announced that Bryan Cranston would play Philip, replacing Firth. Simon Curtis was to direct Cranston and Hart from a screenplay written by Feig. By August 2016, Curtis dropped out of directing. Neil Burger was announced as his replacement. A script by Jon Hartmere was used rather than Feig's work.

In January 2017, Nicole Kidman and Genevieve Angelson joined the cast of the film, and in February 2017, Aja Naomi King and Julianna Margulies were cast as well.

On August 2, 2017, the film's title was changed to The Upside.

=== Filming ===
Principal photography began on January 27, 2017, in Philadelphia. An official photo was released on January 30, 2017, of Hart's character via his Instagram account. The film initially received an R rating from the MPAA, but Burger and the film's producers trimmed it to get a PG-13 rating.

== Release ==
The film had its world premiere at the Toronto International Film Festival on September 8, 2017. It was initially scheduled to be released in the United States on March 9, 2018. However, in January 2018, following the Harvey Weinstein sexual abuse allegations scandal, the film was pulled from the schedule by The Weinstein Company and moved to an unspecified 2018 date.

In August 2018, it was announced STX Entertainment would be partnering with Lantern Entertainment, the successor to TWC, to distribute the film. In February 2019, Amazon Prime Video acquired international SVOD rights to The Upside and would release the film as a Prime Original in every territory excluding the United States, Canada and China. It was released in the United States, Canada and China on January 11, 2019 and overseas on April 19, 2019. STX spent just under $30 million promoting the film, including $7 million on TV advertisements.

== Reception ==
=== Box office ===
The Upside grossed $108.3 million in the United States and Canada, and $17.6 million in the UK, the film was released alongside Replicas and A Dog's Way Home, as well as the wide expansion of On the Basis of Sex, and was initially projected to gross around $10 million from 3,080 theaters in its opening weekend. However, after making $7 million on its first day (including $1.1 million from Thursday night previews), estimates were raised to $19 million. It went on to debut to $20.4 million, becoming the first film to dethrone Aquaman from atop the box office after three weeks at the number one spot, as well as the first number one box office opening for STX Films. The film fell to second in its sophomore weekend behind newcomer Glass, grossing $15.7 million. It continued to hold well in the following two weekends, grossing $11.9 million and $8.9 million, finishing behind Glass both times.

=== Critical response ===
On review aggregator Rotten Tomatoes, the film holds an approval rating of 43%, based on 191 reviews, with an average rating of 5.30/10. The website's critical consensus reads, "Preachy, manipulative, and frustratingly clichéd, The Upside showcases Bryan Cranston and Kevin Hart's chemistry without ever taking full advantage of it." On Metacritic, which uses a weighted average, the film has a score of 46 out of 100, based on 40 critics, indicating "mixed or average reviews". Audiences polled by CinemaScore gave the film an average grade of "A" on an A+ to F scale, while PostTrak reported filmgoers gave it 4.5 out of 5 stars and a "definite recommend" of 66%.

Richard Roeper of the Chicago Sun-Times writes "Hart delivers a sincere and relatively low-key performance as Dell, but he's playing an all-too-familiar movie stereotype."

Scott Tobias of Variety, reviewing the film after its 2017 premiere, was critical of it for failing to improve upon the original or update the story, writing, "So little has been done to update or refresh The Intouchables for American culture or a new audience that The Upside has no integrity as a separate piece of work."

Peter Bradshaw of The Guardian wrote "The whole affair is misjudged and sickly sweet" and gave it one out of five stars.
