= Philippe Pozzo di Borgo =

French entrepreneur and author (1951–2023)

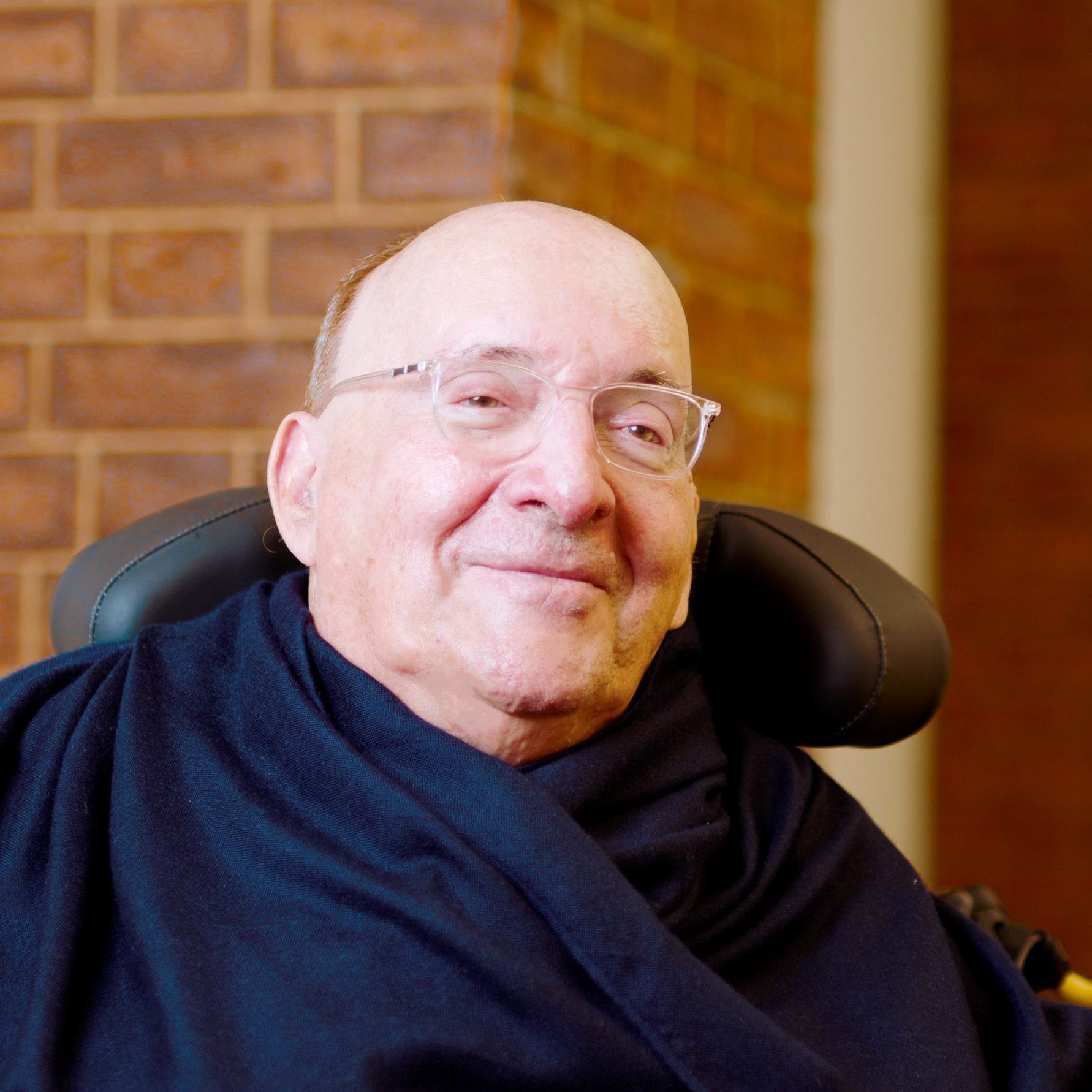
- Di Borgo in 2022
- Born: 14 February 1951; Tunis, French Tunisia
- Died: 1 June 2023 (aged 72); Marrakesh, Morocco
- Citizenship: French
- Occupation: Owner of Pommery

Philippe Pozzo di Borgo (14 February 1951 – 1 June 2023) was a French businessman who was the director of Pommery and the owner of the inherited historic Hôtel de Maisons hôtel particulier in Paris.

== Biography ==
Philippe was the second son of the French duke Pozzo di Borgo and the Marquise de Vogue. The noble family dates back to the 1500s. After completing his education, he began working in the champagne industry. Prior to his job as director of Pommery, Philippe was a manager at Moët and Chandon.

Philippe di Borgo became a quadriplegic in 1993 following a paragliding accident. Because of his disability, he attempted to commit suicide by wrapping an oxygen tube around his neck.

In July 2012, he was appointed a Knight of the Legion of Honour.

Pozzo di Borgo died on 1 June 2023, at the age of 72.

== In popular culture ==
The story of Philippe and his Algerian attendant, Abdel Sellou, was told in a 2003 documentary, A la vie, à la mort. Their story was also adapted in the biographical movies The Intouchables (2011), and the Indian, Argentine, and American re-makes, respectively, Oopiri (transl. Breath) in Telugu (2016), Thozha (transl. Friend) in Tamil, Inseparables (2016), and The Upside (2017). These movies were based on his 2001 memoir, A Second Wind.
