= Jiang Qiming =

Chinese actor

- 蔣奇明
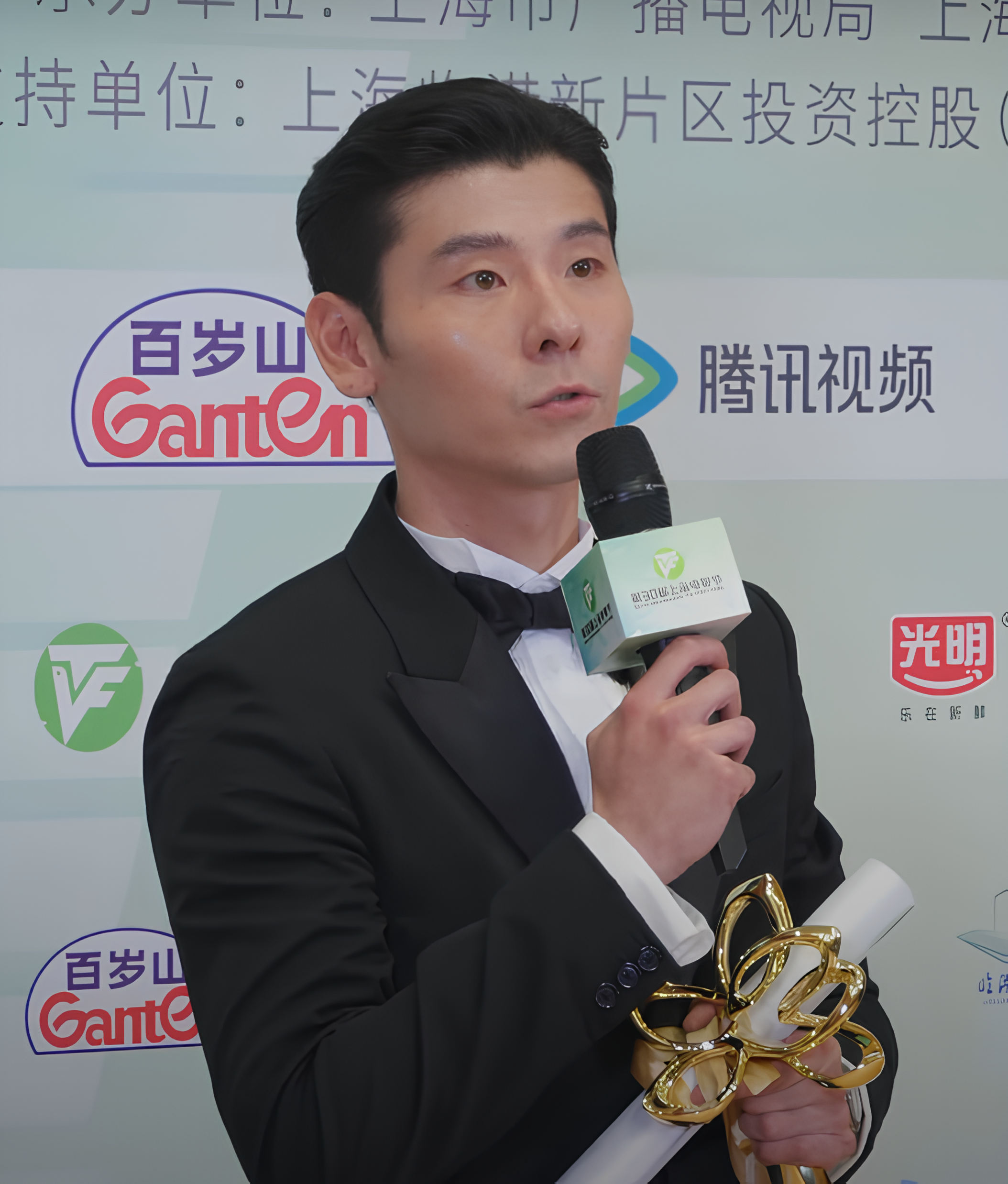
- Born: 29 December 1992 (age 33); Nanning, Guangxi, China
- Education: Central Academy of Drama
- Occupation: Actor

Jiang Qiming (Chinese: 蒋奇明; born 29 December 1992) is a Chinese actor. He is known for his role as Fu Weijun in The Long Season (2023) and Wang Anquan in Escape from the Trilateral Slopes (2024). He won Best Supporting Actor at the 30th Shanghai Magnolia Awards for his performance in Escape from the Trilateral Slopes.

== Early life ==
Jiang was born in Nanning, Guangxi, on 29 December 1992. His father is a Cai Diao performer, and his mother is a gaohu player. He graduated from the Central Academy of Drama with a major in Acting.

== Career ==
Jiang Qiming began his career as a stage and musical actor. He acted in musicals such as I Do! I Do!, Happiness Doesn't Wait, Murder Ballad, Interview and stage plays I am A Moon, Stuck and Almond Tofu Heart.

In 2020, Jiang made his onscreen acting debut in the film The Sacrifice. In 2021, he starred in the TV drama Left Right. The same year, he starred in the stage play Stuck. In 2023, he starred in the film Journey to the West. The same year, he gained recognition for his role in the suspense drama The Long Season, as Fu Weijun, portraying a deaf and mute.

In 2024, Jiang starred in Escape from the Trilateral Slopes, a performance that received praise and earned him the Best Supporting Actor award at the 30th Magnolia Awards. In 2025, took on his first lead role in the suspense drama Let the Wind Goes By. . He appeared in the film The Way Out. That same year, he starred in the romance film I Swear . He made his return to the stage in 2025 with the play Stuck and starred in the TV drama Man's Inhumanity to Man. He also starred in the 2026 film Once Upon a Time in the Middle East, playing the role of Junsheng.

== Filmography ==
=== Film ===
Year	English title	Chinese title	Role	Ref.
2020	The Sacrifice	金刚川		
2023	Journey to the West	宇宙探索编辑部	Na Risu	
2024	Land of Broken Hearts	负负得正	Dao Mingsi	
2024	Article 20	第二十条		
2025	The Way Out	阳光照耀青春里	Li Dayu	
2025	I Swear	7天	Chen Choushi	
2026	Take Off	飞行家	Li Mingqi	
2026	Once Upon a Time in the Middle East	欢迎来龙餐馆	Ma Junsheng	

=== Television Series ===
Year	English title	Chinese title	Role	Ref.
2022	Left Right	亲爱的小孩	Xiao Xu	
2023	The Long Season	漫长的季节	Fu Weijun	
2023	The Mutations	天启异闻录	He Zijiao	
2024	In the Name of the Brother	哈尔滨一九四四	Tian Xiaojiang	
2024	To the Wonder	我的阿勒泰	Gao Xiaoliang	
2024	Escape from the Trilateral Slopes	边水往事	Wang Anquan	
2025	Let the Wind Goes By	风中的火焰	Liu Bai	
2025	Man's Inhumanity to Man	反人类暴行	Jin Chengming	

== Awards and nominations ==
Year	Award	Category	Nominated Work	Result	Ref.
2022	5th Chinese Theatre Awards	Best Supporting Actor	Stuck	Won	
2025	30th Shanghai Television Festival	Best Supporting Actor in a TV Series	Escape from the Trilateral Slopes	Won	
