= Once Upon a Time in the Middle East =

2026 film by Wen Muye

- Theatrical release poster
- Traditional Chinese: 歡迎來龍餐館
- Simplified Chinese: 欢迎来龙餐馆
- Literal meaning: Welcome to the Loong Restaurant
- Hanyu Pinyin: Huānyíng lái Lóng Cānguǎn
- Directed by: Wen Muye
- Written by: Wen Muye; Lang Qunli; Wei Zhong
- Produced by: Ning Hao; Mohamed Osama
- Starring: Shen Teng; Jiang Qiming
- Cinematography: Wang Boxue
- Music by: Huang Chao
- Production companies: Dirty Monkeys Films Group; Damai Entertainment Holdings; China Film Group; Alibaba Pictures Group; Ruyi Film; Super Lion Culture Communication; General Dream Shanghai Film; Beijing Shangshi Culture Group; Beijing Yuanqi Entertainment Culture; Shanghai Ruyi Film and Television Production
- Release date: August 11, 2026
- Running time: 140 minutes
- Country: China
- Languages: Mandarin; Arabic; English
- Box office: CN¥2.404 billion ($373 million)

Once Upon a Time in the Middle East (Chinese: 欢迎来龙餐馆; pinyin: Huānyíng lái Lóng Cānguǎn; Arabic: مرحبًا بكم في مطعمِ التنينِ, romanized: Marhaban bikum fi maṭ'am al-tannin, lit. 'Welcome to the Loong Restaurant') (Note: Also translated as Welcome to the Dragon Restaurant. "Loong" is the phonetic transcription of Chinese 龙 (lóng, "dragon").) is a 2026 Chinese war film written and directed by Wen Muye and starring Shen Teng and Jiang Qiming. It tells the story of Xu Fu, a philanthropic chef at a Chinese restaurant in the fictional city of Bahata in the Middle East. When a war erupts with the United States, he transforms his restaurant into a refuge for a group of orphans trapped in the city, but he is caught in the crossfire.

Once Upon a Time in the Middle East was released in China on 11 August, 2026. It quickly gained popularity, crossing CN¥1 billion in just 8 days, opening at number one on the Chinese box office charts. It went on to gross more than CN¥2 billion at the Chinese box office and remained at the top of the Chinese box office charts for over a month.

Despite the war depicted in the film being heavily implied to be the 2003 invasion of Iraq, the film never actually mentions what country it takes place in. Wen explained that he did not want to "limit it to any particular war" in history and emphasized the film's timeless and universal human themes, saying that the film's story could even be playing out in the present day.

It was selected as the Chinese entry for Best International Feature Film at the 99th Academy Awards.

== Plot ==
An elderly Xu Fu is questioned by immigration officials while attempting to enter the Middle Eastern country where he once lived. His interrogation prompts him to recall his experiences there more than two decades earlier.

After a workplace disaster, Xu Fu travels to the fictional Middle Eastern city of Bahata to earn money to repay his debts. He becomes the head chef of the Loong Restaurant, owned by Zaid, a local government official, and works alongside Ma Junsheng, the restaurant's Chinese floor manager. Ma is engaged to Lina, a teacher at a nearby orphanage. Among the orphans is Seif, a mischievous boy who frequently visits the restaurant. Although Xu initially finds the children troublesome, he gradually becomes fond of them.

As the restaurant becomes successful, a war with the United States suddenly breaks out. The Chinese government organizes an evacuation of its citizens, but Zaid persuades Xu to remain, offering him a share of the restaurant. Xu stays behind and continues operating the restaurant as the city descends into chaos. The restaurant is protected by the local water and electricity ministry, allowing business to continue even as much of the city suffers from shortages and violence.

After the orphanage is destroyed, several of the children take refuge at the Loong Restaurant. Seif begins helping Xu in the kitchen and eventually becomes his apprentice, learning to cook and speak Chinese. After meeting Tony Wang, a Chinese-American soldier serving with the United States Army, he begins smuggling alcohol into the restaurant. The Loong Restaurant subsequently becomes one of the few places in the city where American soldiers and other customers can obtain alcohol, making Xu increasingly wealthy and causing him to abandon his plans to return to China.

Zaid's fortunes deteriorate when he refuses to pay increasingly high prices demanded by American forces for smuggled medicine to treat his daughter. His house is attacked by anti-Ba'athist forces who kill his wife and daughter, after which Zaid disappears. About a year and a half later, the two men and Seif are arrested by American military police after being suspected of involvement in a car bombing organized by Zaid, who has become a terrorist. They insist that Tony can testify on their behalf, only to learn that Tony was killed in the bombing. Xu, Ma, and Seif are taken to Alifah Prison.

While imprisoned, Xu, Ma, and Seif work as kitchen assistants and become great friends with the prison authorities. They encounter Headmaster Ali, the leader of a militant organization who indoctrinates orphans into child soldiers. Ali is interrogated by Morgan, an American lieutenant who tortures him by hanging him from a rope and forcing him to drink buckets of chili water through a funnel, which Xu had replaced with a harmless substance after empathizing with him. Ali is secretly given a drawing of a Christmas tree. Seif subsequently becomes exposed to Ali's extremist ideology and befriends Jamal, a child being trained by Ali. The boys put chili into Morgan's underwear as a prank, resulting in Xu and Ma being beaten by Morgan. Seif attempts to kill Morgan with a kitchen knife, but it is chained to the table. Xu and Ma placate him.

More than six months later, Xu, Ma, and Seif are cleared of the bombing and are due to be released. However, the prison authorities ask them to stay temporarily to prepare a Christmas feast for the soldiers. On Christmas Eve, they prepare an extravagant feast. While Xu is relaxing on the prison roof, militants disguised as American forces launch an assault on the prison in an attempt to free Ali and the other prisoners. During the fighting, a grenade is thrown toward Xu, Ma, and Seif. Seif attempts to throw it away but it explodes and he loses his left eye. Xu, Ma, and Seif are captured by Zaid and taken to Ali's compound where orphans are being trained as child soldiers, and are forced to work as cooks.

Months later, Xu spends his remaining savings arranging an escape. Seif, ostracized because of his injury, considers joining Ali. When Ali asks the children who is willing to kill Morgan and become the organization's first warrior. Seif volunteers, but Xu prevents him from being selected, allowing Jamal to take his place. Seif hides in the trunk of the militants' vehicle and discovers that the children's missions are actually suicide bombings. After witnessing Jamal's death, Seif realizes that becoming a warrior would only result in his own death.

With the children scheduled to be sent on more missions, Ma devises a plan to delay the organization by causing the children to become ill from eating sprouted potatoes. The plan is discovered, and Xu, Ma, and Seif are interrogated. Ma sacrifices himself and is shot.

Xu and Seif subsequently escape with 23 children who are willing to leave. They travel by van and on foot for an entire day before crossing into a neighboring country and finding refuge in a large mosque. Xu prepares a final meal using what food they have left, making a rice stew for the children. However, Zaid and his followers eventually capture them after crossing the border, as the militant organization also operates in the area.

Zaid eats with Xu before preparing to execute him. Zaid places a hood over Xu's head, ordering Xu to open his mouth and shooting him. The bullet passes straight through Xu's mouth, leaving him severely wounded but alive. Xu is presumed dead and Zaid kidnaps the children to be taken back to Ali's compound. Xu eventually recovers and returns to China and the Loong Restaurant is shut down.

In the present day, the immigration officials permit Xu to return the country. During a bus tour, Xu notices that the Loong Restaurant is still operating. He alights and enters the restaurant, finding that it is fully restored. Xu reads the menu and sees that the final rice dish he prepared for the children has been memorialized as "Xu Fu Rice Stew". After asking about the dish's peculiar name, a waiter explains that it was named after a chef who once prepared the dish for a group of child refugees, but was killed. The waiter then reveals that government forces eventually defeated the militant organization and that Zaid was killed by border patrol, while the children were rescued. Xu walks into the kitchen, where he sees a chef with an eyepatch cooking rice, implying that Seif has survived and is now the head chef of the restaurant .

== Cast ==
- Shen Teng as Xu Fu, Chinese head chef of the Loong Restaurant
- Jiang Qiming as Ma Junsheng, Chinese floor manager of the Loong Restaurant
- Zhang Xiwei as Xu Le, Xu's daughter
- Wei Qing as Xu's mother
- Sherif Sobhy as Zaid, an official of the country's regime and owner of the Loong Restaurant
- Yasmine Rahmy as Amina, Zaid's wife
- Karma Hasim as Susu
- Omar Sherif as Seif, an orphan who becomes an apprentice at the Loong Restaurant
- Naira Al-Qasim as Lina, an orphanage teacher and Ma's fiancée
- Ahmed Salim as Ali, a terrorist warlord
- Faruk Muhammad as Jamal, a child suicide bomber indoctrinated by Ali
- Jason Paul Field as Peter, commander of Alifah Prison
- Russell Shealy as Morgan, an American lieutenant officer from the 800th MP Brigade
- Aarif Rahman as Tony Wang, a Chinese-American private first class from the 1st Armored Division

== Production ==
Once Upon a Time in the Middle East was first conceived by Wen in 2017. Wen stated he was inspired by multiple accounts of Chinese immigrants who ran restaurants in the 2003 invasion of Iraq, finding a contrast between food representing life and war representing death. Chen Xianzhong, a restauranteur in Baghdad who used his restaurant as a sanctuary for journalists, doctors, refugees, and children, and Liu Lei and Shuai Xuejun, two friends who opened the Chinese Dragon restaurant in the US-occupied Green Zone in the aftermath of the invasion of Iraq were notable inspirations. Wen adapted many events seen in the film from their personal experiences and modeled the character of Xu Fu closely after them.

Prior to filming, Wen and the production team conducted several visits to the Middle East to survey locals and capture details to be authentically recreated by the film's art department on set. Wen originally wanted to film entirely in the Middle East, but due to the region being embroiled in conflict, it became impossible. The set for Bahata was intensively constructed in full scale over the course of five months and 100,000 square meters at the Qingdao Oriental Movie Metropolis where a majority of the film was shot. A secondary ruined townscape was created in Shitanjing Subdistrict in Ningxia. A select few scenes which required a Middle Eastern environment were filmed in the Egyptian Sahara. Mohamed Osama Mohamed Ragab, a guest on the 2015 season of talk show Informal Talks, was brought on as a producer to assist with Egyptian casting. Filming began in April 2024 and entered post-production in September of that year. The film was partially shot using IMAX.

Before release, the film had already generated widespread attention through word of mouth and the film's cast and crew making several public appearances. At Weibo Movie Night on 14 June 2026, Shen Teng passed out advertisements to guests, prompting directors in attendance to help promote the film at the event.

== Release ==
In May 2025, Once Upon a Time in the Middle East debuted at the 27th National Film Promotion Conference in Xiamen.

On 8 August, Once Upon a Time in the Middle East premiered in Shanghai Cinema SHO and was attended by the film's cast and crew. Limited advance preview screenings were held from 8–10 August. The film was released in theaters nationwide on 11 August 2026.

Once Upon a Time in the Middle East was released in Hong Kong, Macao, Malaysia, Australia, and New Zealand on 11 September, Singapore on 17 September, and Japan on 18 September. It was released in the United States and Canada on 9 October 2026. It is later scheduled to be released in Europe, the Middle East and North Africa.

== Reception ==
=== Box office ===
Once Upon a Time in the Middle East earned over CN¥180 million ($26.6 million) on its opening day. In 8 days, it had surpassed CN¥1 billion ($148 million), ranking number one at the Chinese box office above Spider-Man: Brand New Day and The Odyssey. Once Upon a Time in the Middle East grossed $232.2 million by its second weekend. It remained at the top of the box office for over six weeks, until it was overtaken by Avengers Endgame: Encore. As of 9 November 2026, Once Upon a Time in the Middle East grossed CN¥2.404 billion ($373 million) from over 66 million ticket sales.

=== Critical reception ===
On the review aggregator website Rotten Tomatoes, the film holds an approval rating of 100% based on 15 reviews, with an average rating of 8.7/10.

Once Upon a Time in the Middle East received exceptionally positive reviews on Chinese-language websites, earning an 8.7, 9.7, and 9.9 out of 10 score on Douban, Maoyan, and Tao Piao Piao respectively. The South China Morning Post commended the film for its "thundering action and heart-wrenching tension", with the caveat that the messaging was "never subtle". Several critics praised Shen Teng's dramatic range and described his "restrained" performance as a departure from his previous comedic roles. The Standard stated that audiences "universally" regarded Shen's performance to be the highlight of his career.

The film received an ambivalent review from Variety, which describes "It’s a vision of wartime brutality that’s both blithely matter-of-fact and desperate to pull at our heartstrings; utterly delusional, in other words, and hard to look away from." According to the Chinese state-owned magazine Sixth Tone, some audience members found the film’s promotional materials misleading as they failed to clearly communicate its violent subject matter.

=== Analysis ===
Many people analyzed the film through the lens of the ongoing 2026 Iran war. Jodie Wen, a political analyst at Tsinghua University, likened Xu's non-combative actions in the film to Chinese mediation efforts in the 2026 Iran War. Chinese state media stated that Once Upon a Time in the Middle East subverted Hollywood war films by representing the voices of non-combatants and having a non-interventionist stance on conflict. State media also argued that American soldiers were depicted sympathetically, and commended it as a "more objective" and "distinctly Chinese perspective on war". CGTN described the work as an anti-war film that embodied the "Chinese values" of peace and harmony; it identified Chinese foreign policy slogan of a community of common destiny for mankind in the film's narrative.

== See also ==
- List of submissions to the 99th Academy Awards for Best International Feature Film
- List of Chinese submissions for the Academy Award for Best International Feature Film
