= Sichuan Airlines Flight 8633 =

2018 aviation incident over China

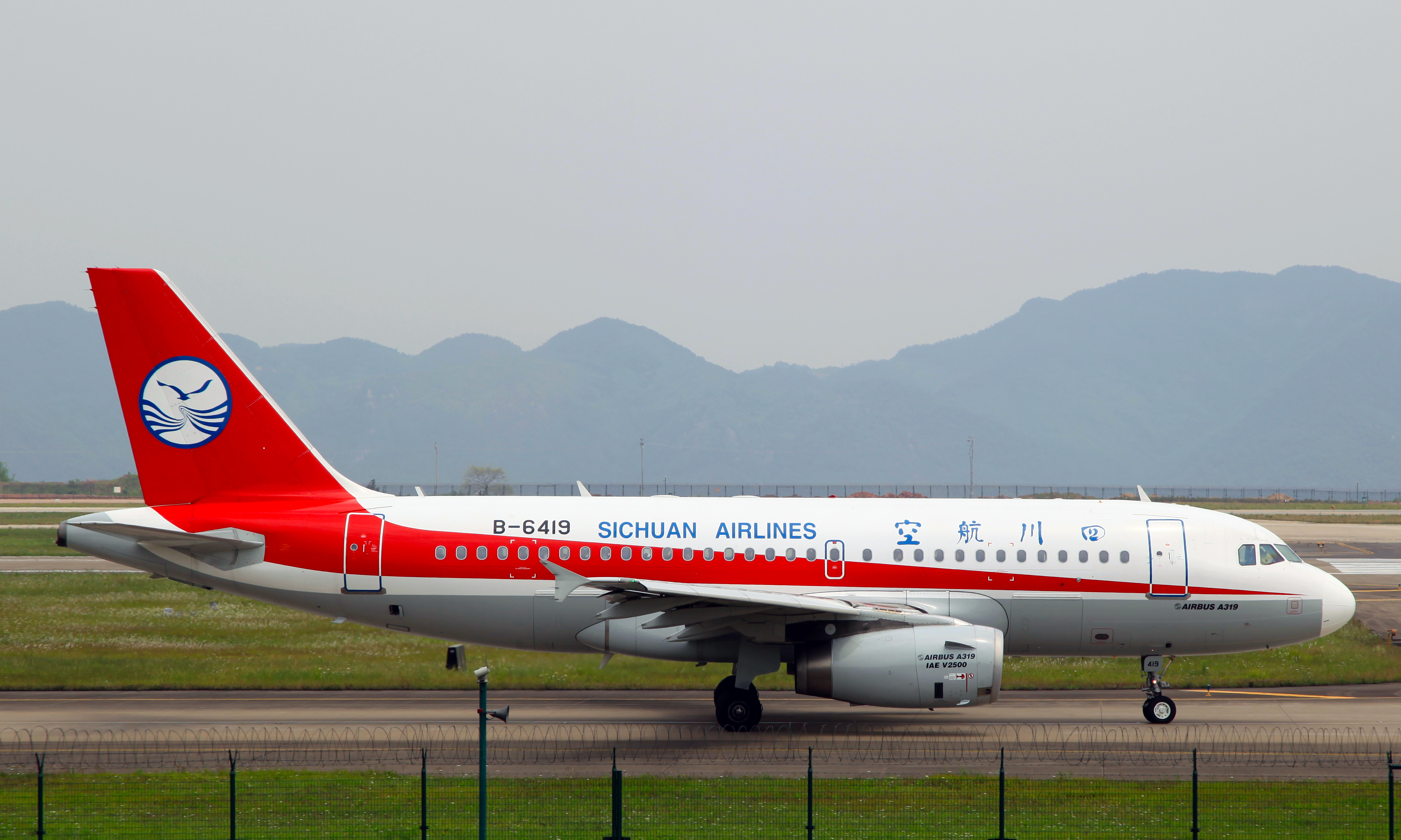
- B-6419, the aircraft involved in the incident, photographed in 2013

Incident
- Date: 14 May 2018
- Summary: Windshield failure leading to uncontrolled decompression
- Site: Near Xiaojin County, Sichuan Province, China

Aircraft
- Aircraft type: Airbus A319-133
- Operator: Sichuan Airlines
- IATA flight No.: 3U8633
- ICAO flight No.: CSC8633
- Call sign: SICHUAN 8633
- Registration: B-6419
- Flight origin: Chongqing Jiangbei International Airport, Chongqing, Yubei District, China
- Destination: Lhasa Gonggar Airport, Lhasa, Tibet Autonomous Region, China
- Occupants: 128
- Passengers: 119
- Crew: 9
- Fatalities: 0
- Injuries: 2
- Survivors: 128

Sichuan Airlines Flight 8633 was a flight from Chongqing Jiangbei International Airport to Lhasa Gonggar Airport on 14 May 2018, which was forced to make an emergency landing at Chengdu Shuangliu International Airport after the cockpit windshield failed. The aircraft involved was an Airbus A319. The incident was adapted into the 2019 film The Captain and was also featured in the documentary series Mayday.

== Aircraft and crew ==
The aircraft involved was an Airbus A319-133, serial number 4660, registration B-6419. The aircraft was delivered to Sichuan Airlines on 26 July 2011. It was powered by two IAE V2527M-A5 engines. As of 14 May 2018, the aircraft had recorded more than 19,900 flight hours and 12,920 cycles before the incident. In addition to the 3 pilots, the jetliner also carried 6 cabin crew and 119 passengers.

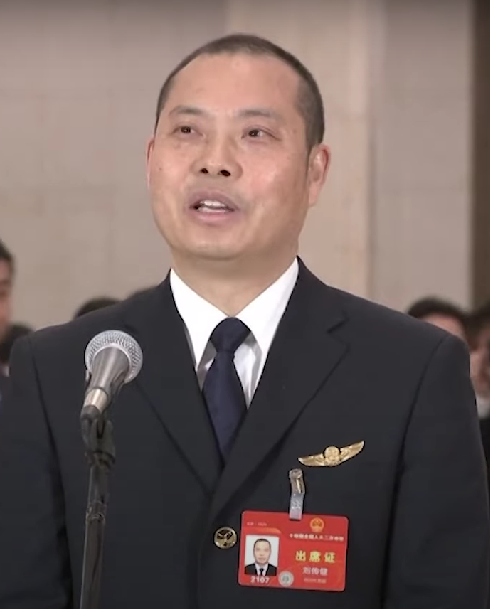
Liu Chuanjian, the captain involved in the incident

The pilots were Captain Liu Chuanjian (刘传健, 45), who had logged 11,400 flight hours including 9,200 on A319; Captain Liang Peng (梁鹏, 33), who had logged 8,700 flight hours including 6,700 on A319; and First Officer Xu Ruichen (徐瑞辰, 27), who had logged 2,800 flight hours including 1,100 on A319. Before Liu joined Sichuan Airlines in 2006, he worked as a flight instructor for ten years in Sichuan's Second Aviation College of People's Liberation Army Air Force.

== Incident ==
On 14 May 2018, Flight 8633 took off from Chongqing Jiangbei International Airport at 6:25 CST (22:25 UTC). Approximately 40 minutes after departure while over Xiaojin County, Sichuan, at the altitude of 9 km (30,000 ft; 9,000 m), the right front segment of the windshield separated from the aircraft followed by an uncontrolled decompression. As a result of the sudden decompression, the autopilot panel was damaged, and the loud external noise made spoken communications extremely difficult. The co-pilot, however, was able to use the transponder to squawk 7700, alerting Chengdu Shuangliu International Airport control about their situation. Because the flight was within a mountainous region, the pilots were unable to descend to the required 8,000 ft (2,400 m) to compensate for the loss of cabin pressure.

About 35 minutes later, the jetliner made an emergency landing at 7:42 CST (23:42 UTC) at Chengdu Shuangliu International Airport. The aircraft was overweight on landing. As a result, the plane took a longer distance to come to a stop.

Despite wearing a seatbelt, first officer Xu was partially blown out of the aircraft. He suffered facial abrasions, a minor right eye injury and a sprained wrist. One of the flight attendants on the aircraft, Zhou Yanwen (周彦雯), also suffered a wrist injury and received treatment. Owing to the insulation design of the Airbus A319, the temperature did not drop immediately for the passengers, despite the cockpit's exposure to the outside environment, saving them from frostbite. Even though the plane was unable to descend at the time of the incident due to the surrounding terrain, the flight crew remained conscious and did not experience hypoxia or frostbite. No other crew member or passenger was injured.

== Investigations ==
The incident was investigated by the Civil Aviation Administration of China, Airbus and Sichuan Airlines. In accordance with the Chicago Convention on International Civil Aviation's Annex 13 regulation, Airbus refrained from any further comment on their progress. On 2 June 2020, the final report was released. The root cause of the incident was damage to the seal on the right-hand side windshield, which caused moisture to penetrate and remain in the cavity on the bottom edge of the windshield. The insulation of wires in the windshield heating system was reduced after being soaked for a long time, resulting in continuous arc discharges at the bottom left corner of the windshield. This led to local high temperatures and breakage of the windshield's double-layer structure. As a result, the windshield could no longer withstand the pressure difference between inside and outside the cockpit and burst off from the fuselage. In addition, the flight control problems were found to be caused by the cockpit door opening as designed to prevent a pressure difference between the cockpit and cabin. The force of the door opening however, resulted in 17 circuit breakers popping, leading to a loss of utility from linked systems.

== Aftermath ==
The crew of Sichuan Airlines Flight 8633 were hailed as heroes by the public media and the captain, Liu Chuanjian, was given an award of 5 million yuan (£569,400).

As of July 2019, the crew and pilots were still working for Sichuan Airlines, and the airline was still operating flight 3U8633, on the same route. The aircraft B-6419 was repaired and returned to service with Sichuan Airlines on 18 January 2019. It remains in service with Sichuan Airlines today.

== In popular culture ==
The incident was adapted into the film The Captain, directed by Andrew Lau. The film, released during the 70th anniversary of the People's Republic of China in 2019, ranked second at the box office during the national holiday.

The incident on Sichuan Airlines Flight 8633 was featured in the 2023 episode "Cockpit Catastrophe", of the Canadian-made, internationally distributed documentary series Mayday.

== See also ==
- British Airways Flight 5390, a similar incident
