= The Intouchables =

2011 French film by Éric Toledano and Olivier Nakache

- Theatrical release poster
- French: Intouchables
- Directed by: Éric Toledano; Olivier Nakache
- Written by: Olivier Nakache; Éric Toledano
- Produced by: Nicolas Duval Adassovsky; Yann Zenou; Laurent Zeitoun
- Starring: François Cluzet; Omar Sy
- Cinematography: Mathieu Vadepied
- Edited by: Reynald Bertrand
- Music by: Ludovico Einaudi
- Production companies: Gaumont; TF1 Films Production; Quad Productions; Chaocorp; Ten Films
- Distributed by: Gaumont
- Release dates: 23 September 2011 (San Sebastian); 2 November 2011 (France)
- Running time: 112 minutes
- Country: France
- Language: French
- Budget: €9.5 million ($10.8 million)
- Box office: $426.6 million

The Intouchables (French: Intouchables, pronounced [ɛ̃tuʃablə]), also known as Untouchable in the UK, Ireland, and Scandinavia, and 1+1 in Eastern Europe, is a 2011 French buddy comedy-drama film written and directed by Éric Toledano and Olivier Nakache. It stars François Cluzet and Omar Sy. The plot of the film is inspired by the true story of Philippe Pozzo di Borgo and his French-Algerian carer Abdel Sellou, discovered by the directors in À la vie, à la mort, a documentary film.

Nine weeks after its release in France on 2 November 2011, it became the second highest-grossing French film in France, after the 2008 film Welcome to the Sticks. The film was voted the cultural event of 2011 in France with 52% of votes in a poll by Fnac. Until it was eclipsed in 2014 by Lucy, it was the most-viewed French film in the world with 51.5 million tickets sold.

The film received positive reviews and several award nominations. In France, the film won the César Award for Best Actor for Sy and garnered seven further nominations for the César Awards, including the César Award for Best Actor for Cluzet. Five percent of the film's profits were donated to Simon de Cyrène, an association that helps paralyzed people.

== Plot ==
At night in Paris, Driss is driving Philippe's Maserati Quattroporte at high speed. Chased through the streets by the police, they are eventually cornered. Driss claims the quadriplegic Philippe must get to a hospital urgently; Philippe pretends to have a seizure and the fooled police officers escort them. After arriving at the hospital, Driss drives away.

The story of friendship between the two men is then told as a flashback: Philippe, a wealthy quadriplegic owner of a luxurious hôtel particulier, and his assistant Magalie are interviewing potential live-in caregivers. Driss has no ambitions to get hired; he is only waiting to get a signature on a document proving his interview was rejected, to continue receiving his benefits. He is told to return the next morning to collect his signed document.

The next day when Driss returns, Philippe's aide Yvonne greets him, telling him he has the job on a trial basis. Despite being uninterested and inexperienced, he does well caring for Philippe, albeit using unconventional methods. Driss learns the extent of his employer's disability, aiding Philippe in every aspect of his life. A friend of Philippe's reveals that Driss was imprisoned for six months for robbery, but Philippe disregards the warnings, stating he does not care about Driss' past. As Driss is the only one who does not treat Philippe with pity, he will not fire Driss as long as he does his job properly.

Philippe explains his disability resulted from a paragliding incident and that his wife died without bearing children. Gradually, Driss helps him to organise his private life, despite having problems with his adopted daughter Elisa. Driss discovers modern art, opera and starts painting. For Philippe's birthday, a private classical music concert is performed in his living room. Driss later finds Elisa in her room and discovers she had taken pills because her boyfriend dumped on her, she asks Driss to talk to him in exchange for money. Philippe educates Driss on famous classical pieces, but Driss only recognises them as advert music or cartoon themes. Feeling the concert is too boring, Driss plays Earth, Wind & Fire's "Boogie Wonderland", livening up the party, with the guests also enjoying the music.

Discovering Philippe has a purely epistolary relationship with a woman called Eléonore who lives in Dunkirk, Driss encourages his employer to meet her, but Philippe fears her reaction when she discovers his disability. Driss persuades him to talk to her by phone. Philippe agrees to send a photo of himself in a wheelchair to her, but he hesitates and asks his aide, Yvonne, to send a picture as he was before his accident. A date between them is agreed to, but Philippe is too scared to meet Eléonore at the last minute and leaves with Yvonne before she arrives. Philippe then calls Driss, inviting him to fly with him in his Dassault Falcon 900 private jet for a paragliding weekend in the Alps.

Driss's cousin, Adama, in trouble with a gang, comes to fetch Driss at the mansion on the pretext of delivering mail. Overhearing, Philippe recognizes Driss's need to be supportive to his family and releases him from his job, suggesting he may not want to push a wheelchair all his life.

Driss returns home, joins his friends and manages to help his cousin. In the meantime new carers have replaced Driss but Philippe is not happy with any of them. His morale is very low and he stops taking care of himself. He grows a beard and looks ill. Worried, Yvonne calls Driss back.

Upon arrival Driss drives Philippe in the Maserati, which brings the story back to the initial police chase. After they elude the police, Driss takes Philippe to the seaside. Once Philippe has shaved and dressed, they arrive at a Cabourg restaurant on the sea front. Driss suddenly leaves the table, saying good luck to Philippe on his lunch date. A few seconds later Eléonore arrives. Emotionally touched, Philippe looks through the window and sees Driss outside, smiling at him. Driss bids Philippe farewell and walks away as Phillipe and Eléonore chat and enjoy each other's company.

The film ends with shots of Philippe Pozzo di Borgo and Abdel Sellou, the people on whom the story is based, together on a hillside, reminiscent of the paragliding scene earlier in the film. The closing caption states that the men remain close friends to this day.

== Cast ==
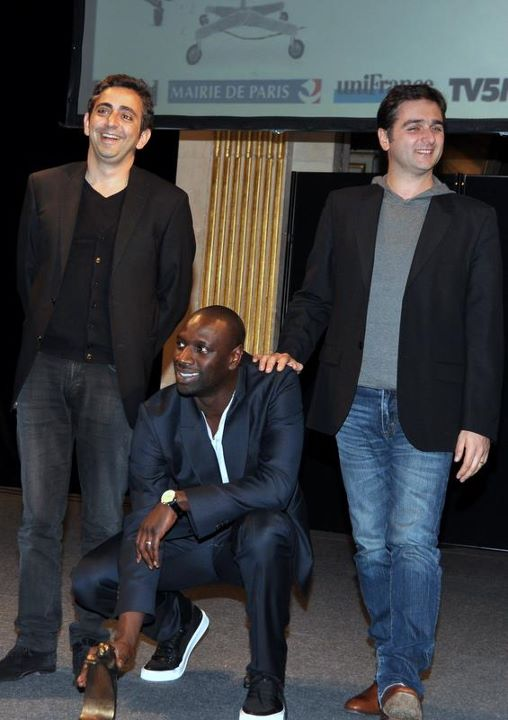
Directors Éric Toledano and Olivier Nakache with star Omar Sy at the 2012 Lumière Awards ceremony.

- François Cluzet as Philippe
- Omar Sy as Bakary "Driss" Bassari
- Audrey Fleurot as Magalie
- Anne Le Ny as Yvonne
- Clotilde Mollet as Marcelle
- Alba Gaïa Bellugi as Elisa
- Joséphine de Meaux as Nathalie Lecomte
- Cyril Mendy as Adama, Driss's cousin
- Christian Ameri as Albert
- Grégoire Oestermann as Antoine
- Marie-Laure Descoureaux as Chantal
- Absa Dialou Toure as Mina
- Salimata Kamate as Fatou
- Thomas Soliveres as Bastien
- Dorothée Brière-Meritte as Éléonore
- Caroline Bourg as Freddy
- Émilie Caen as Gallerist

== Soundtrack ==
1. Ludovico Einaudi – "Fly" (3:20)
2. Earth, Wind & Fire – "September" (3:33)
3. Omar Sy, François Cluzet & Audrey Fleurot – "Des références..." (1:08)
4. Ludovico Einaudi – "Writing Poems" (4:09)
5. George Benson – "The Ghetto" (4:57)
6. Omar Sy & François Cluzet – "L'arbre qui chante" (1:01)
7. Terry Callier – "You're Goin' Miss Your Candyman" (7:18)
8. François Cluzet & Omar Sy – "Blind Test" (2:21)
9. Earth, Wind & Fire with The Emotions – "Boogie Wonderland" (4:45)
10. Ludovico Einaudi – "L'origine nascosta" (3:12)
11. Nina Simone – "Feeling Good" (2:53)
12. Ludovico Einaudi – "Cache-cache" (3:51)
13. Angelicum De Milan – "Vivaldi: Concerto pour 2 violons & Orchestra" (3:21)
14. Ludovico Einaudi – "Una mattina" (6:41)

== Reception ==
=== Box office ===
After four weeks, by 25 November 2011, The Intouchables had already become the most-watched film in France in 2011. After sixteen weeks, more than 19 million people had seen the film in France. On 10 January 2012, The Intouchables set a record, having been number one for ten consecutive weeks since its release in France. The film has grossed $166 million in France and $444.7 million worldwide as of 12 May 2013.

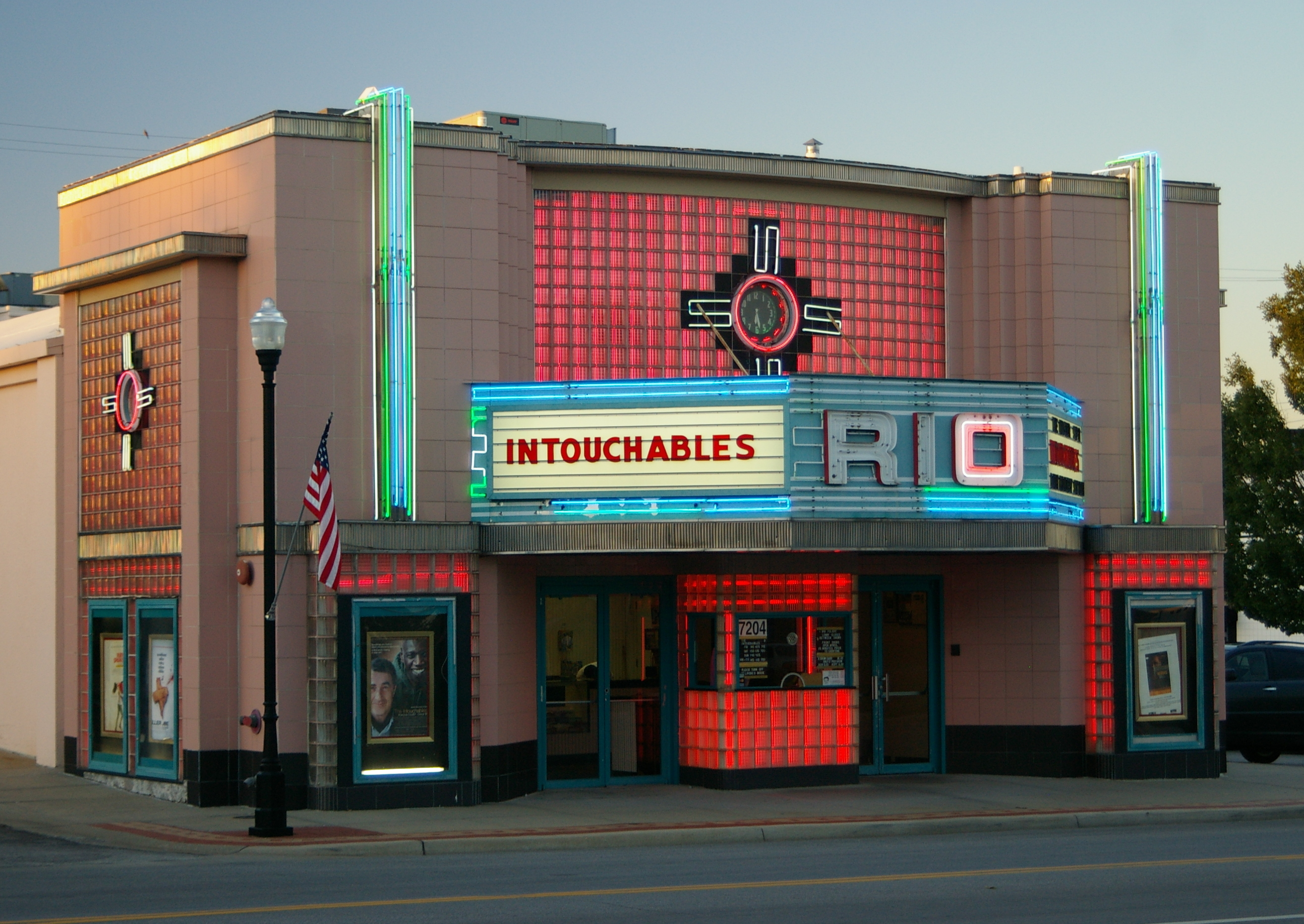
Intouchables showing at a Kansas movie theater in September 2012

On 20 March 2012, The Intouchables broke the record for the highest-grossing French film, surpassing The Fifth Element ($263.9 million). In July 2012, it became the top grossing foreign language film of 2012 in North America, surpassing A Separation.

The film was also a commercial success in several other European countries, topping charts in Germany for nine consecutive weeks, Switzerland for eleven weeks, Austria for six weeks, Poland for three weeks, and Italy, Spain and Belgium for one week, as of 20 May 2012.

- With more than 30 million tickets sold outside France it is the most successful French film shot in French since at least 1994.
- In the United States, it is the fourth highest-grossing French-language film since 1980.
- In Germany, it is the most successful French film shot in any language since at least 1968.
- In Italy, it is the most successful French film shot in French since at least 1997.
- In Spain, it is the second most successful French film shot in French since at least 1994 behind Asterix & Obelix Take on Caesar (3.7 million admissions) released in 1999.
- In South Korea, it is the most successful French film shot in French since at least 1994.
- In Switzerland, it is the most successful French film shot in any language and the second most successful film from any nationalities behind Titanic, since at least 1995.
- In Belgium, it is the second most successful French film shot in any language since at least 1996 behind Bienvenue chez les Ch'tis (1,148,179 admissions).
- In Austria, it is the most successful French film shot in any language since at least 1994.
- In the Netherlands, it is the most successful French film shot in any language since at least 1994.
- In Poland, it is the fourth most successful French film shot in French since at least 1998 behind Amélie (758,201 admissions), Asterix at the Olympic Games (685,800 admissions) and Asterix & Obelix: Mission Cleopatra (680,010 admissions).
- In Israel, it is the most successful French film shot in French since at least 2002.
- In Canada (French), it is the fourth most successful French film shot in French since 1 January 2000 (as of 29 March 2012) behind Asterix & Obelix: Mission Cleopatra (651,582 admissions), Amélie (569,523 tickets) and The Chorus (364,052 tickets sold).
- In Portugal, with 146,000 tickets sold in 5 weeks, it is the 6th most successful French film shot in French since at least 1994.
- In Japan, it is the most successful French film ever.

Rank	Country	Tickets sold
1	France	19,385,740
2	Germany	9,000,539
3	Spain	2,580,856
4	Italy	2,495,738
5	South Korea	1,718,097
6	Switzerland	1,431,329
7	Japan	1,311,452
8	United States / Canada	1,143,200
9	Netherlands	1,056,026
10	Belgium / Luxembourg	961,820
11	Brazil	901,735
12	Austria	713,439
13	Denmark	644,000
14	Poland	515,584
15	Israel	300,000
16	Canada (French)	254,435
17	Portugal	197,411
18	Russia (CIS)	175,475
19	Greece	110,933
20	Taiwan	100,000
21	Colombia	100,000
22	Hong Kong	88,400
23	Hungary (Budapest)	75,512
24	Finland	71,510
25	Peru	65,074
26	Czech Republic	60,004
27	Turkey	42,654
28	Croatia	41,261
29	Romania	23,163
30	Lebanon	18,000
31	Slovenia	17,152
32	Serbia / Montenegro	15,835
33	Bulgaria	10,846
34	Ukraine	12,000
35	Lithuania	1,207
	Total outside France	31,042,614
	Worldwide total	50,482,614
	Worldwide gross	$444,700,000

=== Critical response ===
The film received mostly positive reviews from critics and holds a 75% approval rating at the film review aggregation site Rotten Tomatoes, based on 122 reviews, and an average score of 6.7/10. The consensus states, "It handles its potentially prickly subject matter with kid gloves, but Intouchables gets by thanks to its strong cast and some remarkably sensitive direction." On Metacritic, the film has a score of 57 out of 100, based on 31 ratings of professional critics. Audiences surveyed by CinemaScore gave the film an average grade of "A" on an A+ to F scale.

=== Critical response in the UK ===
The film divided critics in the UK. Upon the film's 21 September 2012 UK release under the title Untouchable, The Independent called it "a third-rate buddy movie that hardly understands its own condescension....Why has the world flipped for this movie? Maybe it's the fantasy it spins on racial/social/cultural mores, much as Driving Miss Daisy did 20-odd years ago – uptight rich white employer learns to love through black employee's life-force. That was set in the segregationist America of the 1940s. What's this film's excuse?" Robbie Collin of The Daily Telegraph called it "as broad, accessible and trombonishly unsubtle as a subtitled Driving Miss Daisy"; according to Collin, the "characters are conduits for charisma rather than great dramatic roles, but the horseplay between Sy and Cluzet is often very funny, and one joke bounces merrily into the next." Nigel Farndale, also of The Daily Telegraph, said: "The film, which is about to be released in Britain, has been breaking box-office records in France and Germany, and one of the reasons seems to be that it gives the audience permission to laugh with, not at, people with disabilities, and see their lives as they have never seen them before."

=== Accolades ===
The film won the Tokyo Sakura Grand Prix award given to the best film at the Tokyo International Film Festival and the Award for Best Actor to both Francois Cluzet and Omar Sy in 2011. At the César Awards 2012, the film received eight nominations. Omar Sy received the César Award for Best Actor on 24 February 2012 for the role of Driss (defeating Jean Dujardin, nominated for The Artist) and being the first French African actor to receive this honor.

In September 2012, it was announced that The Intouchables had been selected as the French entry for the Best Foreign Language Oscar for the 85th Academy Awards. In December 2012, it made the January shortlist, but was ultimately not selected for inclusion among the final nominees.

List of awards and nominations
Award	Category	Recipients and nominees	Result
African-American Film Critics Association	Best Foreign Film		Won
British Academy Film Awards	Best Film Not in the English Language	Eric Toledano, Olivier Nakache, Nicolas Duval Adassovsky, Yann Zenou, Laurent Zeitoun	Nominated
Broadcast Film Critics Association	Best Foreign Language Film		Nominated
César Awards	Best Film		Nominated
César Awards	Best Director	Eric Toledano and Olivier Nakache	Nominated
César Awards	Best Actor	Omar Sy	Won
César Awards	Best Actor	François Cluzet	Nominated
César Awards	Best Supporting Actress	Anne Le Ny	Nominated
César Awards	Best Original Screenplay	Eric Toledano and Olivier Nakache	Nominated
César Awards	Best Cinematography	Mathieu Vadepied	Nominated
César Awards	Best Editing	Dorian Rigal-Ansous	Nominated
César Awards	Best Sound	Pascal Armant, Jean Goudier, and Jean-Paul Hurier	Nominated
Chicago Film Critics Association	Best Foreign-Language Film		Nominated
Czech Lion Awards	Best Foreign Language Film		Won
David di Donatello Awards	Best European Film		Won
European Film Awards	Best Film		Nominated
European Film Awards	Best Actor	François Cluzet and Omar Sy	Nominated
European Film Awards	Best Screenwriter	Eric Toledano and Olivier Nakache	Nominated
Golden Globe Awards	Best Foreign Language Film		Nominated
Golden Trailer Awards	Best Music		Nominated
Golden Trailer Awards	Best Foreign Comedy Trailer		Won
Goya Awards	Best European Film		Won
Houston Film Critics Society	Best Foreign Language Film		Nominated
NAACP Image Awards	Outstanding International Motion Picture		Won
Phoenix Film Critics Society	Best Foreign-Language Film		Won
San Diego Film Critics Society	Best Foreign Language Film		Nominated
Satellite Awards	Best Foreign Language Film		Won
Satellite Awards	Best Actor – Motion Picture Musical or Comedy	Omar Sy	Nominated
St. Louis Gateway Film Critics Association	Best Foreign-Language Film		Won
Tokyo International Film Festival	Tokyo Grand Prix		Won
Tokyo International Film Festival	Best Actor	François Cluzet and Omar Sy	Won
Vilnius International Film Festival	Best Film (The Audience Award)		Won
Washington D. C. Area Film Critics Association	Best Foreign Language Film		Nominated
London's Favourite French Film 2013	Best Film		Won

== Home media ==
In the United States, the film released on DVD in March 2013. It grossed $5.7 million in DVD sales, as of April 2022.

In the United Kingdom, it was 2013's second best-selling foreign language film on physical home video formats, second only to the Indonesian action film The Raid. It was later the UK's ninth best-selling foreign language film of 2016, and second best-selling French film (behind Victor Young Perez).

=== Television ===
In the United Kingdom, it was watched by 213,500 viewers on BBC Two in 2016, making it the year's third most-watched foreign language film on UK television.

== Remakes ==
=== Indian ===
In 2015 it was announced that Vamsi Paidipally would be directing an Indian adaptation titled Oopiri, which was a bilingual film simultaneously shot and released in both Telugu and Tamil as Thozha. Both versions stars Karthi and Nagarjuna as its male leads. They were released on 25 March 2016.

In 2014, rights to The Intouchables were sold to Bollywood filmmakers Karan Johar and Guneet Monga. Johar's Dharma Productions and Monga's Sikhya Entertainment announced that they would produce a Hindi remake, which would be directed by Mohit Suri. In October 2023, Collin D'Cunha was reported to be the director.

=== Spanish (Argentina) ===
In 2016, an Argentinian remake was written and directed by Marcos Carnevale. It was named Inseparables, starring Oscar Martínez and Rodrigo de la Serna as Felipe and Tito respectively, with Carla Peterson, Alejandra Flechner, Franco Masini, Flavia Palmeiro, and more as supportive roles.

=== Spanish (Mexico) ===
In 2026, a Mexican version in the form of a Play was begun to be shown in the Teatro Centenario Coyoacán in Mexico City. It was adapted and directed by Angélica Rogel, starring Tony Dalton as Felipe, and Manuel Cruz Rivas or Sebastián Dante alternating role as Abel, with Daniela Luján, Mónica Dionne, Daniel Bretón and María Thisle joining the cast.

=== English (United States) ===
In July 2011, in addition to acquiring distribution rights in English-speaking countries, Scandinavian countries and China, The Weinstein Company acquired the rights to remake The Intouchables in English. In June 2012, Paul Feig was slated to direct and write the script, with Chris Rock, Jamie Foxx and Idris Elba eyed for the role of Abdel, Colin Firth in talks for Phillip, and Jessica Chastain and Michelle Williams considered for a female lead.

By March 2013, Feig dropped out of directing, with Tom Shadyac in talks to replace him, and Chris Tucker was in consideration for Abdel. In October 2014, Kevin Hart was cast as Abdel, with Firth still attached as Phillip. In March 2016, it was announced that Bryan Cranston was cast, replacing Firth. Simon Curtis was to direct Cranston and Hart from a screenplay written by Feig. By August 2016, Curtis presumably dropped out of directing. Neil Burger was announced as his replacement. A script by Jon Hartmere would be used rather than Feig's work.

In January 2017, Nicole Kidman and Genevieve Angelson joined the cast of the film, then officially titled Untouchable. In February 2017, Aja Naomi King and Julianna Margulies joined the cast. On 2 August 2017, the film's title was changed to The Upside. The film was released on 11 January 2019, earning a box office of $125.9 million worldwide.

=== Turkish ===
Yan Yana is a 2025 Turkish comedy drama film directed by Mert Baykal, written by Aziz Kedi and Feyyaz Yiğit. It is a remake of the French 2011 film The Intouchables, and the film follows a wealthy man, Refik (Haluk Bilginer), paralysed after an accident, hires a caregiver, Ferruh (Feyyaz Yiğit), from a completely different background. The unlikely relationship between these two opposite characters soon transforms into a powerful friendship that changes their lives.

== See also ==
- List of submissions to the 85th Academy Awards for Best Foreign Language Film
- List of French submissions for the Academy Award for Best Foreign Language Film
