= Inseparables (2016 film) =

- Poster
- Directed by: Marcos Carnevale
- Screenplay by: Marcos Carnevale
- Based on: Intouchables by Éric Toledano, Olivier Nakache
- Produced by: Carlos Mentasti; Luis A. Scalella
- Starring: Oscar Martínez; Rodrigo De La Serna
- Cinematography: Horacio Maira
- Edited by: Luis Barros
- Production company: Argentina Sono Film
- Distributed by: Buena Vista International
- Release date: 11 August 2016
- Country: Argentina
- Language: Spanish

Inseparables (transl. Inseparable) is a 2016 Argentinian comedy drama film directed by Marcos Carnevale. It is a remake of the 2011 French film Intouchables. The film stars Oscar Martínez and Rodrigo De La Serna.

== Cast ==
- Oscar Martínez as Felipe
- Rodrigo De La Serna as Tito
- Carla Peterson as Verónica
- Alejandra Flechner as Ivonne
- Flavia Palmiero as Sofía
- Rita Pauls as Elisa
- Franco Masini as Bautista
- Joaquín Flamini as Javier “Javi”
- Javier Niklison as Antonio

== Release ==
The Argentinian theatrical release, with more than 350,000 admissions, grossed 1,797,217 dollars.

=== Home Video ===
The film was released on DVD by SP Films for Blu Shine SRL in 2017.

== Reception ==
Diego Battle, writing for La Nación, found the film enjoyable.

FilmInk gave the film a mixed review, stating "what truly lets the film down, is director Marcos Carnevale seemingly not wanting to deviate too much from the source material."
