= Du Shiniang =

Famous prostitute of the Ming dynasty and related literary works

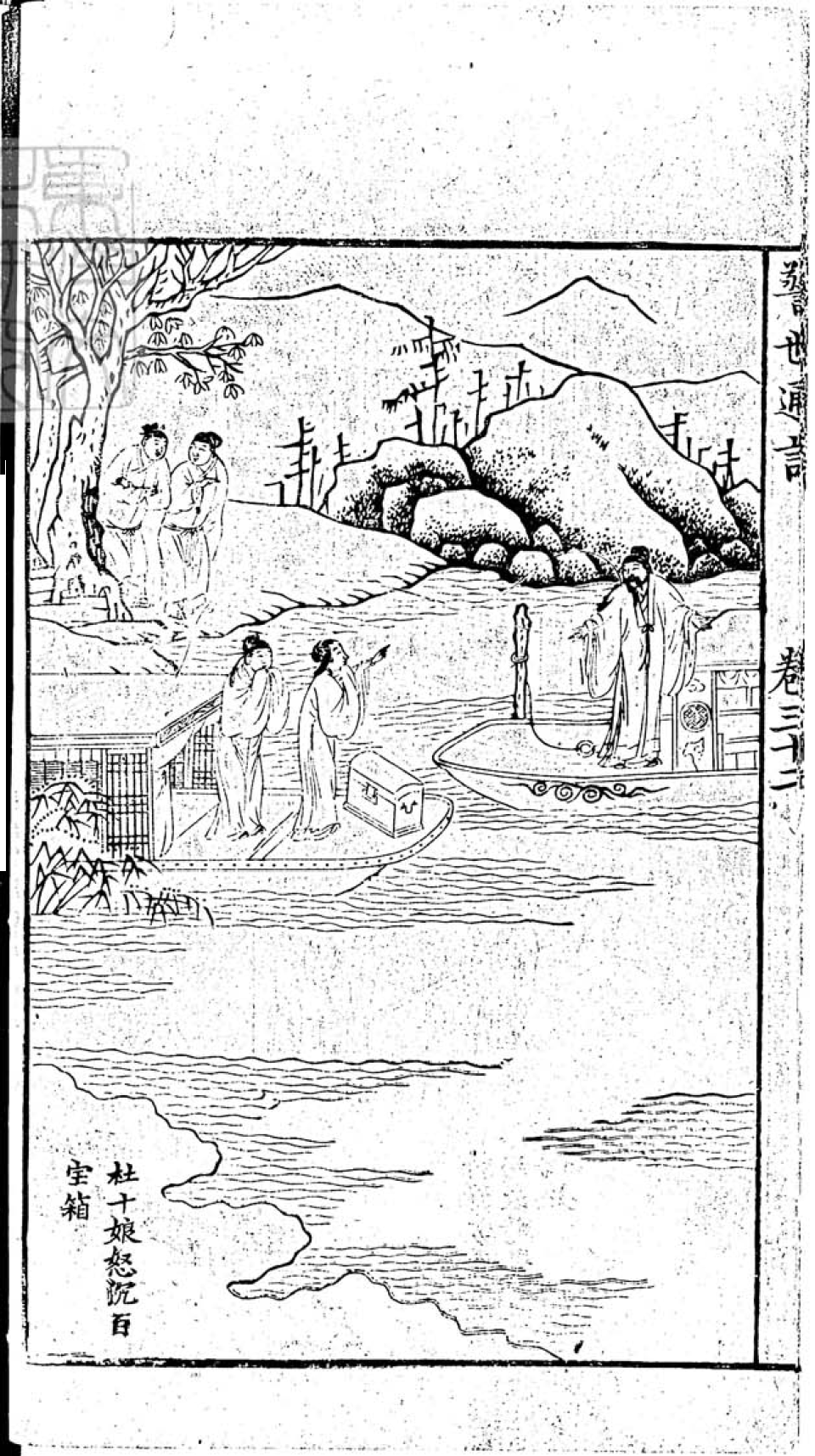
The story of Du Shiniang, as illustrated in a 1620s printed book of the late Ming dynasty

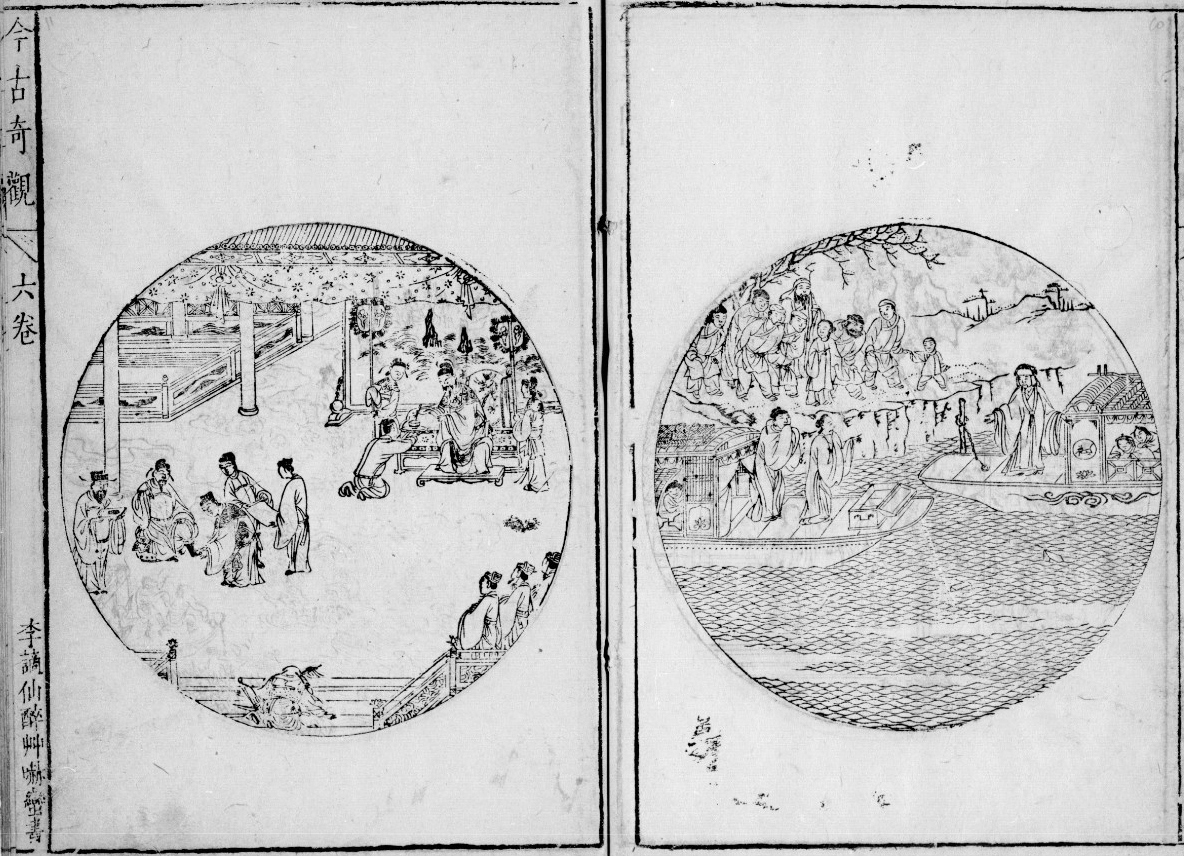
Illustrations of Du Shiniang's story as it appears in a 1640s printed book

Du Shiniang (杜十娘) is a popular story and theatre plot in China. It exists as a Yue opera, as a Sichuan opera, and also as a 2006 "hybrid" Chinese-language western-style opera in the repertoire of the China Central Opera. The plot concerns the prostitute Du Shiniang, Miss Tenth-Daughter Du, who falls in love with a literati, Li Jia.

"Du Shiniang Angrily Sinks a Treasure Chest" is a short parody novel by Ming dynasty novelist Feng Menglong, and it is one of the most familiar sources to most modern readers when it comes to this story.

== Character ==
Du Shiniang is one of the central characters in both "The Legend of the Emotionally Negative Lovers" and "Du Shiniang Sinks the Hundred Treasure Boxes". For the image of Du Shiniang in the two works, researchers generally believe that the portrayal of the main character Du Shiniang in "The Legend of Du Shiniang Sinks the Baibao Box" is more vivid and flexible than that in "The Legend of Du Shiniang Sinks the Baibao Box", especially for the enrichment of Du Shiniang's words and actions and personality, which makes the image of Du Shiniang, a wise and steadfast woman, particularly brilliant in Chinese literary history. However, the images of Du Shiniang in the two works are very different, both in terms of ideology and character, and they have their own characteristics, which cannot be judged simply by which is better or worse.

== An Analysis of the Causes of Du Shiniang's Tragedy ==
There are many reasons for Du Shiniang's tragedy. The direct cause is Li Jia's treachery and Sun Fu's instigation, but the root cause is the feudal concept of family status. (1) The concept of feudal family status. Du Shiniang is a smart and beautiful woman who strayed into prostitution. From the day she was sold to a brothel, she lost her freedom in life and became a "commodity" that can be freely bought and sold by others. The difference between Du Shiniang and Li Jia is too big, one is a prostitute and the other is a son of a rich family, they are not compatible in any way, not to mention that Li Jia's family is a typical feudal noble family, who especially values and maintains the feudal family. Family concept, patriarchal ethics. Li Jia's father is a spokesperson for feudal ethics, he will never allow his son to marry a prostitute and go home. Although Du Shiniang resisted, in a society where men are superior to women, men are superior and women have no status. It is impossible for a prostitute who longs for freedom and love to live at the bottom of society to change her destiny. It can be seen that it was the feudal system that caused Du Shiniang's tragic ending. (2) Li Jia's treachery. Li Jia is a son of an aristocratic class. His selfishness, meanness, and love of money are the direct reasons for Du Shiniang's suicide. Among the many characters, Li Jia is the one who seemed to be "honest and sincere", but unexpectedly Li Jia was a person who sold her to others for money. Li Jia is a noble son of the aristocratic class. He is only greedy for beauty and does not understand love. He does not understand Du Shiniang's inner pain and desire to pursue a happy life at all. He seems to be "honest and sincere", but deep down he is a timid and selfish villain. He also understood that it was against morality for him to be with a prostitute, and that it was impossible for him to be accepted by his family. On the way home, he kept thinking about how to get his father's forgiveness. Until he met Sun Fu, some words of Sun Fu touched Li Jia's heart, and finally he sold Shiniang to Sun Fu for his daughter. He loves money more than love, and he can be moved by Du Shiniang's love in a short period of time, but when love and money conflict, he will violate his oath and sell love for money. Li Jia's hypocrisy awakened Shiniang's beautiful dream. She was completely desperate and saw it through. At the same time, she also understood that she could not change her destiny. In desperation, he threw himself into the river. (3) Sun Fu's instigation. Sun Fu is a hypocritical, despicable and shameless salt merchant. When he saw Du Shiniang, he fell in love with Du Shiniang at a glance, so he had evil intentions; he instigated Li Jia to sell Shiniang to him, telling Li Jia that if he brought a woman like Du Shiniang home, his father would definitely not accept it, and neither would his brothers and relatives. He also told Li Jia that if he abandoned his family because of a prostitute, his reputation would definitely be damaged and make it difficult to be a human being. He also grasped that Li Jia had no money and could not go home to explain, and expressed that he was willing to give a thousand pieces of silver in exchange for Shi Niang. Under Sun Fu's instigation, Li Jia wavered for money, so he sold Shiniang to Sun Fu as a commodity.
