= List of Chinese films of 2026 =

The following is a list of mainland Chinese films first released in year 2026.

== Box office ==
The highest-grossing Chinese films released in 2026, by domestic box office gross revenue, are as follows:

† Indicates films currently in theatrical release.

Rank	Title	Domestic gross
1	Pegasus 3	CN¥4.42 billion
2	Once Upon a Time in the Middle East †	CN¥2.41 billion
3	Kung Fu Soccer	CN¥2.34 billion
4	All Wishes Come True!	CN¥2.06 billion
5	Dear You	CN¥2.00 billion
6	Blades of the Guardians	CN¥1.45 billion
7	Scare Out	CN¥1.37 billion
8	Boonie Bears: The Hidden Protector	CN¥1.07 billion
9	Traces of Justice †	CN¥745 million
10	V	CN¥669 million

== Released ==
=== January–March ===
Opening		Title	Director(s)	Cast	Genre	Ref.
J A N U A R Y	1	Unexpected Family	Taiyan Li	Jackie Chan, Peng Yuchang, Zhang Jianing, Pan Binlong, Li Ping	Comedy	
J A N U A R Y	17	My Friend An Delie	Dong Zijian	Liu Haoran, Dong Zijian	Drama	
J A N U A R Y	17	Take Off	Peng Fei	Jiang Qiming, Li Xueqin, Dong Bao Shi, Jiang Wu, Yang Le, Jiang Yi, Lei Jiayin, Dong Zijian, Wang Yanlin	Comedy	
J A N U A R Y	23	Busted Water Pipes	Zhou Difei	Eddie Peng, Ai Lun, Zhou You, Yan Peilun	Crime comedy	
J A N U A R Y	24	Cosmic Crew: Ice Planet	Liu Peng	Li Jing, Liu Rui, Jiang Yingjun	Animated	
F E B R U A R Y	17	Boonie Bears: The Hidden Protector	Huida Lin	Zhang Wei, Zhang Bingjun, Tan Xiao	Animated	
F E B R U A R Y	17	Blades of the Guardians	Yuen Woo-ping	Wu Jing, Nicholas Tse, Yu Shi, Chen Lijun, Sun Yizhou, Ci Sha, Li Yunxiao, Tony Leung Ka-fai, Zhang Jin, Kara Wai, Zhang Yi, Jet Li	Wuxia	
F E B R U A R Y	17	Pegasus 3	Han Han	Shen Teng, Yin Zheng, Huang Jingyu, Zhang Benyu, Wei Xiang, Sha Yi, Fan Chengcheng, Sun Yizhou, Duan Yihong, Zhang Xincheng, Hu Xianxu, Aarif Rahman, Bai Yufan, Zhou Zhengjie, Zack Gao	Sports comedy	
F E B R U A R Y	17	Panda Plan: The Magical Tribe	Derek Hui	Jackie Chan, Ma Li, Qiao Shan, Yang Yu	Action comedy	
F E B R U A R Y	17	Per Aspera ad Astra	Han Yan	Dylan Wang, Victoria Song, Zu Feng, Luo Haiqiong, Duo Wang	Science fiction adventure	
F E B R U A R Y	17	Scare Out	Zhang Yimou	Jackson Yee, Zhu Yilong, Song Jia, Lei Jiayin, Yang Mi, Zhang Yi, Liu Shishi, Liu Yaowen	Spy thriller	

=== April–June ===
Opening		Title	Director(s)	Cast	Genre	Ref.
A P R I L	3	It's OK	Yang Lina	Wen Qi, Qin Hailu	Comedy	
A P R I L	3	Now I Met Her	Xiao Luxi	Ma Sichun, Bai Ke, Justin Huang, Sunny Sun, Connor Leong	Comedy	
A P R I L	4	Game of Identity	Cheng Liang	Peng Yuchang, Ding Yuxi	Thriller	
A P R I L	28	A Story About Fire	Li Wenyu	Yang Haoyu, Zhou Xun, Bei Yile, Kang Chunlei	Animated	
A P R I L	30	Dear You	Lan Hongchun	Li Sitong, Wang Yantong, Wu Shaoqing, Zheng Runqi, Wang Xiaohui, Usha Seamkhum	Family drama	
M A Y	1	Being Towards Death	Chen Sicheng	Jiang Long, Qi Xi, Yang Chaoyue, Wang Zichuan, Zhang Chi, Cao Bingkun, Huang Yi, Ye Quanxi	Comedy	
M A Y	1	Vanishing Point	Cheng Wei-hao	Zheng Kai, Liu Haocun, Roy Chiu, Li Chen, Jiang Yan	Crime	
M A Y	1	GG Bond: Race Through Time	Gu Yanmei		Animated	
M A Y	16	A Man and a Woman	Guan Hu	Huang Bo, Ni Ni	Drama	
M A Y	22	Crossing A Dawn	Zhao Badou	Ma Sichun, Edward Chen	Romantic comedy	
M A Y	23	All The Good Eyes	Zhi Zheng	Yu Hewei, Gao Yuanyuan, Han Geng, Zhang Tian'ai, Qiao Shan, Xia Zhiguang	Crime	
J U N E	19	I Know Who You Are	Feng Xiaogang	Lei Jiayin, Hu Ge	Drama	
J U N E	19	Invictus	Piao Songri	Wang Anyu, Wang Yuwen	Romantic crime	
J U N E	26	Crossing	Xu Zhanxiong	Liu Ye, Wang Lei, Yu Shi, Wang Zhifei, Wang Yaoqing	War	
J U N E	30	It's My Time	Bai Xue	Michelle Yeoh, Liu Haoran, Sa Rina, Bai Ke, Han Tongsheng, Qi Xi, Liu Yang	Sports drama	

=== July–September ===
Opening		Title	Director(s)	Cast	Genre	Ref.
J U L Y	3	Keep Real	Xing Wenxiong	Bai Jingting, Wei Xiang	Comedy	
J U L Y	11	Kung Fu Soccer	Stephen Chow	Zhang Xiaofei, Dilraba Dilmurat, Lay Zhang	Sports comedy	
J U L Y	17	A Part of Me	Ma Yingxin	Zhang Ruonan, Jolin Jin	Drama	
J U L Y	18	All Wishes Come True!	Mu Zhengyang	Li Shaozhe, Chen Hao, Lidong, Guozi Gege, Dong Tianyi, Yu Pengli	Fantasy adventure	
J U L Y	25	The Decisive Moment	Disha Zhang	Huang Bo, Leo Wu, Gao Ye, Sunny Sun	Science fiction	
A U G U S T	1	Make Zhonghe Great Again	Dong Runnian	Zhang Ruoyun, Bai Ke, Gao Ye	Comedy	
A U G U S T	5	Niu Lai	Xin Yumeng	Xin Yumeng, Sun Lifang	Animated	
A U G U S T	6	Demon Agent	Cheng Teng	Lei Songran, Zhang Cheng, Cai Haiting, Zhang Zhe, Kai Wang, Fan Zhechen	Animated	
A U G U S T	7	To Your Island	Zhou Haoran		Animated	
A U G U S T	11	Once Upon a Time in the Middle East	Wen Muye	Shen Teng, Jiang Qiming, Aarif Rahman	Comedy	
A U G U S T	19	V	Han Yan	Zhu Yilong, Tan Jianci, Tony Leung Ka-fai, Michelle Wai, Kara Wai	Crime	

=== October–December ===
Opening		Title	Director(s)	Cast	Genre	Ref.
O C T O B E R	1	Mr. & Mrs. Pardon	Shen Chunyang	Xiaoshenyang, Shen Chunyang, Jia Bing, Yu Yang	Comedy	
O C T O B E R	1	Peppa Pig: Perfect Holiday	Liu Yuan	Chen Yiwen, Fu Chong, Churong Fan, Zhang Anqi, Jia Qiu, Sun Chang, Sun Ye, Xiangtong Wu, Liu Yao, Wang Xiaotong, Ke Zhong, Han Jiaojiao, Jing Chen, Lin Min, Lizhen Yan	Animated	
O C T O B E R	1	Traces of Justice	Chen Sicheng	Zhang Yi, Ma Li, Chen Minghao	Detective thriller	
O C T O B E R	1	New Happy Dad and Son 7 & Magical Eye Animated Movie: The Chaotic 7th Day	Lu Yu, Wang Xingfeng		Animated	
O C T O B E R	3	Go for Broke 2	Marc Ma	Isabella Leong, Wen Junhui, Bai Ke, Sammo Hung	Crime	
O C T O B E R	23	Sanxingdui: Future Past	Yueming		Animated	
O C T O B E R	23	The Elephant Odyssey	Gu Yujin		Documentary	
N O V E M B E R	6	Everest: The Other Side	Elizabeth Chai Vasarhelyi, Jimmy Chin	Jim Morrison, Hilaree Nelson	Documentary	
N O V E M B E R	7	The Embers	Aoqian Sun	Song Jia, Vicky Chen, Zu Feng	Drama	
N O V E M B E R	7	The Coffin Swap	He Nian	Jiang Wu, Du Guangyi, Gu Xin, Fan Yilin, Lei Jiayin, Yang Haoyu, Zhang Duo, Yang Rong, Sarina	Crime	
N O V E M B E R	7	Go Back to the South	Xu Xiaohui		Documentary	
N O V E M B E R	14	Probation	Zong Haiying	Tong Liya, Wang Hao, Wang Zhi, Wu You, Wang Likun	Drama	
N O V E M B E R	21	Love Test	Hou Xiaoyao	Feng Shaofeng, Chen Yusi, Li Meng, Che Xiao, Zhou Yemang	Thriller	
N O V E M B E R	25	The Sound of Malan Flowers Blooming	Xiao Jing	Ni Dahong, Huang Mengying	Drama	
N O V E M B E R	27	Lucky to Meet You	Han Zhi	Van Fan, Qu Jingjing, Li Naiwen, E Jingwen, Li Qinqin, Ma Jingwu, Cheng Taishen, Zhang Waner	Road comedy	
N O V E M B E R	27	Cyblock	Zheng Lei	Deng Jiajia, Li Mufeng, Lan Xiya, Joe Ma	Drama	
D E C E M B E R	12	Hidden Love	Zhang Yudi	Zhu Luoning, Zhou Haoqi, Xia Haoran	Romance	
D E C E M B E R	31	Operation Spike	Nie Xiefang	Yang Shengye, Guo Nier, Ke Guoqing	War	
D E C E M B E R	31	Live Long	Tony Chan	Zhang Yifan, Chen Linong, Lin Yongjian, Guo Keyu, Tang Jiuzhou, Feng Shaofeng, Sun Yizhou	Romance	

== Other films set to premiere in 2026 ==
Title	Director(s)	Cast	Genre	Ref.
The Belief	Soi Cheang	Wang Xueqi, Du Jiang, Jackson Yee, Hou Wenyuan, Luo Yizhou, Geng Le, Song Yang, Zhao Liying	War	
Light Pillar	Zao Xu	Dong Chengpeng, Qing Yi	Animated	
Kūkai	Ye Yue		Biographical docudrama	
Angel in White	Herman Yau	Andy Lau, Yang Zishan	Drama	
