= 25th New York Asian Film Festival =

2026 Asian film festival in New York

- Official poster
- Opening film: Colony
- Closing film: Dear You by Lan Hongchun
- Location: Film at Lincoln Center, New York
- Founded: 2002
- Awards: Uncaged Award: Fujiko; Audience Award: My Name; Extraordinary Star Asia Award:Jun Ji-hyun; Rising Star Asia Award: Angela Yuen; Sara Minami
- Hosted by: New York Asian Film Foundation Inc.
- Artistic director: Samuel Jamier
- No. of films: 100+ films
- Festival date: Opening: 10 July 2026; Closing: 26 July 2026
- Language: International
- Website: NYAFF

New York Asian Film Festival
- 26th 24th

The 25th New York Asian Film Festival opened on 10 July 2026 in New York City, launching its 25th anniversary edition with South Korean film Colony by Yeon Sang-ho. The festival presented 69 feature films, 26 short films, 49 screenings at Film at Lincoln Center screened in person, featuring a diverse selection of both contemporary works and classic titles from across Asia and beyond. This year’s edition spotlight was on Vietnam, alongside returning sidebar programs including Queer Unbound, Horrorscope, and the popular Secret Screening at Anthology Film Archives.

The festival closed on July 26, 2026 with Dear You, a Chinese family drama film directed by Lan Hongchun. Japanese drama film Fujiko by Kimura Taichi, which follows a single mother in 1970s and ‘80s Japan as she refuses to surrender to societal pressures, won the Uncaged Award for best feature film.

== Jury ==
=== Uncaged award ===
Jury for Uncaged award is composed of:

- Cindy Cheung: Chinese American actress
- Bao Nguyen: American film director, cinematographer and producer
- Diane Paragas: Filipino-American documentary and narrative film and commercial director
- Dan Truong: Cinereach executive

=== Shorts jury ===
- Johnson Cheng: Chinese American writer and director
- Ida Del Mundo: filmmaker, writer, teacher, and musician
- Jun Li: Hong Kong filmmaker and critic

== Opening weekend gala ==
The weekend gala celebrating the 25th anniversary edition of the festival opened with South Korean action horror film Colony by Yeon Sang-ho. The director and the star of the film Jun Ji-hyun attended the gala in person. On July 11, she was honored with the Extraordinary Star Asia Award, the highest honor in the festival for her contribution to the development of Asian cinema and outstanding performances on the international stage.

== Screening venues ==
Five New York venues screened the films during the run of festival.

- Film at Lincoln Center
- SVA Theatre
- IFC Center
- Anthology Film Archives
- Korean Cultural Center New York

== Films showcase ==
| Year | Title | Original Title | Country | Director | Premiere Status |
Opening film
| 2026 | Colony | 군체 | South Korea | Yeon Sang-ho | North American Premiere |
Beyond Borders
| 2025 | River Tales | নৈ কথা | India | Dr. Pankaj Borah | International Premiere |
| 2026 | Turgaud | Тургауд | Kazakhstan | Adilkhan Yerzhanov | North American Premiere |
Centerpiece Presentation
| 2026 | Hope | 호프 | South Korea | Na Hong-jin | North American Premiere |
Closing film
| 2026 | Dear You | 给阿嬷的情书 | China | Lan Hongchun | North American Premiere |
China Currents
| 2026 | Crossing A Dawn | 今晚正好 | China | Zhao Badou | New York Premiere |
| 2026 | Take Off | 飞行家 | China | Pengfei | North American Premiere |
Country In Focus: Vietnam
| 2025 | Ky Nam Inn | Quán Kỳ Nam | Vietnam | Leon Le | New York Premiere |
| 2026 | Mr. Hero | Anh Hùng | Vietnam | Vo Thach Thao | International Premiere |
Diasporic Discoveries
| 2026 | BTS: The Return | | United States, South Korea | Bao Nguyen | Special Screening |
| 2025 | Jet Lag in Summer | 八九点钟 | Hong Kong, United States | Yan Kunao | US Premiere |
| 2025 | Montréal, ma belle | Montréal, ma belle | Canada | Xiaodan He | New York Premiere |
| 2016 | Spa Night | | United States | Andrew Ahn | Special Screening |
Filmmaker in Focus: Andrew Lau
| 2025 | The Dumpling Queen | 水餃皇后 | Hong Kong | Andrew Lau | Special Screening |
| 2005 | Initial D (20th Anniversary 4K Version) | 頭文字D | Hong Kong | Andrew Lau, Alan Mak | Special Screening |
| 1998 | The Storm Riders | 風雲雄霸天下 | Hong Kong | Andrew Lau | Special Screening |
Horrorscope
| 2000 | Battle Royale | バトル・ロワイアル | Japan | Kinji Fukasaku | Special Screening |
| 2026 | Colony | 군체 | South Korea | Yeon Sang-ho | North American Premiere |
| 2020 | Peninsula | 반도 | South Korea | Yeon Sang-ho | Special Screening |
| 2016 | Seoul Station | 서울역 | South Korea | Yeon Sang-ho | Special Screening |
| 2016 | Train to Busan | 부산행 | South Korea | Yeon Sang-ho | Special Screening |
| 2025 | The Undertaker 2 : World After Death | สัปเหร่อ 2 | Thailand | Thiti Srinuan | North American Premiere |
NYAFF 25th Anniversary Rediscoveries
| 2000 | Battle Royale | バトル・ロワイアル | Japan | Kinji Fukasaku | Special Screening |
| 2002 | Fat Choi Spirit | 嚦咕嚦咕新年 | Hong Kong | Johnnie To and Wai Ka-fai | Special Screening |
| 2001 | Ichi The Killer | 殺し屋１ | Japan | Takashi Miike | Special Screening |
| 2001 | Monrak Transistor | มนต์รักทรานซิสเตอร์ | Thailand | Pen-ek Ratanaruang | Special Screening |
| 2001 | Shaolin Soccer | 少林足球 | Hong Kong | Stephen Chow | Special Screening |
| 2001 | You Shoot, I Shoot | 買兇拍人 | Hong Kong | Pang Ho-cheung | Special Screening |
Prime Picks
| 2026 | Cold War 1994 | 寒戰1994 | Hong Kong | Longman Leung | Special Screening |
| 2026 | The King's Warden | 왕과 사는 남자 | South Korea | Jang Hang-jun | Special Screening |
Queer Unbound
| 2025 | Girlfriends | 女孩不平凡 | Macau, Taiwan, Hong Kong, Thailand | Tracy Choi | North American Premiere |
| 2026 | We’re Nothing at All | 我們不是什麼 | Hong Kong | Herman Yau | U.S. Premiere |
Spotlight On Na Hong-jin
| 2008 | The Chaser | 추격자 | South Korea | Na Hong-jin | Special Screening |
| 2026 | Hope | 호프 | South Korea | Na Hong-jin | North American Premiere |
| 2016 | The Wailing | 곡성 | South Korea | Na Hong-jin | Special Screening |
| 2010 | The Yellow Sea | 황해 | South Korea | Na Hong-jin | Special Screening |
Yeon Sang-ho: Apocalypse Architect
| 2026 | Colony | 군체 | South Korea | Yeon Sang-ho | North American Premiere |
| 2020 | Peninsula | 반도 | South Korea | Yeon Sang-ho | Special Screening |
| 2016 | Seoul Station | 서울역 | South Korea | Yeon Sang-ho | Special Screening |
| 2016 | Train to Busan | 부산행 | South Korea | Yeon Sang-ho | Special Screening |

== Films by country or region ==
| Year | Title | Original Title | Director | Premiere status |
Hong Kong Panorama
| 2026 | Afterpiece | 第四幕 | Keane T. K. Wong | North American Premiere |
| 2026 | Bird of Paradise | 媽樣年華 | Joey Wu | International Premiere |
| 2026 | Cold War 1994 | 寒戰1994 | Longman Leung | Special Screening |
| 2026 | Cyclone | 超風 | Philip Yung | North American Premiere |
| 2026 | The Dating Menu | 廚師發辦 | Amos Why, Frankie Chung | International Premiere |
| 2026 | Dog Day Evening | 一個部門的誕生 | Mak Tin Shu | North American Premiere |
| 2025 | The Dumpling Queen | 水餃皇后 | Andrew Lau | Special Screening |
| 2002 | Fat Choi Spirit | 嚦咕嚦咕新年 | Johnnie To and Wai Ka-fai | Special Screening |
| 2025 | Gamer Girls | 電競女孩 | Veronica Bassetto, Sophie Yang | North American Premiere |
| 2026 | Night King | 夜王 | Jack Ng | International Premiere |
| 2025 | Unidentified Murder | UFO離奇命案 | Kwok Ka Hei, Jack Lee Chun | U.S. Premiere |
Japan Perspectives
| 2026 | All Greens | 万事快調 オール・グリーンズ | Takashi Koyama | North American Premiere |
| 2000 | Battle Royale | バトル・ロワイアル | Kinji Fukasaku | Special Screening |
| 2026 | The Brightest Sun | 時には懺悔を | Tetsuya Nakashima | North American Premiere |
| 2026 | Fujiko | | Taichi Kimura | North American Premiere |
| 2025 | Higuma!! The Killer Bear | ヒグマ!! | Eisuke Naito | North American Premiere |
| 2001 | Ichi The Killer | 殺し屋１ | Takashi Miike | Special Screening |
| 2026 | Kinki | 近畿地方のある場所について | Kōji Shiraishi | North American Premiere |
| 2026 | Magical Secret Tour | マジカル・シークレット・ツアー | Chihiro Amano | International Premiere |
| 2026 | Samurai Vengeance | 木挽町のあだ討ち | Takashi Minamoto | International Premiere |
| 2026 | Street Kingdom | ストリート・キングダム 自分の音を鳴らせ | Tomorowo Taguchi | North American Premiere |
| 2025 | Unchained | 四月の余白 | Keisuke Yoshida | North American Premiere |
Korean Horizons
| 2025 | 3670 | | Park Joon-ho | New York Premiere |
| 2008 | The Chaser | 추격자 | Na Hong-jin | Special Screening |
| 2026 | Colony | 군체 | Yeon Sang-ho | North American Premiere |
| 2026 | Frosted Window | 동화지만 청불입니다 | Kim Jong-kwan | North American Premiere |
| 2025 | Funky Freaky Freaks | 충충충 | Han Chang-lok | North American Premiere |
| 2025 | Hallan | 한란 | Ha Myung-mi | North American Premiere |
| 2025 | Journey There | 흐르는 여정 | Kim Jin-yu | North American Premiere |
| 2026 | The King's Warden | 왕과 사는 남자 | Jang Hang-jun | Special Screening |
| 2026 | Lovely Death | 사랑하는 죽음 | Lee Won-suk | International Premiere |
| 2026 | My Name | 내 이름은 | Chung Ji-young | North American Premiere |
| 2001 | My Sassy Girl (4K Restoration) | 엽기적인 그녀 | Kwak Jae-yong | North American Premiere |
| 2020 | Peninsula | 반도 | Yeon Sang-ho | Special Screening |
| 2016 | Seoul Station | 서울역 | Yeon Sang-ho | Special Screening |
| 2016 | Train to Busan | 부산행 | Yeon Sang-ho | Special Screening |
| 2016 | The Wailing | 곡성 | Na Hong-jin | Special Screening |
| 2010 | The Yellow Sea | 황해 | Na Hong-jin | Special Screening |
Taiwan Uncut
| 2025 | A Dance With Rainbows | 恨女的逆襲 | Lee Yi-shan | North American Premiere |
| 2025 | Deep Quiet Room | 深度安靜 | Shen Ko-Shang | North American Premiere |
| 2006 | Eternal Summer (4K Restoration) | 盛夏光年 | Leste Chen | Special Screening |
| 2026 | I Blew Out The Candles Before Making A Wish | 我未許願先吹蠟燭 | Chao Koi Wang, Hu Chin-Yen | North American Premiere |
| 2026 | Kiss Me My Ghost Friend | 啵me之我的青春住了鬼 | Chen Ta-pu | North American Premiere |
| 2026 | Kung Fu | 功夫 | Giddens Ko | U.S. Premiere |
| 2025 | Last Night in Taipei | 明日的過客 | Kuo Cheng-chui | U.S. Premiere |
Thai Visions
| 2025 | 4 Tigers | เสือ | Kongkiat Komesiri | North American Premiere |
| 2026 | Gohan | โกฮัง หัวใจโกโฮม | Chayanop Boonprakob, Nattawut Poonpiriya, Atta Hemwadee | North American Premiere |
| 2025 | Human Resource | พนักงานใหม่ (โปรดรับไว้พิจารณา | Nawapol Thamrongrattanarit | New York Premiere |
| 2001 | Monrak Transistor | มนต์รักทรานซิสเตอร์ | Pen-ek Ratanaruang | Special Screening |
| 2026 | Someone Special | คนพิเศษ | Petong Sakulchai, Ariel Feng | World Premiere |
| 2025 | Tha Rae: The Exorcist | ท่าแร่ | Taweewat Wantha | North American Premiere |
| 2025 | The Undertaker 2 : World After Death | สัปเหร่อ 2 | Thiti Srinuan | North American Premiere |

=== Southeast Asian Frontiers ===
| Year | Title | Original Title | Country | Director | Premiere status |
Southeast Asian Frontiers
| 2025 | 10s Across the Borders | | Philippines, Singapore, Germany | Chan Sze-Wei | New York Premiere |
| 2026 | Filipiñana | | Singapore, United Kingdom, Philippines, France, Netherlands | Rafael Manuel | New York Premiere |
| 2025 | Ky Nam Inn | Quán Kỳ Nam | Vietnam | Leon Le | New York Premiere |
| 2025 | Manila's Finest | | Philippines | Raymond Red | International Premiere |
| 2026 | Mr. Hero | Anh Hùng | Vietnam | Vo Thach Thao | International Premiere |
| 2026 | Sleep No More | Monster Pabrik Rambut | Indonesia, Japan, Singapore, Germany | Edwin | U.S. Premiere |

== Uncaged Competition – For Best Feature Film ==
Eight films will compete for Uncaged award.

| Year | Title | Original Title | Country | Director | Premiere Status |
The Uncaged Award nominees
| 2025 | A Dance With Rainbows | 恨女的逆襲 | Taiwan | Lee Yi-shan | North American Premiere |
| 2025 | Deep Quiet Room | 深度安靜 | Taiwan, Italy | Shen Ko-Shang | North American Premiere |
| 2026 | Dog Day Evening | 一個部門的誕生 | Hong Kong | Mak Tin Shu | North American Premiere |
| 2026 | Fujiko | | Japan | Taichi Kimura | North American Premiere |
| 2025 | Girlfriends | 女孩不平凡 | Macau, Taiwan, Hong Kong, Thailand | Tracy Choi | North American Premiere |
| 2025 | Hallan | 한란 | South Korea | Ha Myung-mi | North American Premiere |
| 2026 | Turgaud | Тургауд | Kazakhstan | Adilkhan Yerzhanov | North American Premiere |
| 2026 | Wild Nights, Tamed Beasts | | China | Wang Tong | North American Premiere |

== Shorts Program ==
=== Shorts Program 1: Spirited Away ===
- Fruit (Buah) | dir. Jen Nee Lim | Singapore, Malaysia, 2025 | New York Premiere
- Still Water (Si Shui) | dir. Yijian Shan | China, Japan, United States, 2025 | U.S. Premiere
- Flamingo in the Garden | dir. Xinhui Ma | United States, 2025 | New York Premiere
- Agapito | dir. Arvin Belarmino, Kyla Romero | Philippines, 2025 | New York Premiere
- A Dream Like a Dream | dir. Linjie Sheng | China, 2026, China | North American Premiere
- Cookie, Love | dir. Sari Arambulo | United States, France, 2025
- Cecilia Is Only Eight Years Old | dir. Soojeong Son | United States, 2026 | World Premiere

=== Shorts Program 2: Lost & Found ===
- Apes | dir. Benny Wang | China, 2026 | North American Premiere
- Paper Daughter | dir. Cami Kwan | United States, 2025 | New York Premiere
- Girl Talk | dir. Yating Hsu | Taiwan, 2026 | World Premiere
- Buddha the Betrayer | dir. Ning Qian | China, Taiwan, 2025 | International Premiere
- Where Belly Goes | dir. Daphne Zelle | United States, 2025 | World Premiere
- One Last Walk | dir. Diana Bang, Andrea Bang | Canada, 2025 | International Premiere
- Autosave | dir. Imanuel Bolaman | Indonesia, 2025 | World Premiere

=== Shorts Program 3: Pressure Points ===
- Hyena | dir. Altay Ulan Yang | China, United States, 2025 | New York Premiere
- Our Child | dir. Anatole Sloan | Hong Kong, United Kingdom, 2026 | World Premiere
- No Place Like Home | dir. Shen Chieh Tsang | Taiwan, 2025 | North American Premiere
- Correct Me If I’m Wrong | dir. Hao Zhou | Germany, United States, 2025 | New York Premiere
- Coffin Therapy | dir. Zéré Turlykhanova | Kazakhstan, 2025 | New York Premiere
- The Housekeeper | dir. Surya Balakrishnan | India, 2025 | New York Premiere

=== Shorts Program 4: Korean Shorts ===
- Let The Neon Lights Dance | dir. Suzanne Soo Hyun Kim | Australia, South Korea, 2024 | World Premiere
- Undercurrent | dir. Ru-ri Lee | South Korea, 2025 | North American Premiere
- The Newcomer | dir. Annette Cho | United States, 2025
- SPEEDY! | dir. Jiin Oh | United States, 2025 | New York Premiere
- Devils in the Bush| dir. Juliet Belisario | Canada, 2025 | U.S. Premiere
- Broken Dawn | dir. Hao-Oh Park | South Korea, 2025 | New York Premiere

== Awards and winners ==
Japanese drama film Fujiko by Kimura Taichi, which follows a single mother in 1970s and ‘80s Japan as she refuses to surrender to societal pressures, and South Korea's drama film My Name by Chung Ji-young, that follows a teenage boy who is bullied for his feminine name while his mother deals with the traumatic memories of the Jeju Uprising of April 3, 1948, won the main awards.

=== Uncaged Award for Best Feature Film ===
- Fujiko by Kimura Taichi, Japan
- Special Jury Mention:
  - Turgaud by Adilkhan Yerzhanov, Kazakhstan

=== Audience Award ===
- My Name by Adam Wong, South Korea

=== Shorts Program Awards ===
This year’s Shorts Program jury awarded Best Short Film and 2 Special Jury Mentions:

- Best Short Film
  - Correct Me If I’m Wrong by Hao Zhou, Germany, United States
- Special Jury Mention:
  - Paper Daughter by Cami Kwan, United States
  - Still Water by Yijian Shan, China, Japan, United States

=== Star Asia Lifetime Achievement Award ===
- Joan Chen, Chinese-born American actress and film director

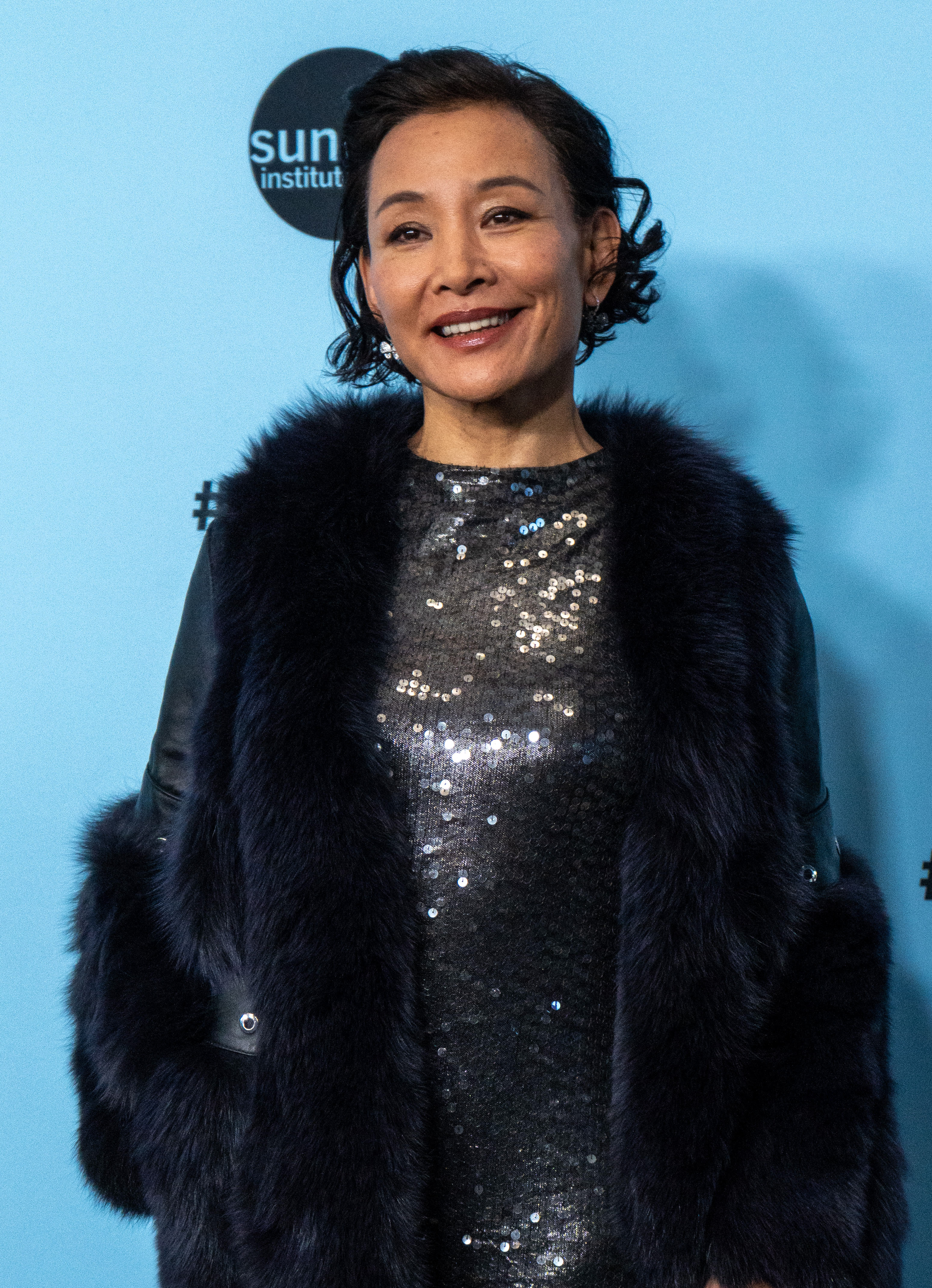
Joan Chen recipient of Star Asia Lifetime Achievement Award

=== Star Asia Awards ===
- Extraordinary Star Asia Award:
  - Jun Ji-hyun, South Korean actress and model

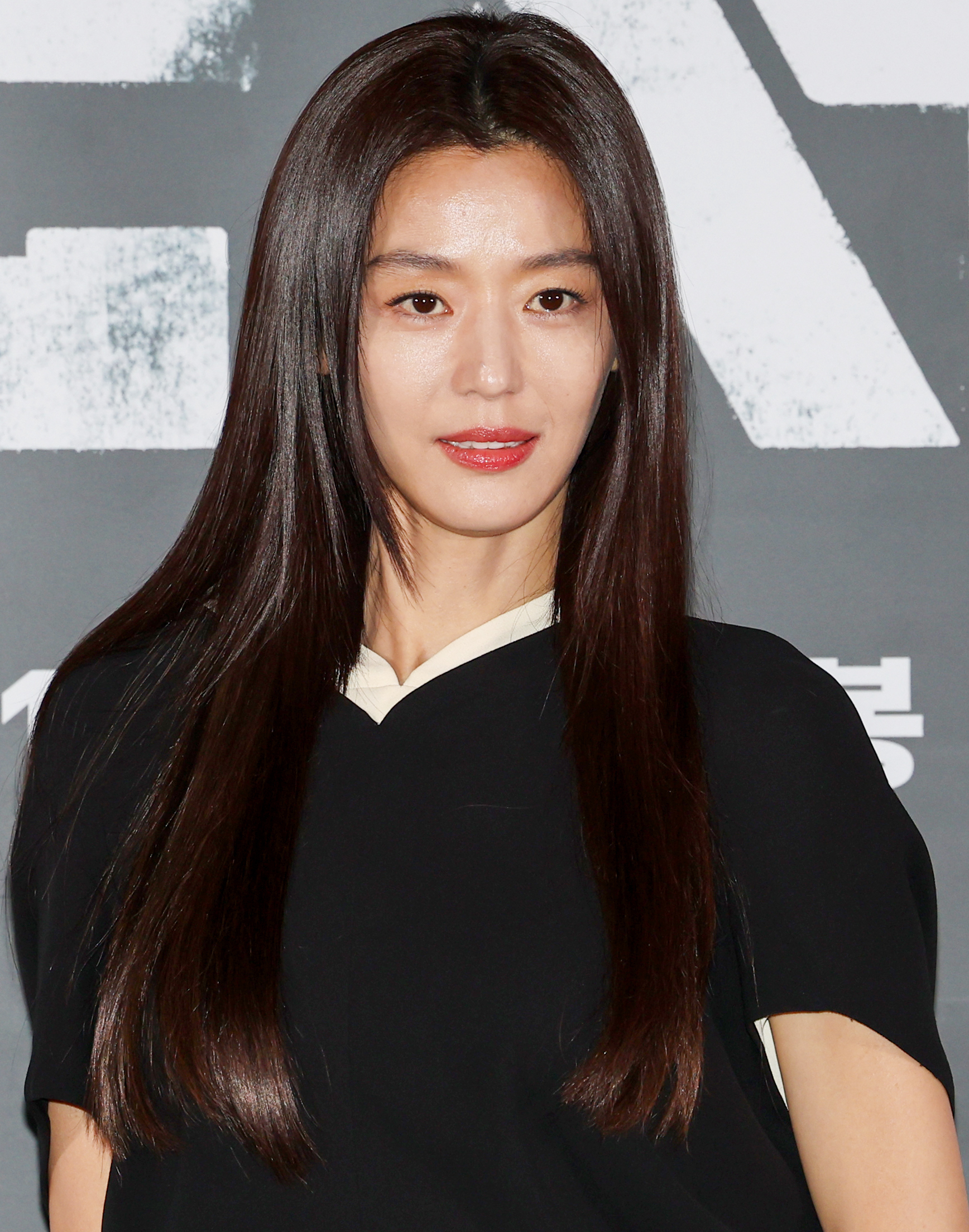
Jun Ji-hyun recipient of Extraordinary Star Asia Award

- Star Asia Award:
  - Joseph Chang, Taiwanese actor

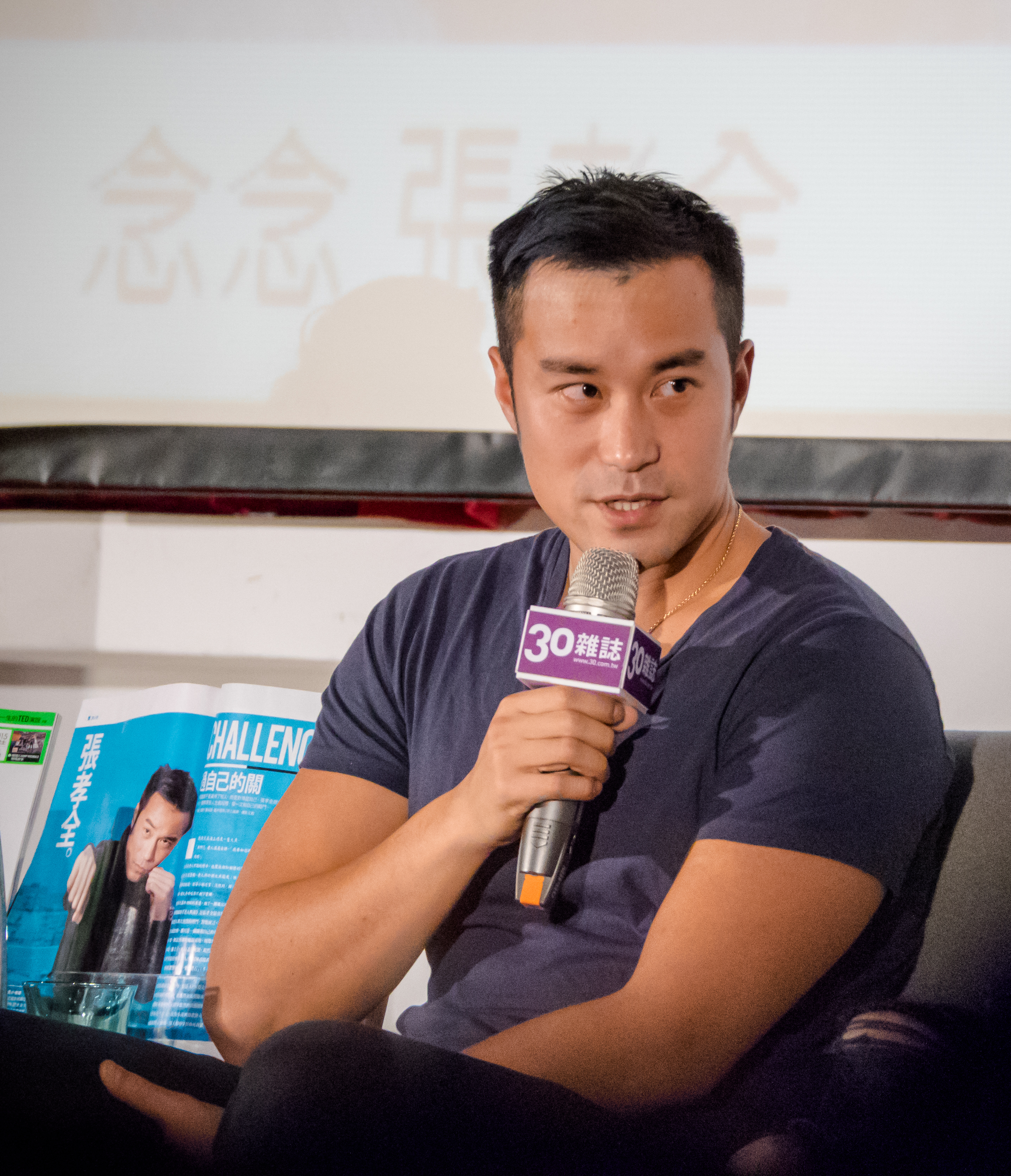
Joseph Chang recipient of Star Asia Award

- Best from the East Award:
  - Daniel Wu, Hong Kong actor, director, and producer

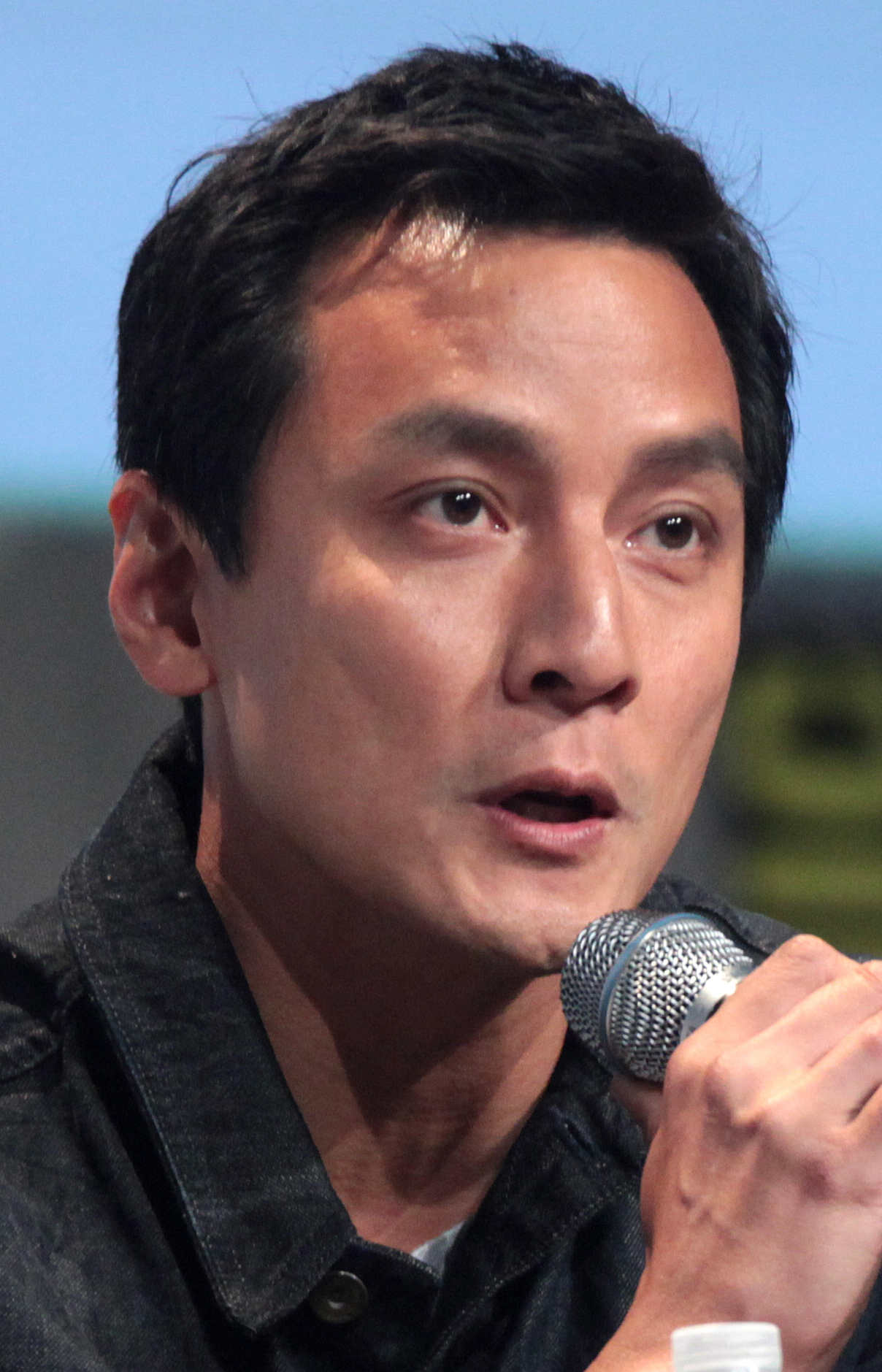
Daniel Wu recipient of Best from the East Award

- Rising Star Asia Award:

Two of Asian cinema’s "fastest-rising actors", Hong Kong’s Angela Yuen and Japanese actress Sara Minami were the recipient of the awards.

  - Angela Yuen, Hong Kong fashion model and actress

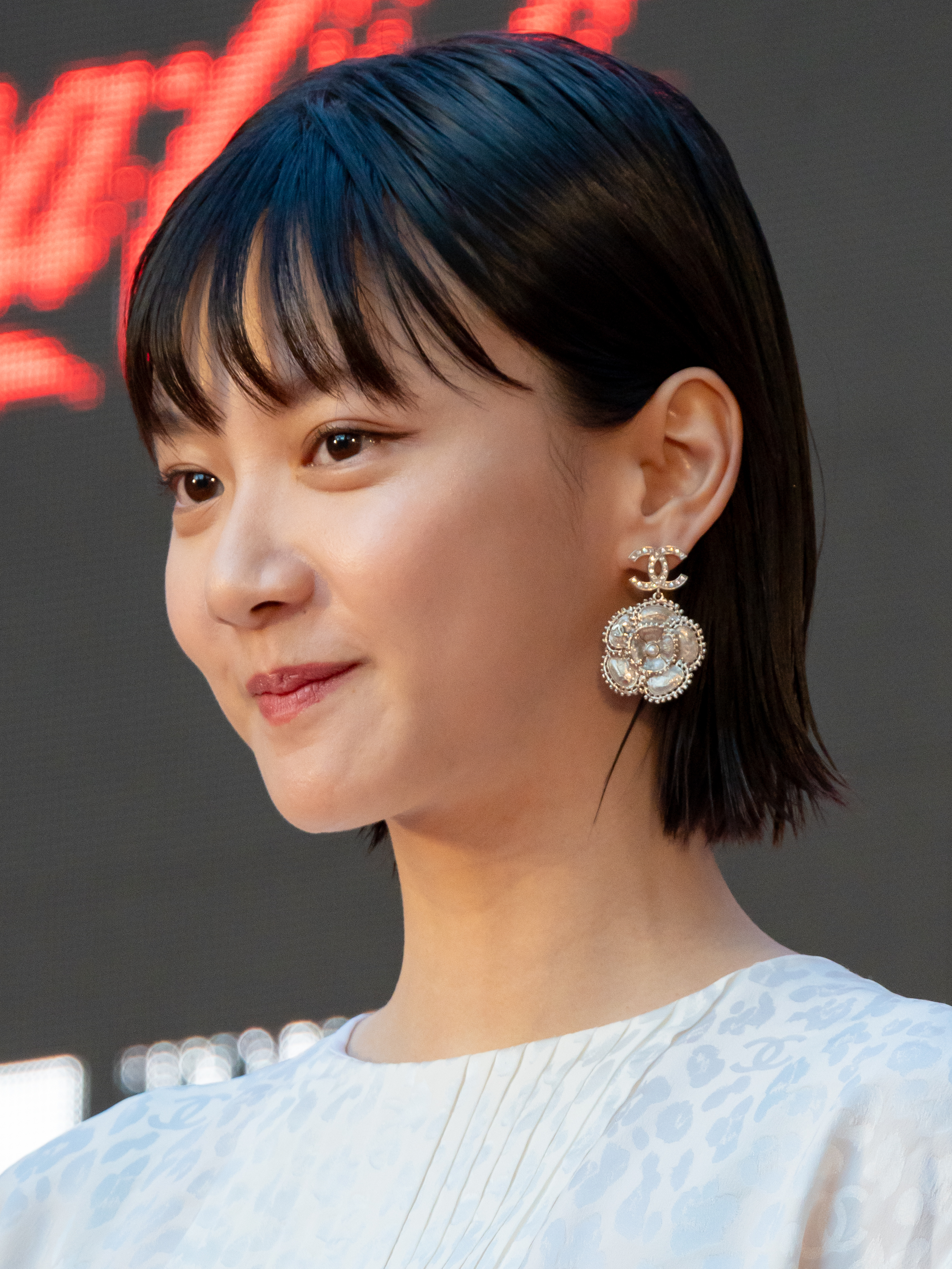
Angela Yuen co-recipient of Rising Star Asia Award

  - Sara Minami, Japanese actress and model

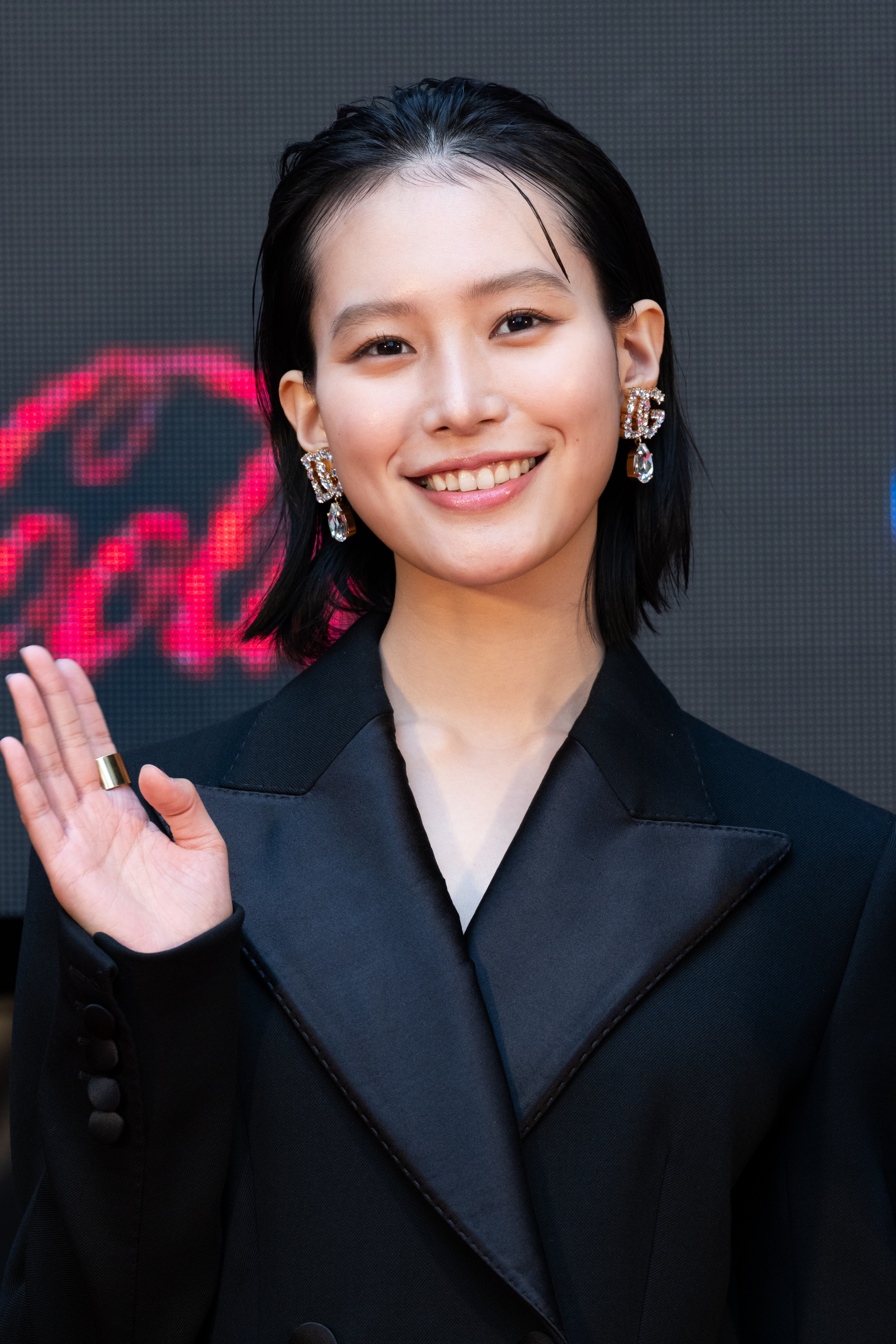
Sara Minami co-recipient of Rising Star Asia Award

=== Daniel Craft Award for Excellence in Action Cinema ===
- Yeon Sang-ho, South Korean film director and screenwriter

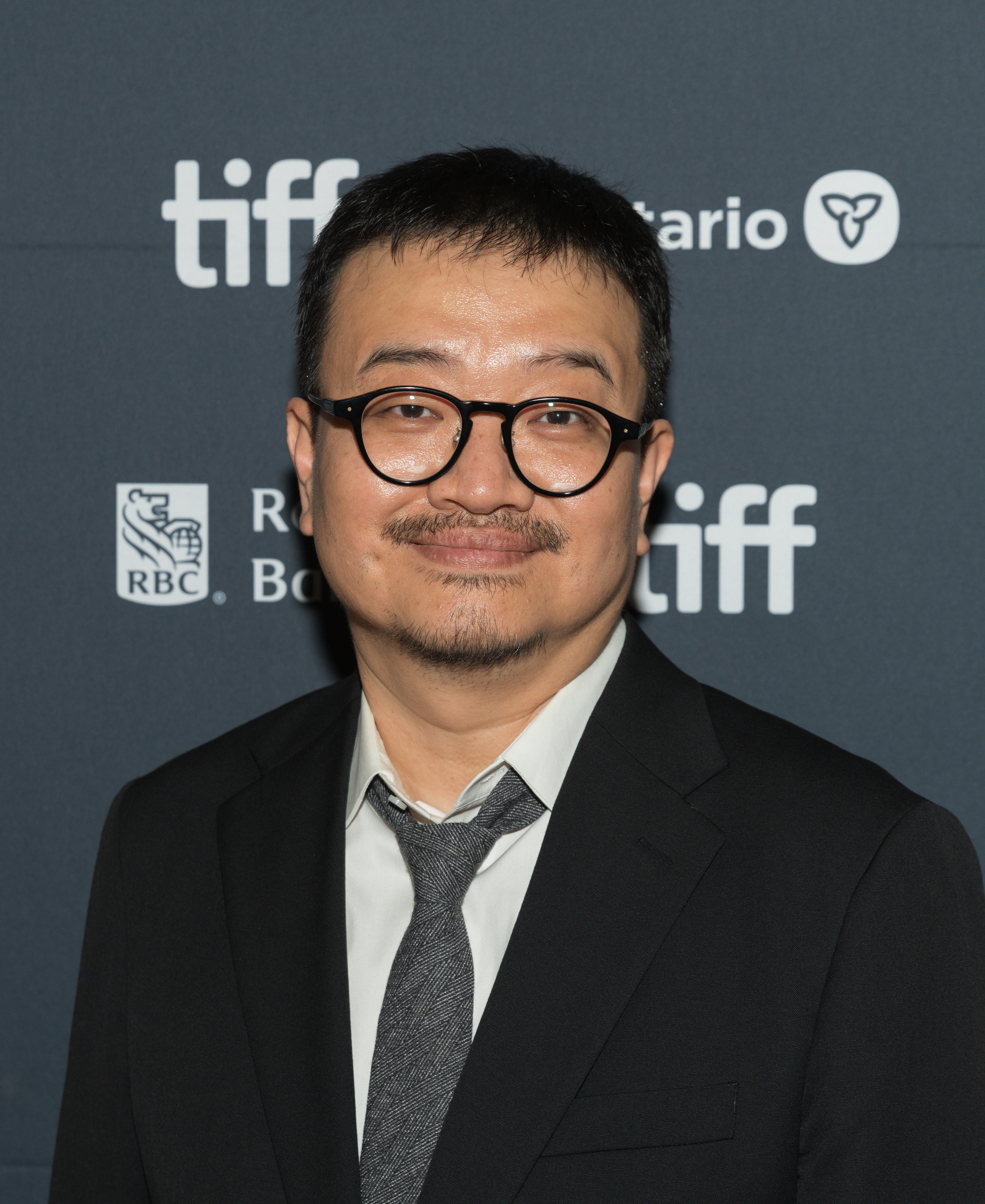
Yeon Sang-ho recipient of Daniel Craft Award for Excellence in Action Cinema
