= Invitational rhetoric =

Theory of rhetoric

Invitational rhetoric is a theory of rhetoric developed by Sonja K. Foss and Cindy L. Griffin in 1995.

Invitational rhetoric is defined as “an invitation to understanding as a means to create a relationship rooted in equality, immanent value, and self-determination.” The theory challenges the traditional definition of rhetoric as persuasion—the effort to change others—because the objective of invitational rhetoric is not to persuade but to gain an understanding of the perspectives of others.

Invitational rhetoric is part of an effort to formulate alternative conceptions of rhetoric that are not “exploitative and oppressive but that contribute to a more respectful way of being a rhetor in the world.” A major assumption behind invitational rhetoric is that “the communication discipline, through its traditional constructs and theories, participates in this culture of domination,” and invitational rhetoric constitutes an effort to “contribute to the creation of more humane lives” for individuals.

== Core elements ==
Invitational rhetoric is rooted in three feminist principles that “explicitly challenge the positive value the patriarchy accords to changing and thus dominating others”—equality, immanent value, and self-determination.

- Equality: In contrast to the traditional rhetoric of persuasion, in which the rhetor is seen as superior to the audience, the rhetor and the audience are viewed as equal peers who share authority and expertise and contribute equally to an interaction.
- Immanent value: Immanent value means that all individuals have unique, unrepeatable perspectives that should be appreciated for what they contribute to an interaction.
- Self-determination: Self-determination is the principle that others are competent individuals who should be allowed to make their own decisions about their lives. Although change is not the objective of invitational rhetoric, change may occur as a result of an invitational interaction. Interacting with others inevitably produces changes of various kinds in interactants, but in the case of invitational rhetoric, both the rhetor and the audience may choose to change their perspectives as a result of the process of sharing perspectives. They do not, however, enter the interaction trying to impose their perspectives on and trying to change one another.

Participants in invitational rhetoric value diverse perspectives because they recognize that every perspective is partial; as a result, they seek multiple perspectives to gain a more comprehensive understanding of an issue or situation. Invitational rhetors are particularly interested in exploring perspectives that are different from their own because they provide them with new information that enlarges their understanding. Because they are eager to engage different perspectives and to allow them to affect their own thinking, invitational participants enter an interaction willing to call into question their own perspectives.

In contrast to persuasive rhetoric, which involves power-over and an attempt to establish power over others by changing them, in invitational rhetoric, the kind of power involved is power-with. This type of power is shared among the audience members and the rhetor and is used by all participants together to come to an understanding, to make a decision, or to solve a problem.

Invitational rhetoric is one of many useful rhetorical options; it is not designed to be used in all situations. It is one of five modes of rhetoric available to rhetors:

- In conquest rhetoric, rhetors try to establish their idea as the best among competing positions.
- Conversion rhetoric is rhetoric that is designed to change the minds or behaviors of others by convincing them that another way is superior.
- In benevolent rhetoric, the objective is to help individuals improve their lives and often involves providing useful information to others.
- Advisory rhetoric is designed to provide assistance requested by others; it is a response to an implicit or explicit request for information or advice.

== Rhetorical options in invitational rhetoric ==
There are two primary rhetorical options in invitational rhetoric: (1) offering perspectives; and (2) creating external conditions that encourage audience members to share their perspectives with the rhetor.

=== Offering perspectives ===
Offering perspectives is the way by which rhetors share their perspectives with audience members, explaining what they know or understand about an issue or idea without advocating for those perspectives. Offering occurs verbally through the use of words to explain a rhetor's perspective or nonverbally through wearing particular kinds of clothing or displaying symbols that suggest an individual's identification. Wearing a charity bracelet, for example, suggests that a rhetor is identified with a certain cause or issue. Wearers of the bracelets are not attempting to persuade others to support the cause but are simply offering a perspective so that those who are curious about the bracelet can choose to explore the perspective being offered.

Offering perspectives may be difficult to do in hostile situations when other interactants are not interested in hearing a different perspective or when conquest and conversion rhetorics are being used. In such cases, invitational rhetors may use re-sourcement so that they can offer their perspectives and continue to engage in invitational rhetoric. Re-sourcement is a term coined by Sally Miller Gearhart that means drawing energy from a new source—“a source other than the individual or system that provided the initial frame for the issue.”

Re-sourcement involves two basic processes. The first is disengaging from the frame of the precipitating message—stepping away from the frame in which the message is being offered and recognizing that the response does not have to be couched in that same frame. The second process is developing a message that “does not directly argue against or even address the message being offered. It presents a response addressed to a different exigence, need, or problem from the one implicit” in the initial message. The use of re-sourcement allows rhetors to value both themselves and their audience members and provides a space for more options for interaction in the future because it has not locked participants into an adversarial framework.

An example of re-sourcement is a response suggested by Suzette Haden Elgin to instances of sexual harassment. She offers what she calls the Boring Baroque Response to unwanted sexual proposals or sexually suggestive remarks. This strategy involves responding to such messages by telling a long story with many tedious details that is unrelated to and does not address the proposition offered by the instigator of the message.

=== Creating external conditions ===
The second primary rhetorical option in invitational rhetoric is creating external conditions. This option involves creating an environment that encourages audience members to share their perspectives with the rhetor. To accomplish this objective, the invitational rhetor attempts to create three conditions—safety, value, and freedom.

- Safety: Safety is the creation of “a feeling of security and freedom from danger for the audience.” When safety is created in a rhetorical situation, audience members feel secure both physically and intellectually. They feel like they can safely share and question ideas and that the rhetor with whom they are sharing their perspectives will respect their ideas and will not degrade or belittle them.
- Value: Value is acknowledgment by the rhetor that the audience members have intrinsic worth. Rhetors show that they value audience members when they treat them as unique individuals with worthwhile perspectives. They listen carefully to and seriously consider the perspectives audience members share. As a result, they encourage audience members to contribute in significant ways to the interaction.
- Freedom: When rhetors give audience members freedom, they do not expect them to make the same choices they have made; they give them the freedom to believe and act as they themselves choose. Invitational rhetors allow any subjects to be introduced into the interaction and allow all assumptions to be questioned. Freedom also means that rhetors are not disappointed or angry if audience members choose not to adopt the perspectives they offer. The relationship between rhetor and audience will not be disrupted because of the difference in their perspectives.

== Applications ==
- Austenfeld, Anne Marie (2006). "The Revelatory Narrative Circle in Barbara Kingsolver's The Poisonwood Bible". Journal of Narrative Theory. 36 (2): 293–305. doi:10.1353/jnt.2007.0000. S2CID 161270744.
- Bates, Benjamin R (2017). "Participatory Graffiti as Invitational Rhetoric: The Case of O Machismo". Qualitative Research Reports in Communication. 18: 1–9. doi:10.1080/17459435.2017.1330276. S2CID 148855019.
- Bowers, Venessa A.; Buzzanell, Patrice M. (2002). "The Space Between: Using Peer Theater to Transcend Race, Class and Gender". Women and Language. 25: 29–40.
- Cavin, Margaret (2006). "Elise Boulding's Rhetoric: An Invitation to Peace". Peace and Change. 31 (3): 390–412. doi:10.1111/j.1468-0130.2006.00380.x.
- DeLaure, Marilyn Bordwell (2008). "Planting Seeds of Change: Ella Baker's Radical Rhetoric". Women's Studies in Communication. 31: 1–28. doi:10.1080/07491409.2008.10162520. S2CID 145561225.
- Dutta-Bergman, Mohan J (2005). "Theory and Practice in Health Communication Campaigns: A Critical Interrogation". Health Communication. 18 (2): 103–22. doi:10.1207/s15327027hc1802_1. PMID 16083406. S2CID 42214397.
- Ellingson, Laura L.; Buzzanell, Patrice M. (1999). "Listening to Women's Narratives of Breast Cancer Treatment: A Feminist Approach to Patient Satisfaction With Physician-Patient Communication". Health Communication. 11 (2): 153–83. doi:10.1207/s15327027hc1102_3. PMID 16370974.
- Ellis, Donald G (2005). "Intercultural Communication in Intractable Ethnopolitical Conflicts". International and Intercultural Communication Annual. 28: 45–69.
- Elmualim, Abbas Ali. “Culture and Leadership in Stakeholder Management.” In Construction Stakeholder Management, edited by Ezekiel Chinyio and Paul Olomolaiye, 175–90. West Sussex, UK: John Wiley, 2007.
- Hess, Aaron (2007). "In Digital Remembrance: Vernacular Memory and the Rhetorical Construction of Web Memorials". Media, Culture & Society. 29 (5): 812–30. doi:10.1177/0163443707080539. S2CID 145622599.
- McMillan, Gloria (2002). "Keeping the Conversation Going: Jane Addams' Rhetorical Strategies in 'A Modern Lear.'". Rhetoric Society Quarterly. 32 (3): 61–75. doi:10.1080/02773940209391234. S2CID 29473399.
- Pedrioli, Carlo A (2004). "A New Image in the Looking Glass: Faculty Mentoring, Invitational Rhetoric, and the Second-Class Status of Women in U. S. Academia". Hastings Women's Law Journal. 16: 185–215.
- Petre, Elizabeth A (2007). "Understanding Epideictic Purpose as Invitational Rhetoric in Women's Political Convention Speeches". Kaleidoscope. 6: 21–37.
- Riley, Jeannette E.; Torrens, Kathleen M.; Krumholz, Susan T. (2005). "Contemporary Feminist Writers: Envisioning a Just World". Contemporary Justice Review. 8: 91–106. doi:10.1080/10282580500044127. S2CID 143013973.
- Scott, David K (2003). "The Eisenhower/Khrushchev Rhetorical Compact: Toward a Model of Cooperative Public Discourse". Southern Communication Journal. 68 (4): 287–307. doi:10.1080/10417940309373268. S2CID 151775839.
- Sharf, Barbara F (1995). "Poster Art as Women's Rhetoric: Raising Awareness about Breast Cancer". Literature and Medicine. 14 (1): 72–86. doi:10.1353/lm.1995.0011. PMID 7541094. S2CID 40181496.
- Stroud, Scott R (2005). "Ontological Orientation and the Practice of Rhetoric: A Perspective from the Bhagavad Gita". Southern Communication Journal. 70 (2): 146–60. doi:10.1080/10417940509373320. S2CID 147021273.
- Taylor, Karen, Rita Durant, and David Boje. “Telling the Story, Hearing the Story: Narrative Co-Construction and Crisis Research.” American Communication Journal 9 (2007), online.
- Wei, Zhang; Kramarae, Cheris (2008). "Feminist Invitational Collaboration in a Digital Age: Looking Over Disciplinary and National Borders". Women and Language. 31: 8–19.

Both Sonja K. Foss and Cindy L. Griffin have applied the theory of invitational rhetoric to public speaking and have written textbooks on the subject rooted in invitational rhetoric:

- Foss, Sonja K., and Karen A. Foss. Inviting Transformation: Presentational Speaking for a Changing World. Long Grove, IL: Waveland, 1994; 2nd edition, 2003; 3rd edition, 2012. (ISBN 978-1-57766-721-6)
- Griffin, Cindy L. Invitation to Public Speaking. Boston: Cengage, 2003; 2nd edition, 2006; 3rd edition, 2009; 4th edition, 2012; 5th edition, 2015; 6th edition, 2018. 247–265. (ISBN 978-1-305-94808-2)

== Critiques of the theory ==
Following are the major critiques that have been offered of the theory of invitational rhetoric. Some of the criticisms of invitational rhetoric concern conceptions of the nature and function of persuasion:

- Persuasion is not violent, as invitational rhetoric suggests that it is. Some critics suggest that Sonja K. Foss and Cindy L. Griffin's view that rhetoric constitutes violence because it represents an attempt to violate another person's belief system is a flawed perspective. These critics note that those who engage in persuasion are not always trying to impose their will on audience members. In addition, such a view ignores the nature of audiences. Audience members may refuse to listen to persuasive messages and “have substantial power to resist messages with which they do not agree.” As a result, their individual belief systems are not being violated. These critics believe that “the impulse to persuade others is a constructive and valuable aspect of human symbolic interaction.”
- Democracy will be undermined if persuasion is disallowed. The intent to change minds and situations is at the root of the deliberative process that takes place in a democracy. If persuasion is not seen as legitimate, democracy cannot be sustained.
- Invitational rhetoric necessarily involves persuasion. Rhetors cannot help but be involved in persuasion when they offer their perspectives because the definition of rhetoric is persuasion; thus, persuasion or influence is an integral part of every symbolic interaction. Some critics use as support for this claim Foss and Griffin's initial article on invitational rhetoric. Although Foss and Griffin explain in this article that they are attempting to use the features of invitational rhetoric as they describe the theory, some critics suggest that, when they write about invitational rhetoric, they themselves are arguing that others should share their views. Thus, even Foss and Griffin cannot help but be engaged in persuasion, even when they are describing invitational rhetoric.
- Invitational rhetoric cannot involve agency because the enactment of agency is only possible through an effort to persuade others. Although agency has many different definitions, some scholars limit the definition to the effort to change others—unless rhetors are working to get others to change their positions, they are not enacting agency. In such a view, agency does not involve the kinds of activities involved in invitational rhetoric such as understanding, listening, exploring, and sharing. Perspectives are exchanged, but because the rhetors do not take action in the form of attempting to persuade, they do not enact agency.

Other critiques of the theory of invitational rhetoric are concerned with the nature of rhetoric and rhetorical theory:

- The theory of invitational rhetoric is based on a simplistic, reductive account of rhetorical theory and practice. The rhetorical traditional is not characterized by a patriarchal bias because many definitions of rhetoric focus on interaction rather than coercion. The interaction of gender with rhetoric has been complicated and varied throughout the rhetorical tradition.
- The appropriate objective for rhetorical engagement is social change, and it cannot be accomplished through invitational rhetoric. Invitational rhetoric valorizes non-confrontational and civil modes of interaction and thus cannot resist injustice and inequality; consequently, invitational rhetoric is “disabling to the oppressed.”
- Invitational rhetoric replaces rhetoric with communication studies and thus does a disservice to the field of rhetoric. Foss and Griffin see the terms as synonymous, but they are not. The term rhetoric means public persuasion, so invitational rhetoric situates rhetoric in a different realm—the realm of private, non-persuasive interaction. This is not an appropriate realm for rhetoric, and the status of rhetoric is devalued as a result of invitational rhetoric.

Other critiques of invitational rhetoric have to do with a variety of other aspects of the theory:

- A key tenet of invitational rhetoric is that all individuals have value; however, not all opinions or views have value. Invitational rhetors see others’ perspectives as significant and as providing important input into an interaction. Critics suggest, however, that not all perspectives are equally valuable. Those that cause harm, suffering, and death—such as those of wife abusers and rapists—should not be granted unconditional value and should not be appreciated and included in invitational dialogues.
- The principles of immanent value and self-determination contradict the dialogic goal of understanding at the heart of invitational rhetoric. Immanent value and self-determination imply a focus on the solitary self and suggest that individuals should close themselves off from other perspectives and privilege their own perspectives. But the invitational practices of offering and willingness to yield are dependent upon interrelationships with others and require knowing and interacting with other people. Mutual enlargement can only happen in interaction, and such interaction contradicts key practices of invitational rhetoric.
- Invitational rhetoric must include all of the ideas espoused by the theorists who influenced the development of invitational rhetoric. Ideas of theorists on which invitational rhetoric is based that were not a part of the theory of invitational rhetoric—such as Sally Miller Gearhart's biologism and Sonia Johnson's separatism—are imported into and considered part of the theory of invitational rhetoric. Critiques of any aspect of theories developed by those who have contributed to invitational rhetoric are applicable to invitational rhetoric.

Two of the common criticisms of invitational rhetoric are misreadings of the theory. They attribute claims to invitational rhetoric that are the opposite of what Sonja Foss and Cindy Griffin explain in their original article on invitational rhetoric:

- Invitational rhetoric is not appropriate in every situation. Although Foss and Griffin state that “invitational rhetoric is one of many useful and legitimate rhetorics, including persuasion, in which rhetors will want to be skilled,” some critics see them as calling for the use of invitational rhetoric on all occasions. These critics argue that there are times when persuasion should be used, such as in fighting fascism or trying to talk a friend out of committing suicide.
- Because invitational rhetoric is a form of rhetoric appropriate only for women, it reifies the gender binary and essentializes women. Although Foss and Griffin state that invitational rhetoric is not confined to “a particular population of rhetors” and is “used at various times by some women and some men, some feminists and some non-feminists,” some critics see invitational rhetoric as appropriate for women only. These critics equate patriarchy with the masculine gender, and because Foss and Griffin label traditional rhetoric as patriarchal, these critics see the alternative—invitational rhetoric—as linked exclusively to the feminine gender.
