= Dear You (film) =

2026 Chinese film by Lan Hongchun

- Theatrical release poster
- Simplified Chinese: 给阿嬷的情书
- Traditional Chinese: 給阿嬤的情書
- Literal meaning: Love Letters to Grandma
- Hanyu Pinyin: Gěi Āmà de qíngshū (Note: There is some debate about how to pronounce the character "嬷". The film crew said that it should be "mà" based on Teochew, but some Chinese media used "mó" which follows standard Mandarin pronunciation.)
- Teochew Peng'im: keh^{4} a^{1} ma^{2} gai^{7} cêng^{5} ze^{1}
- Directed by: Lan Hongchun
- Written by: Lan Hongchun; Zheng Xuanxuan; Yang Leng; Zhu Liyun
- Produced by: Luo Zhanhong; Xie Ying; Zheng Xuanxuan; Lin Guoming
- Starring: Li Sitong; Wang Yantong; Wu Shaoqing; Zheng Runqi; Wang Xiaohui
- Cinematography: Hai Tao; Zhou Zemin
- Edited by: Lan Hongchun; Peng Dong
- Music by: Wu Zehua; Li Yihan; Yang Leng
- Production companies: Shenzhen King Ant Pictures; Damai Entertainment; Rongde Holdings; Shenzhen Lichun Pictures
- Distributed by: Damai Entertainment
- Release date: April 30, 2026
- Running time: 118 minutes
- Country: China
- Languages: Teochew; Mandarin; Thai
- Budget: ¥14 million (US$2.06 million)
- Box office: US$295.5 million

Dear You (simplified Chinese: 给阿嬷的情书; traditional Chinese: 給阿嬤的情書; lit. 'Love Letters to Grandma') is a 2026 Chinese family drama film directed and co-written by Lan Hongchun. It stars a largely non-professional cast featuring Li Sitong, Wang Yantong, Wu Shaoqing, Zheng Runqi and Wang Xiaohui, alongside Thai actress Usha Seamkhum.

The film is primarily in Chaoshanese (Teochew), spoken in the Chaoshan region of eastern Guangdong. It also employs qiaopi, specifically the Teochew letters, as a narrative thread to tell the story of a young man who travels to Thailand to track down his long-lost grandfather, only to uncover a decades-old secret involving a stranger.

Dear You premiered in Shantou on April 17, 2026. It was released by Damai Entertainment in select regions of China on April 30, followed by a nationwide theatrical release on May 3. Made on a modest budget of ¥14 million, the film became a massive sleeper hit, grossing over ¥1.9 billion at the domestic box office. The film also made an impact in Southeast Asia. In Singapore, its Mandarin release sparked public and parliamentary debates regarding the Speak Mandarin Campaign. Meanwhile, the film influenced political campaigns during state elections in Malaysia.

== Plot ==
In modern-day China, Yap Sok Jow lives quietly in Shantou, believing that her husband, Tay Bak Seng, who had fled to the Nanyang region to avoid forceful conscription during the Civil War decades earlier, had deserted his family after sending a final qiaopi (khiâu-phoi, remittance letters) before ceasing all contact completely. Rumors began to rise within the family that Bak Seng had remarried, became a billionaire, and was running a charity for local schools in Thailand. Burdened by massive debt, her grandson, Hiou-ui, travels to Thailand to find his supposedly wealthy grandfather. Instead, he discovers that Bak Seng had died in 1960, he had never remarried, and the qiaopi sent since his death were from a Thai-Chinese woman named Chia Lam Gi. Hiou-ui tracks down Chia Zek Wah, Lam Gi's son, who uncovers the true story hidden in the decades-old letters.

In the 1950s, after being evicted from British Malaya, Bak Seng worked as a rickshaw driver and secretly stayed at a hostel run by the Chia family in Bangkok's Chinatown, eventually getting busted by the landlord's daughter, Lam Gi. Initially hostile towards each other, the two eventually became friends. Wanting to help the local Chinese children, Bak Seng and local teacher Di Gong secretly taught local children Chinese in the hostel, despite government restrictions. Lam Gi eventually joined the school and began learning to read and write Chinese. When some businessmen offered to buy the land of the hostel but were rejected, they burned down the hostel. Bak Seng heroically saved Lam Gi and her father Laisung, but lost his savings in the fire and was imprisoned for beating up the arsonists. During his imprisonment, Lam Gi sent qiaopi to Sok Jow and his family back in China in his stead. After being released, Bak Seng bought a riverboat and embarked on a new career as a ferryman to repay his debts, while Lam Gi took up odd jobs, sold food, and continued teaching the local children.

Tragedy struck in 1960 when Bak Seng was killed while thwarting a robbery on a neighboring boat. Heartbroken, Lam Gi could not bear to tell Sok Jow the truth. She continued to send money, letters, and gifts to Sok Jow in Bak Seng's name, preserving his family's hope. During this time, Lam Gi adopted an orphaned baby, Zek Wah, and both Lam Gi and Sok Jow indirectly shared a connection as they both went through motherhood. In 1978, Lam Gi planned to meet Sok Jow alongside Laisung in person to explain what happened. After Laisung peacefully passed away, however, Lam Gi abandoned her plans and instead wrote to Sok Jow, explaining the truth along with a group photograph of herself, Bak Seng, and the students they taught in her hostel. Unexpectedly, a typhoon destroyed the explanatory letter, leaving only the photograph to be delivered. Sok Jow misinterpreted it as proof that Bak Seng had started a new family and moved on, severing all contact and moving out of her home village so she could no longer be reached. Lam Gi kept writing and trying to send her letters until the remittance offices all closed down.

Back in the present day, Sok Jow finally learns of the truth of the photograph and Lam Gi's decades-long sacrifice through a phone call from Hiou-ui and Zek Wah. She travels to Thailand and is greeted by Zek Wah, Di Gong, and Lam Gi and Bak Seng's old students, who are now running charities for schools in his honor. Sok Jow finally meets Lam Gi, now suffering from dementia, and the two bond over their shared past with Bak Seng. The Den and Chia families forge a new bond, and Bak Seng's spirit tablet is finally brought back to his hometown in China.

== Cast ==
- Li Sitong as Chia Lam Gi (simplified Chinese: 谢南枝; traditional Chinese: 謝南枝; Peng'im: Zia^{7} Lam^{5}gi^{1}; pinyin: Xiè Nánzhī), a Thai Chinese woman managing her family's boarding house where Bak Seng stays
  - Usha Seamkhum as old Lam Gi
- Wang Yantong as Tay Bak Seng (郑木生; 鄭木生; Tay^{7} Bak^{8}Sêng^{1}; Zhèng Mùshēng), Sok Jow's husband who fled to Southeast Asia to escape conscription
- Wu Shaoqing as Yap Sok Jow (叶淑柔; 葉淑柔; Yab^{8} SoK^{4}Jow^{5}; Yè Shūróu), a Teochew woman who raises her children alone when her husband Bak Seng migrates to Southeast Asia
  - Wang Xiaohui as young Sok Jow
- Zheng Runqi as Hiou-ui (晓伟; 曉偉; Hiou^{2}ui^{2}; Xiǎowěi), Sok Jow's grandson
- Fang Peisong as Zia Laisung (谢来顺; 謝來順; Zia^{7} Lai^{5}sung^{6}; Xiè Láishùn), Lam Gi's father
- Zhao Shuguang as Chia Zek Wah (谢泽华; 謝澤華; Zia^{7} Zêg^{8}hua^{5}; Xiè Zéhuá), Lam Gi's adopted son
- Li Deru as Aunt Ru, a worker at the hostel
- Li Shuhao as Chuyuan's father
- Zheng Pengsheng as Uncle Long, Hiou-ui's uncle and Sok Jow's son
- Chen Qinqin as Di Gong (Tek Kong), a Chinese teacher who also wrote qiaopi at a yinxinju
  - Chen Jinbiao as Old Di Gong
- Chen Haixin as Chinese postman
- Yao Yuan as Chen Chuyuan, Lam Gi's suitor
- Xu Peiyong as Thai policeman

== Production ==
=== Development ===
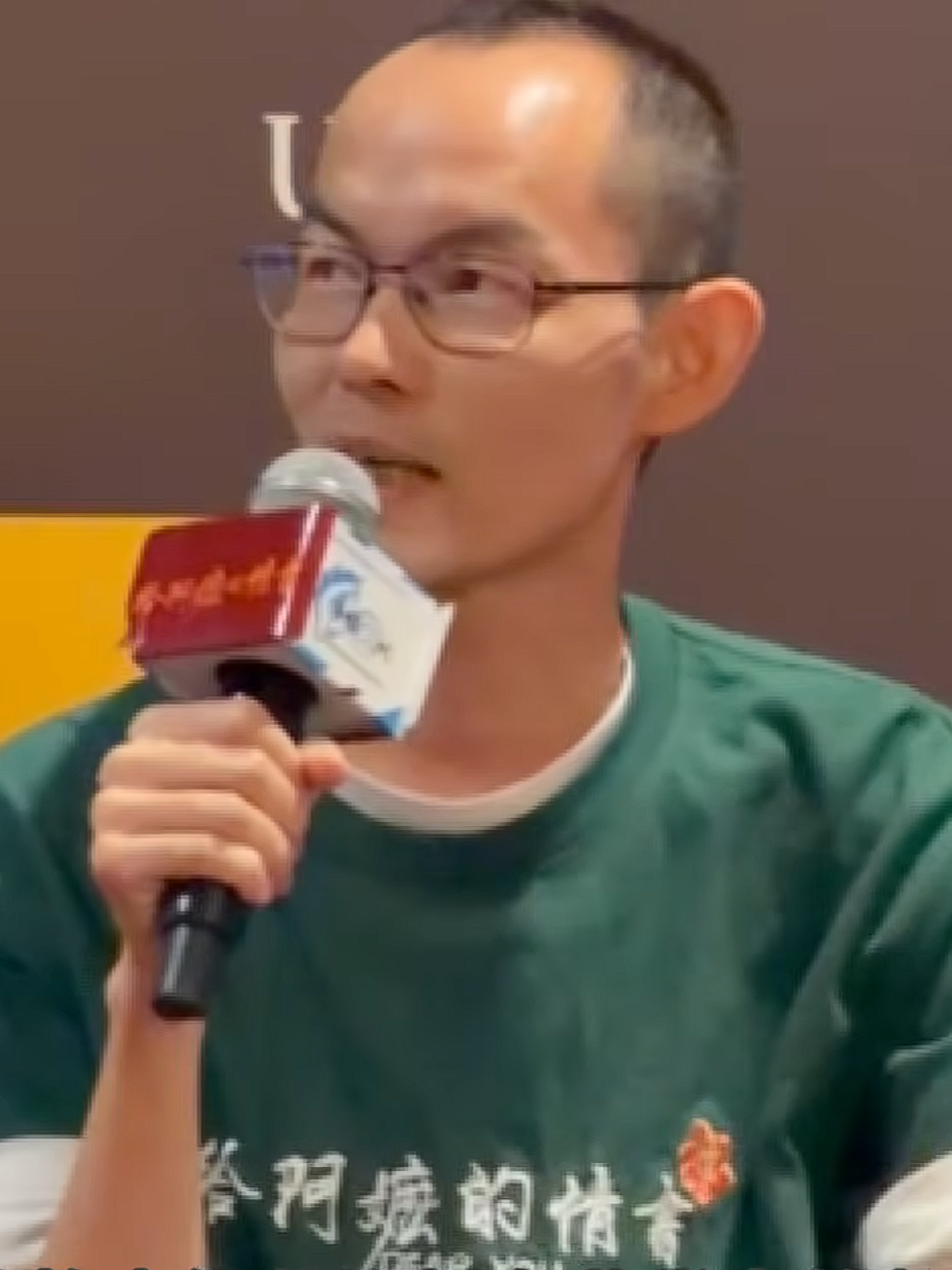
Director and co-writer Lan Hongchun.

The film was the third Teochew-language project directed by Lan Hongchun, following Proud of Me and Back to Love. Lan chose to feature different accents of Teochew, spoken in Shantou and Chaoyang. According to Lan, since his first two films centered on the father and mother respectively, it was a natural progression to focus on the grandmother for this third installment. The inspiration for the film stemmed from the real-life experiences of overseas Chinese that Lan encountered while filming the documentary Teochew (四海潮味), which explored Teochew cuisine around the world. Most of the details and plot points in the movie were rooted in true stories.

Lan Hongchun and his collaborator Yang Leng wrote the first version of the screenplay for Dear You. To improve readability, they enlisted Zhu Liyun to adapt it into a novel. When they sought investment, Zheng Xuanxuan immediately took a liking to the story. Lan Hongchun, Zheng Xuanxuan, Yang Leng and Zhu Liyun then formed a screenwriting team to refine the script further. To facilitate a quicker and more accurate understanding of the film's background, Zheng Xuanxuan and her team meticulously crafted a comprehensive guidebook to Siam, spanning tens of thousands of words. This guidebook delved into every facet of 20th-century Thailand, encompassing aspects such as daily life, culture and customs.

=== Casting ===
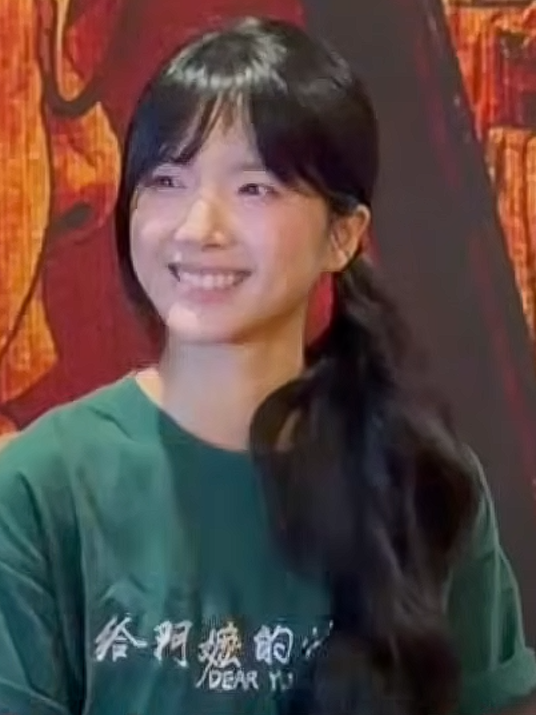
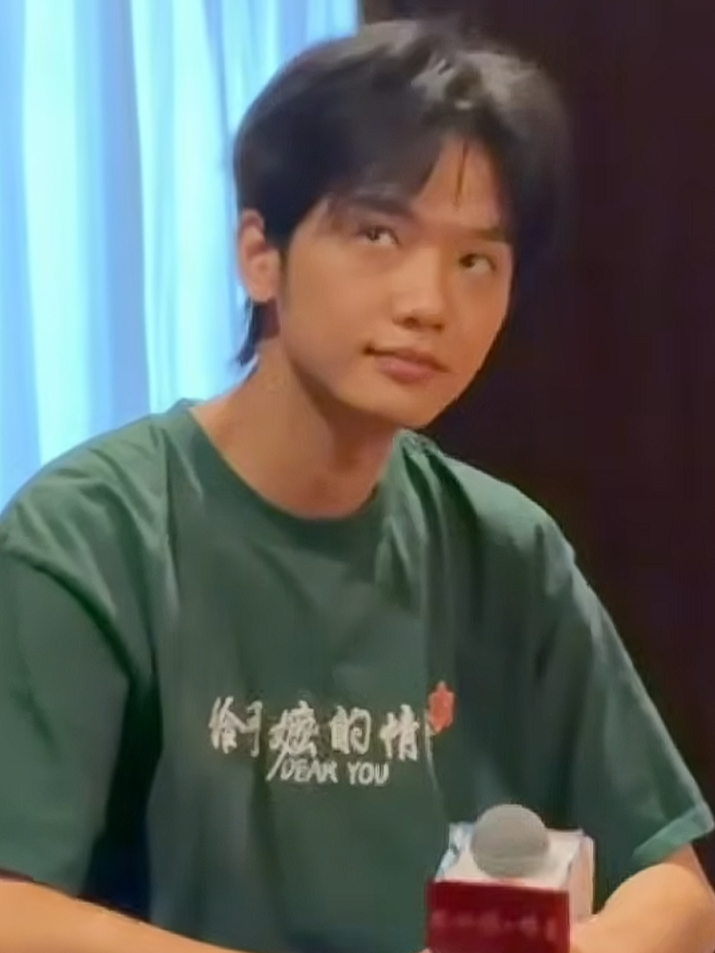
Li Sitong (left) and Wang Yantong (right) respectively portray Zia Lamgi and Den Bhagseng.

The cast of this film comprises mostly non-professional actors. According to Lan, the production team implemented the MBTI personality assessment as a reference during casting and conducted interviews with over 1,000 individuals. Li Sitong, a financial engineering graduate from Guangdong University of Finance and Economics who portrays Chia Lam Gi, was discovered on a short-video platform. Following this breakthrough role, she became a breakout star in China and intends to further pursue her career in acting. Wang Yantong, who plays Tay Bak Seng, graduated from Beijing Normal University, Zhuhai with a degree in the Art of Announcing and Anchoring. Wang Xiaohui, who stars as the young Sok-jiu, is an illustrator and designer at a toy company; she has stated that she has no plans to enter the entertainment industry for the time being.

The film's main supporting cast includes several local influencers from Chaoshan, who portray characters such as Aunt Ru, Xiaowei, Xie Laishun, and the elderly Ye Shurou. Thai actress Usha Seamkhum, recognized for her role in How To Make Millions Before Grandma Dies (2024), was cast as the elderly Chia Lam Gi. Despite having no formal acting training and speaking neither Mandarin nor Teochew, she relied on body language to convey her character's emotions.

=== Filming ===
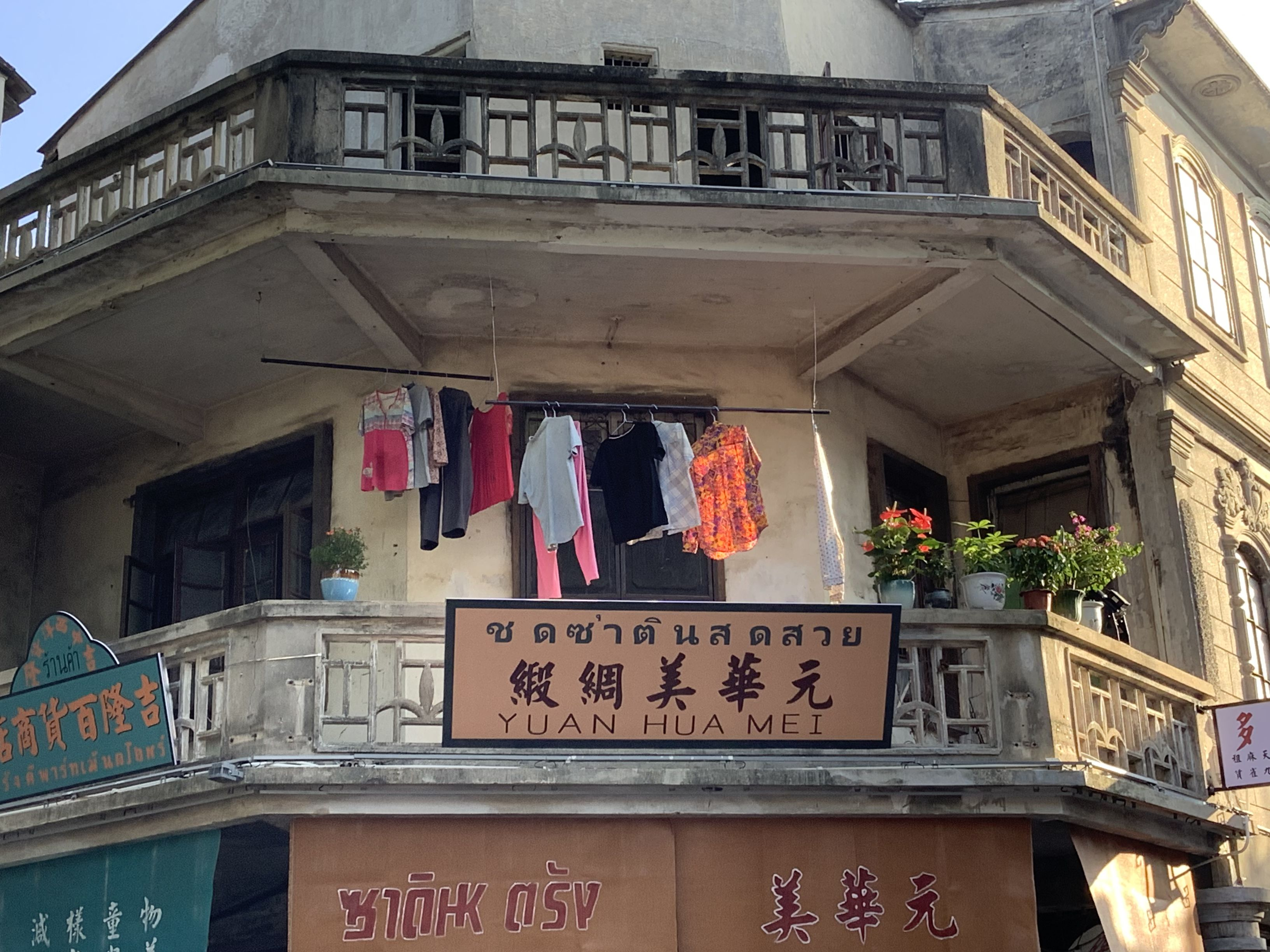
A filming location in Jieyang, Guangdong, recreated the scene of Bangkok's Chinatown in the 1950s.

The film was officially filed and registered by Shenzhen Lichun Pictures in December 2023 and commenced principal photography in October 2024, with extensive on-site filming taking place across various locations including Shantou, Chaozhou and Jieyang. To authentically capture the ambiance of old Siam, the production team recreated the setting of Bangkok's Chinatown in Jieyang, drawing inspiration from Zheng Xuanxuan's guidebook. Due to budget constraints, the team was unable to construct a full-scale set and had to rely on existing historic buildings to recreate the scene as faithfully as possible.

Some parts of the film were also shot on location in Bangkok, and members of the Tio Chew Association of Thailand were invited to make cameo appearances in the scene set at the association.

=== Music ===
The film's original score and soundtrack were released on April 29, 2026, through Lichun Pictures. Wu Zehua composed the score for the film. The soundtrack was produced by local band Toy Captain frontman Li Yihan and screenwriter Yang Leng. Li wrote several folk songs with the Nanyang theme; Beijing-born singer Chen Jia performed the film's theme song, "Brewing Tea Under the Moon" (月下煮茶).

== Release ==
Dear You premiered in Shantou on April 17, 2026. It held preview screenings in the Chaoshan region starting April 18, 2026, and expanded to the entire province of Guangdong on April 24. The film received official theatrical release by Damai Entertainment in Beijing, Shanghai, Guangdong, Guangxi, Fujian and Hainan on April 30, before opening nationwide on May 3. It was announced that the film would be released in IMAX theaters on May 23.

Dear You also had a market screening at the 2026 Cannes Film Festival on May 15, showcasing its distributors' intent to venture into the international market. The film's international release date was initially announced as June 18, in various markets including Hong Kong, Macao, Singapore, Malaysia and Brunei. It is set to receive releases in Australia and New Zealand on June 25, in the United Kingdom and Ireland on June 26, in Thailand on August 6, in Indonesia on August 7, and in France on September 2. It is also scheduled for release in other regions.

The film was originally scheduled for release in North America by CMC Pictures on June 26, but it was later confirmed that its North American premiere would take place on July 26 as the closing film of the 25th New York Asian Film Festival, and it would receive a theatrical release on September 4, co-distributed by Well Go USA.

=== Singapore release controversy ===
On June 18, Dear You was released commercially in Mandarin in Singapore, in line with the Speak Mandarin Campaign since its launch in 1979; films featuring non-Mandarin varieties of Chinese were only allowed on a case-by-case basis. The campaign targeted "Chinese dialects", a term rejected by some linguists due to a lack of mutual intelligibility, according to Tan Dawn Wei of The Straits Times; instead, they are just "variants" of a language. It restricted "dialects" such as Hokkien and Cantonese in media like film, television, and radio, but not for the Internet and arts performances. This was to aid Chinese Singaporeans' use of Mandarin, despite no linguistic evidence that knowledge of non-Mandarin varieties will affect Mandarin learning adversely more than knowledge of any language in particular. The Mandarin release of the film reignited debate about Singapore's language policies and the "cultural trade-offs" that were made, arguing about whether Mandarin and non-Mandarin varieties can co-exist.

Many interested viewers did not understand and speak Teochew fluently. They held interest in listening and learning non-Mandarin varieties as it allowed them to reconnect with something "largely lost" and drew parallels with their forefathers' migration to Singapore. The Mandarin-only release was met with disappointment from the local Teochew community in Singapore, as it would result in the loss of cultural nuance and quicken the decline of Teochew in Singapore. According to a 2026 survey by Chow Pei Tze, a professor at Nanyang Technological University (NTU), with regards to non-Mandarin varieties, a majority of Singaporeans said restrictions in media ought to be loosened, preferred to watch content undubbed, and disagreed that it would impede the status and learning of English and Mandarin. Tan Ying Ying, a linguist from NTU, described it as a response of grief and fear of a dying language and yearning because of the Speak Mandarin Campaign's restrictions. Some Singaporeans decided to travel to the neighbouring Malaysian city, Johor Bahru, so that they could watch the show in Teochew.

Despite Mandarin-dubbed Cantonese films from Hong Kong having been released in Singapore without much backlash, Dear You was a different case which "speaks of something a little bit more", causing more aggravation in the community. Films that did use non-Mandarin varieties, such as Teochew in How to Make Millions Before Grandma Dies (2024) and Hokkien in Money No Enough (1998), have similarly drawn greater attention. However, Loh Shurn Lin of The Straits Times wrote that the Teochew in the movie was slightly dissimilar from the variety of Teochew spoken in Singapore; elderly Singaporeans may not fully understand the dialogue in the movie. Loh wrote that the themes of the movie were more important than what language was spoken in the film.

Luke Lu, a linguist from NTU, said that it was a missed chance to allow for appreciation of the differences in the Chinese Singaporean community and Chinese culture. Dawn Wei wrote that it would give Singaporeans an authentic voice to tell stories in. Chng Hak-Peng, a PhD in history candidate studying Hokkien business networks, wrote to The Straits Times that Dear You reminded people that the cultural identity of Singapore stemmed from Chinese migrants who maintained linguistic flexibility for economic reasons. Darlene Machell Espena, an associate professor of Southeast Asian studies in the Singapore Management University (SMU), said that more recognition must be given to these varieties of Chinese to preserve cultural diversity. Tan Jun Yi from The Straits Times wrote that to only air the film in Mandarin was harmful to the movie's vision and the watchers' experience, and that the heritage is likely to disappear if preservation efforts continue to face challenges, within a generation of speakers according to Lu, with no way of recovery if it dies out, due to the ageing population according to Dennis Tan of the Workers' Party.

Singaporean filmmakers, Eric Khoo and Jack Neo, wrote in criticism to The Straits Times, that screening a non-Mandarin Chinese film and screening a French or Malay film should not be treated differently, while Lu compared the situation to the freely-aired K-pop on the radio versus the restricted Cantopop. Dawn Wei questioned the special treatment towards Dear You, when the government themselves recognised that non-Mandarin varieties were valuable, and that Singaporeans were influenced more by unregulated media on streaming platforms than regulated films. Jeremy Siow, a political scientist, Lu, Khoo, Neo, and Kong described the campaign as outdated, citing reasons such as Mandarin's new threat as English, the impossibility of Mandarin's decline, and the inappropriate uniformity of the policies towards different domains like education and arts. Khoo and Neo said that it was something cinemas should not bear the burden of.

In response to the demand, the Infocomm Media Development Authority allowed subsequent festivals and "niche events" to screen the film in Teochew, and said that moving forward, they will be more flexible in screening other non-Mandarin films, revisiting their film classification guidelines regarding non-Mandarin films. Meanwhile, the Ministry of Digital Development and Information said that they were open to support Teochew screenings of Dear You if the distributor applied for them.

The government had been loosening their regulations on films using non-Mandarin varieties over the years even before the film's release. Espena and Ying Ying said that the few Teochew screenings were a good sign of the government's increasing flexibility. Espena said that it reflected the changing attitude of the government towards openness regarding non-Mandarin varieties, and Dawn Wei said it was a significant shift in policy, but Ying Ying said that it was not a permanent solution. Eleven members of parliament from the People's Action Party and the Workers' Party discussed the issue on July 7. The ministers uncontroversially recognised the changed social context and the lack of competition between non-Chinese varieties and Mandarin, and deliberated how to balance Mandarin as a lingua franca and non-Mandarin varieties which carried cultural significance. Tan Ern Ser, a researcher and academic adviser at the Institute of Policy Studies, quoted the government's pragmatism and said that change will follow, and Chin Soo Fang of The Straits Times said that the change will be gradual. However, Dawn Wei questions how much change can be made organically.

Golden Village and Clover Films, the distributors of Dear You, screened the film both in Teochew and in Mandarin to give a choice for movie-goers. They sold out eight Teochew screenings in two hours on June 16, followed by another eight screenings in 1.5 hours on June 22, and another 40 screenings in three hours on June 29. More screenings were approved and put on sale after in batches. The tickets sold out quickly every batch; ticket scalpers were found on Carousell, selling tickets up to S$119 from its usual general price of S$18.50. There were also virtual queues with wait times up to four hours and physical queues of up to 300 people at the reported opening time of sales. Teochew screenings were only available at VivoCity before the June 29 sale, but were made available island-wide after, to allow suburban residents to watch the film in Teochew more easily. Community screenings, supported by grassroots organisations, were also organised to screen the show to more seniors. Ngee Ann Kongsi, a Teochew philanthropic organisation, sponsored 900 tickets only to organisation members and affiliated partners, such as Teo Yeonh Huai Kuan, Ngee Ann Secondary School, and seniors in the Ngee Ann Kongsi Social Impact Hub. On 23 August 2026, it was announced by Lawrence Wong in the National Day Rally that limits on non-Mandarin variety films will be lifted if a Mandarin dub is provided alongside it, balancing cultural heritage preservation and maintenance of Mandarin as a lingua franca.

== Reception ==
=== Box office ===
==== Mainland China ====
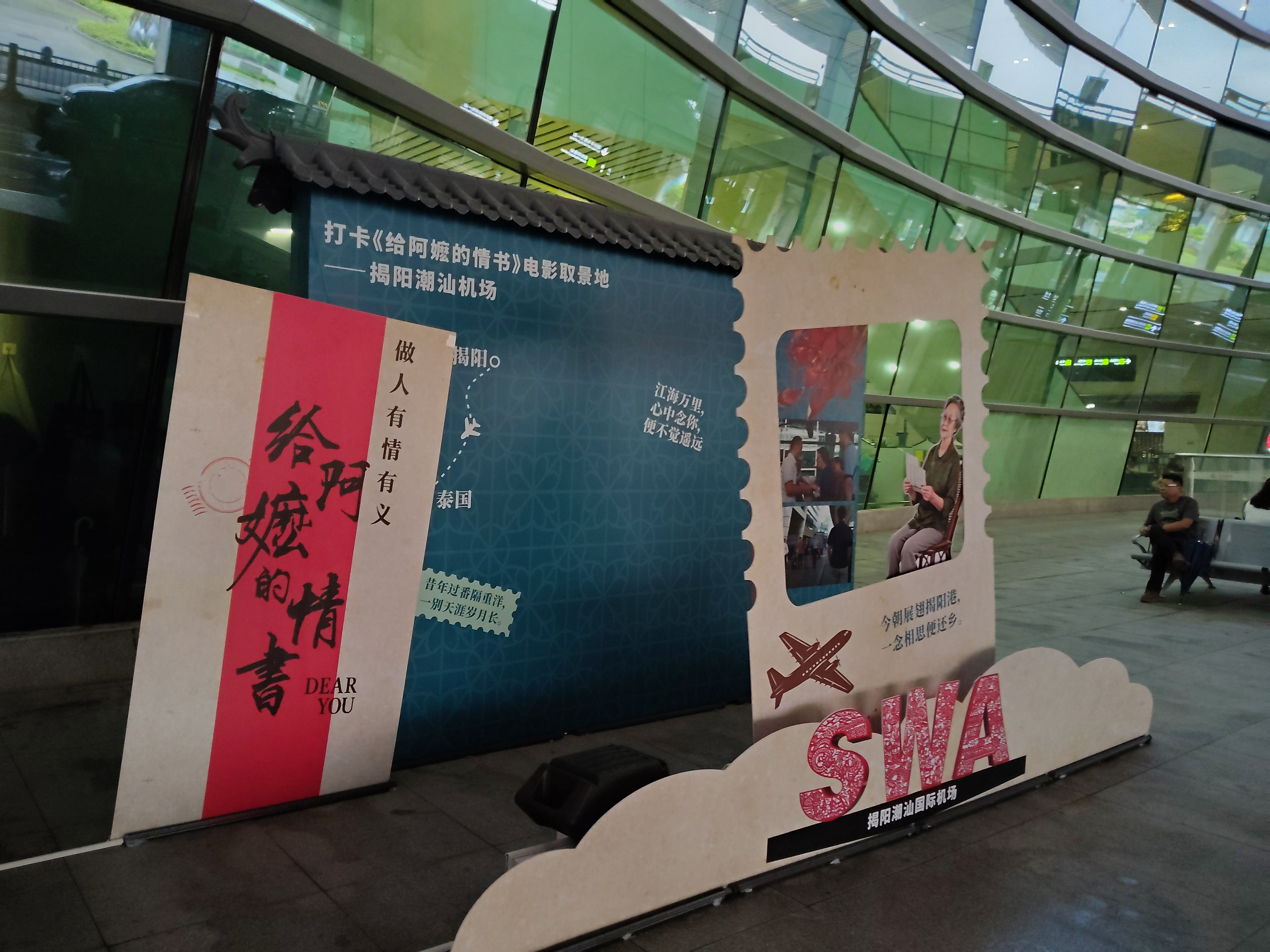
The film-themed photo op at Jieyang Chaoshan International Airport.

After grossing ¥3.77 million on its first day (excluding ¥13.43 million from preview screenings), Dear You went on to debut to ¥29.97 million. The film topped the China box office during the May 8–10 weekend, earning ¥62.6 million (US$9.2 million). It maintained its top spot during the May 15–17 weekend, earning ¥282 million (US$41.5 million). The film continued topping the China box office and achieved its peak at the third highest-grossing position in the world during the May 22–24 weekend, adding ¥309.4 million ($45.5 million) in its fourth weekend of release. The film remained at the first place for the weekend of May 29–31 and June 5–7, until the release of The Furious, grossing ¥199.4 million ($29.3 million) and ¥115.3 million ($17 million), respectively.

The film ranked fifth in its opening week and subsequently climbed to third place the following week. It then achieved remarkable success by topping the box office for five consecutive weeks in mainland China until Toy Story 5 was released, spanning from Week 19 to Week 23. (Note: Data from the China Movie Database: 全国电影票房周报（2026.04.27-2026.05.03）. 中国电影数据信息网 (in Chinese). May 6, 2026. Archived from the original on 2026-05-19.; 全国电影票房周报（2026.05.04-2026.05.10）. 中国电影数据信息网 (in Chinese). May 13, 2026. Archived from the original on 2026-06-03.; 全国电影票房周报（2026.05.11-2026.05.17）. 中国电影数据信息网 (in Chinese). May 19, 2026.; 全国电影票房周报（2026.05.18-2026.05.24）. 中国电影数据信息网 (in Chinese). May 27, 2026. Archived from the original on 2026-07-03.; 全国电影票房周报（2026.05.25-2026.05.31）. 中国电影数据信息网 (in Chinese). June 3, 2026. Archived from the original on 2026-06-03.; 全国电影票房周报（2026.06.01-2026.06.07）. 中国电影数据信息网 (in Chinese). June 10, 2026. Archived from the original on 2026-07-02.; 全国电影票房周报（2026.06.08-2026.06.14）. 中国电影数据信息网 (in Chinese). June 17, 2026. Archived from the original on 2026-07-02.; 全国电影票房周报（2026.06.15-2026.06.21）. 中国电影数据信息网 (in Chinese). June 24, 2026. Archived from the original on 2026-07-02.) As of August 1, its box office earnings had surpassed ¥2 billion, securing the third position on the 2026 box office chart of the market, only behind Pegasus 3 and Kung Fu Soccer.

==== Hong Kong ====
Within four days of its June 18 release, Dear You grossed a cumulative total of HK$3,867,795, ranking third at the local box office for the week. As of June 30, its box office revenue had surpassed HK$10 million.

==== Singapore ====
The film debuted in Singapore with S$460,000. As of June 25, the film had grossed S$630,000 in its first seven days of release in Singapore, with the Mandarin-dubbed version accounting for S$540,000 and the limited-release original Teochew version accounting for S$90,000. As of 12 July 2026, it grossed S$2.5 million.

==== Malaysia ====
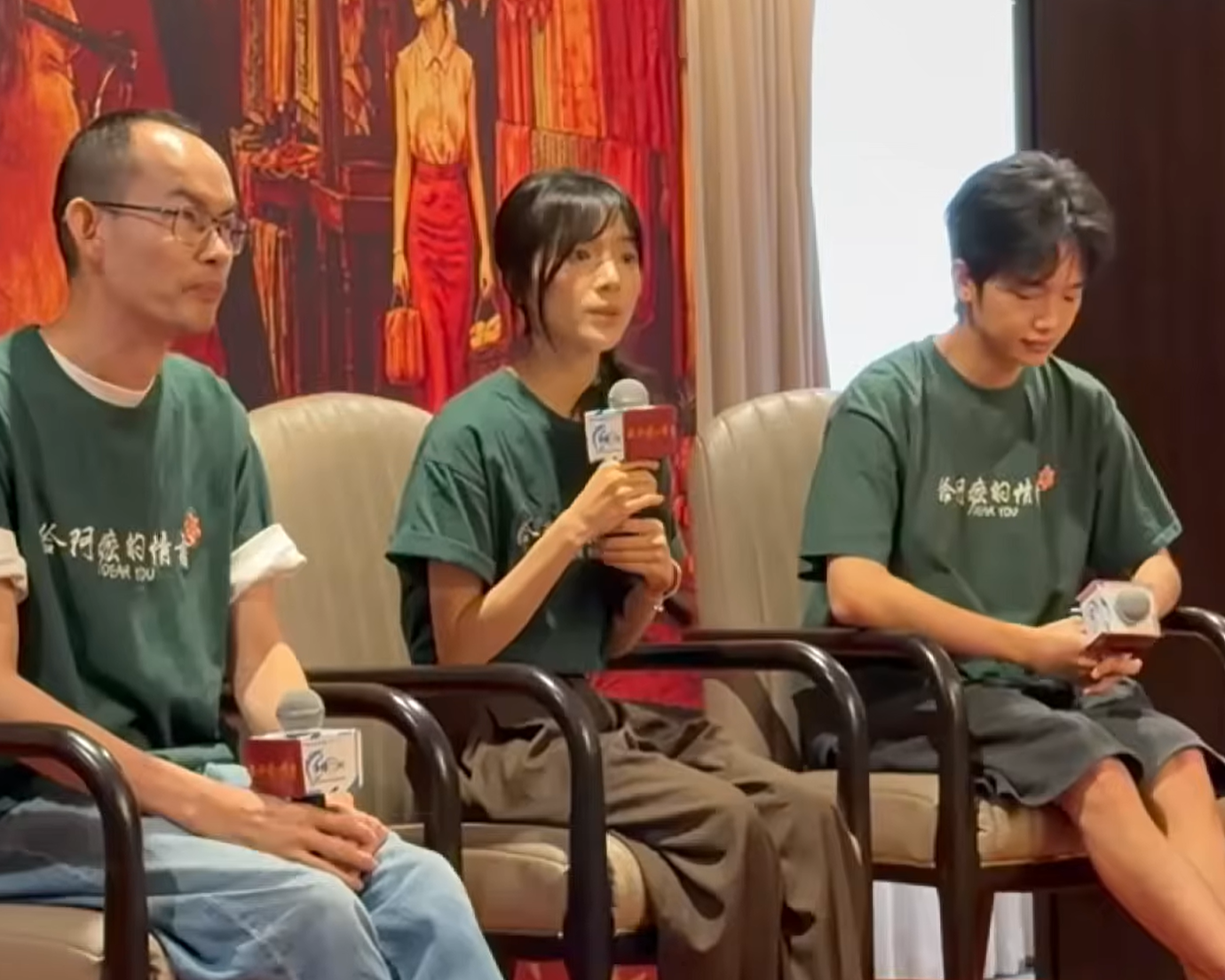
Director Lan Hongchun, along with lead actors Li Sitong and Wang Yantong, attended a Dear You promotional event in Kuala Lumpur.

The film's debut in Malaysia surpassed RM 1.2 million at the box office. As of July 13, cumulative box office revenue had surpassed RM 18.66 million, with 1.01 million admissions, making it the top-grossing Chinese-language film in Malaysia as of June 2026 and establishing Malaysia as the film's highest-grossing overseas market outside of mainland China.

==== Non-Chinese audiences ====
The film's core audience consists mainly of ethnic Chinese viewers. Combining figures from both demographics, its opening-day gross in the United Kingdom and Ireland reached £12,000, while its performance in Japan was at ¥964,000. On June 23, 2026, the global distributor postponed the film's release in North America, which had been slated for June 26, citing distribution strategy adjustments. Industry analysts had forecasted a non-Chinese audience share of under 12%.

=== Critical response ===
Despite being a low-budget independent film with a mostly amateur cast and lacking significant promotion, it unexpectedly went viral on China's social media and became a sleeper hit in the box office. The film initially accumulated a user rating of 9/10 on the Chinese online database Douban, and later climbed to 9.3, making it one of the highest-rated domestic drama films on the platform in the past decade. Simon You of IGN China gave the film a 9/10, saying that Dear You used "sincere" storytelling to accumulate emotions in ordinary details, showcasing the unique value of China's cinema. In a review, China's official newspaper, People's Daily, praised the film for its ability to evoke emotions and capture the essence of the overseas Chinese community's memories and bonds; it also commended Lan for highlighting the compassion and kindness of the Chaoshan people through the film. Douglas Montgomery of The Straits Times wrote that Dear You worked better than Beijing-supported films at promoting China, such as its history, language, and culture, to the Chinese diaspora, because of its authenticity and lack of state involvement.

South China Morning Post's James Marsh gave Dear You a 3.5 out of 5 rating and compared it to So Young (2013) and Hi, Mom (2021). He characterized the film as a highly nostalgic family drama whose emotional exploration of migration and ancestral heritage allowed it to defy expectations and become a word-of-mouth box office hit. The paper's editorial also noted that Dear You resonated with audiences due to its strong storytelling and authenticity, which highlighted the importance of family and community bonds. The piece argued that its success demonstrated that big budgets and famous actors are not essential for a film to achieve commercial success. He Huifeng observed that the exploration of Chaoshan's history and culture in the film, particularly the Nanyang migration histories of the 19th and early 20th centuries, captivated young people and reflected a growing interest in local traditions.

Comparing the "sentimental Teochew family drama" to commercial success counterparts like Hi, Mom, Elizabeth Kerr of Screen Daily praised its authenticity for offsetting the weak narrative, though she noted that the score and soundtrack were somewhat "saccharine", and its "cultural specific[ity]" might limit overseas appeal despite strong domestic box office performance. Gazettely's Zhi Ho awarded it a score of 7/10, praising the way it "treats letters as living objects". She lauded Li Sitong's restrained performance and the rich cultural texture of the remittance office scene, but noted that the film occasionally faltered due to a "heavy-handed score", a "narrow view of outsiders", and an "uneasy moral framing" regarding Nanzhi's sacrifices. Flickfeast's Katie Smith-Wong gave the film a 4/5 and also described it as a touching homage to those divided by distances yet bound together by their letters. In The Guardian's three-star review, Leslie Felperin described Dear You as an "enjoyable Chinese romdram" whose sentimental yet humorous narrative, strong sense of place, period detail, and naturalistic performances make it a worthwhile film despite occasional melodramatic elements. Robert Ewing of The People's Movies reviewed it with a 4.5/5 and expressed appreciation for its portrayal of themes such as "family, integrity, loyalty and language".

In commentaries published in Singapore's Chinese-language newspaper Lianhe Zaobao, Sim Tze Wei argued that the film's release in Singapore or Southeast Asia could deepen local Chinese communities' sense of identity with China and pose new governance challenges. Sim's perspective subsequently triggered controversy, Bernard Chan of South China Morning Post commented that looking at the film purely through a geopolitical or "soft power" lens oversimplified its impact. Writing for Lianhe Zaobao, Ji Yun, on the other hand, reflected on how Singapore, while striving for effective communication in English, should draw upon non-Mandarin varieties, qiaopi and other vernacular memory practices to mend transnational cultural ruptures. The Straits Times's Tan Dawn Wei, meanwhile, noted that the film brought the stories of Nanyang migration to a new generation.

=== Accolades ===
Accolades received by Dear You
| Award | Date of ceremony | Category | Recipient(s) | Result | Ref. |
|---|---|---|---|---|---|
| Asian Art Film Festival | May 21, 2026 | Best Asian Art Film of the Year | Dear You | Won | |
| Weibo Movie Awards | June 14, 2026 | Breakthrough Actor of the Year | Li Sitong | Won | |
| Weibo Movie Awards | June 14, 2026 | Breakthrough Actor of the Year | Wang Yantong | Won | |
| Weibo Movie Awards | June 14, 2026 | Influential Film of the Year | Dear You | Won | |
| Weibo Movie Awards | June 14, 2026 | Influential Director of the Year | Lan Hongchun | Won | |
| China Movie Channel Media Focus Unit | June 19, 2026 | Special Jury Prize | Dear You | Won | |
| China Movie Channel Media Focus Unit | June 19, 2026 | Most Popular New Actress | Li Sitong | Won | |
| China Movie Channel Media Focus Unit | June 19, 2026 | Most Popular New Actor | Wang Yantong | Won | |
| SCO International Film Festival | July 19, 2026 | Best Director | Lan Hongchun | Won | |
| 21th Changchun Film Festival | August 28, 2026 | Jury Prize | Dear You | Won | |
| 21th Changchun Film Festival | August 28, 2026 | Best Actress | Li Sitong | Won | |
| 39th Golden Rooster Awards | November 10, 2026 | Best Picture | Dear You | Nominated | |
| 39th Golden Rooster Awards | November 10, 2026 | Best Director | Lan Hongchun | Nominated | |
| 39th Golden Rooster Awards | November 10, 2026 | Best Writing | Lan Hongchun, Zheng Xuanxuan, Yang Leng, Zhu Liyun | Won | |
| 39th Golden Rooster Awards | November 10, 2026 | Best Actress | Li Sitong | Nominated | |
| 39th Golden Rooster Awards | November 10, 2026 | Best Art Director | Wang Zichao, Zhao Junxiang | Nominated | |
| 39th Golden Rooster Awards | November 10, 2026 | Best Sound | Wu Zehua, Li Yihan | Nominated | |
| 39th Golden Rooster Awards | November 10, 2026 | Jury Prize | Dear You | Won | |

== Impact ==
=== Johor state election ===
Due to the Johor state election on July 11 in Malaysia, political parties tried to gather the support of Chinese voters. On July 5, Pakatan Harapan advertised on Sin Chew Daily, with a grandmother writing to her granddaughter to vote, in reference to Dear You, which triggered Kuso Alliance, a supporter of Barisan Nasional, and Parti Bersama to make their own versions of advertisements. According to The Straits Times, Johor voters were unaffected by the advertisements, while a Kulai resident described Pakatan Harapan's advertisement as "moral blackmail", making Johor residents away from home cast their votes.

=== Increased heritage travel to China ===
According to tour agencies such as China Express Travel and EU Holidays, following the release of Dear You, there was an increased amount of Singaporean tourism to Chaoshan, a major qiaoxiang region and the filming location of Dear You, and China in general, ranging from about 15 to 30%.

=== Post-credits qiaopi ===
The film's post-credits scene features an authentic qiaopi written in 1960. The letter was authored by Xie Yingdiao, an 8-year-old Singaporean girl at the time. In the correspondence, she remits the scholarship money she earned for placing second in her school examinations to her grandmother in her hometown of Chaoshan as a Chinese New Year greeting. Now 74 years old, Xie was surprised to learn that her childhood letter had been used as material for the film. During the film's theatrical release in Singapore, she personally attended a screening at a local cinema and was photographed with the promotional poster. She stated that she was deeply moved to hear her native dialect in the theater and to see the qiaopi she had sent more than half a century prior, expressing pride in her Chaoshan heritage.

== See also ==
- Xia Nanyang – a century-long large-scale migration of Chinese people to Southeast Asia from the mid-19th century.
- Chaoshan culture
