= Wang Yantong =

Chinese actor (born 1999)

- 王彦桐
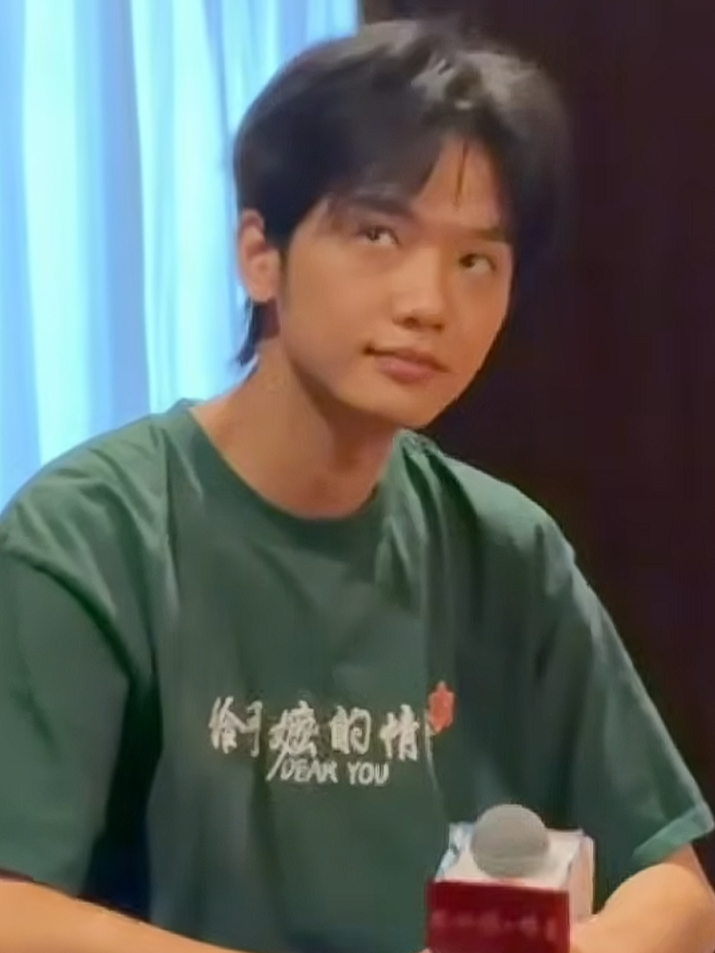
- Wang in Kuala Lumpur in 2026
- Born: July 31, 1999 (age 27); Shantou, Guangdong, China
- Education: Beijing Normal University, Zhuhai
- Occupation: actor
- Years active: 2024–present
- Agent: Easy Entertainment (2026–present)
- Known for: lead actor of Dear You film

Chinese name
- Traditional Chinese: 王彥桐
- Simplified Chinese: 王彦桐
Transcriptions
Standard Mandarin
- Hanyu Pinyin: Wáng Yàntóng

Wang Yantong (born July 31, 1999) is a Chinese actor. He is best known for his role in the 2026 Chinese film Dear You.

== Background ==
Wang Yantong was born on July 31, 1999, in Shantou, Guangdong, and is of Swatow descent. He graduated from Shantou No.1 High School, and later graduated from Beijing Normal University, Zhuhai with a major in Art of Announcing and Anchoring. After graduation, he experienced unemployment and had worked as a delivery rider, served as a host for film opening ceremonies and was cast as an extra in film productions.

In 2024, Wang Yantong and the director Lan Hongchun had first worked together on a commercial promoting beef ball kway teow. After learning that Lan was working on an upcoming film, Dear You, Wang auditioned for the role of Den Bhagseng for the film. During the production of the film, he persistently sought to join the production crew and was eventually accepted as a member of the behind-the-scenes crew.

Initially Lan thought Wang’s appearance was too delicate and did not match the lead role's image of the weathered and dark-skinned young man. In order to win the role, Wang subjected himself to an intensive transformation for several months; He went to the Shantou Port three months in advance to experience the physically demanding work lives of dockworkers and cycle rickshaw riders, naturally darkening his complexion and developing a rugged physique for the role. He also underwent an extensive accent training by integrating his native Shantou accent into a more compelling Chaoyang accent to better fit into the character's personality. His sincere dedication and transformation ultimately impressed Lan and Wang won the role.

Following the 2026 release of the Chinese film Dear You on April 30, 2026, in mainland China, the film set a box office record in mainland China. It was subsequently released abroad in Southeast Asia on June 18, 2026, and broke the box office record for Chinese-language films in Southeast Asian countries such as Malaysia and Singapore, thus skyrocketed Wang's popularity to the media and public attention.

On June 14, 2026, Wang officially signed a contract with Easy Entertainment and was invited to attend the 2026 Weibo Movie Night alongside with Li Sitong on the same day in Shanghai, where he won the Breakthrough Actor of the Year award. On June 19, 2026, alongside with another actor Liu Haoyu, Wang and Li won the Best New Actor and Best New Actress of the 23rd China Movie Channel Media Awards hosted by CCTV-6.

== Filmography ==
=== Films ===
| Year | Title | Original Title | Role | Note |
|---|---|---|---|---|
| 2024 | Summer's Finale 2024 | 夏日终曲2024 | Chen Weitao | |
| 2024 | My Name | 我的名字 | Ah Tian | |
| 2026 | Dear You | 给阿嬷的情书 | Den Bhagseng (aka Tee Poh) | main role |
| 2026 | Be With You | 不想失去你 | | |

=== Short films ===
| Year | Title | Original Title | Role | Note |
|---|---|---|---|---|
| 2025 | Northward Sunshine | 北向暖阳 | Boss Feng | |
| 2025 | Rebirth in the 80s: The Foolish Woman's Counterattack to Find Her Husband | 重生八零：傻女寻夫逆袭记 | Chen Songbai | |

=== Commercials ===
| Year | Title | Original Title | Role | Network | Brand | Notes |
|---|---|---|---|---|---|---|
| 2024 | So You Are Here | "粿"然是你 | male lead | Shantou Media Group | Guangdong Jiweicun Food Co., Ltd. | Short advertisement of Jiwei Village Chaoshan Beef Ball Goutiao |

== Discography ==
| Year | English title | Original title | Event | Notes |
|---|---|---|---|---|
| 2026 | Handwriting | 字迹 | 2026 Weibo Movie Night | with Li Sitong and Miriam Yeung |
| 2026 | Brewing Tea Under the Moon | 月下煮茶 | 2026 Weibo Movie Night | with Li Sitong and Miriam Yeung |

== Awards ==
| Year | Award Ceremony | Award | Work | Result | Ref. |
|---|---|---|---|---|---|
| 2026 | 2026 Weibo Movie Night | Breakthrough Actor of the Year | Dear You | Won | |
| 2026 | 23rd China Movie Channel Media Awards | Best New Actor | Dear You | Won | |
