= Li Sitong =

Chinese actress (born 2004)

- 李思潼
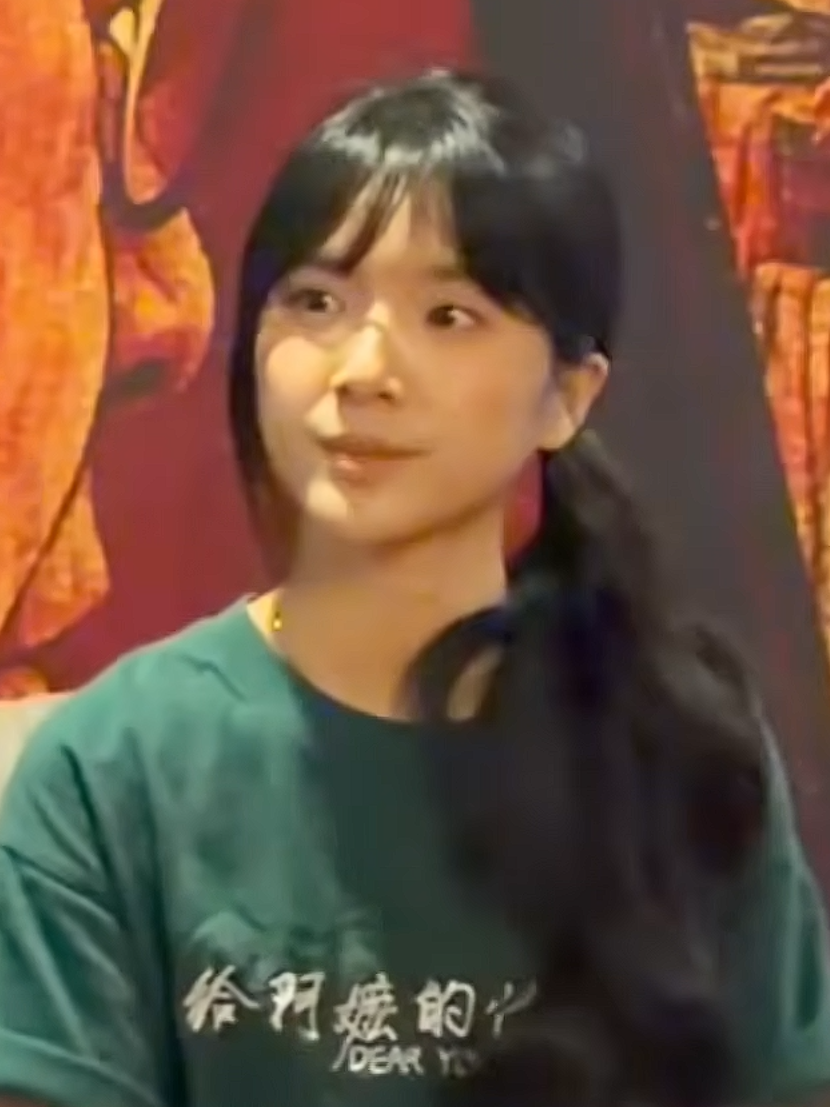
- Li in 2026
- Born: April 19, 2004 (age 22); Jieyang, Guangdong, China
- Education: Guangdong University of Finance and Economics
- Occupation: actress
- Years active: 2024–present

Chinese name
- Chinese: 李思潼
Transcriptions
Standard Mandarin
- Hanyu Pinyin: Lǐ Sītóng
Yue: Cantonese
- Jyutping: Lei^{5} Si^{1} Tung^{4}
Southern Min
- Teochew Peng'im: Li^{2} Si^{1} Tong^{5}

Li Sitong (born 19 April 2004) is a Chinese actress. Li rose to national prominence as a newcomer starring as Xie Nanzhi in the critically and commercially successful 2026 family drama film Dear You.

== Early life and education ==
Li Sitong was born on 19 April 2004 in Jiexi County in Jieyang, Guangdong, to a family of Jieyangese descent. In 2022, she enrolled at the Guangdong University of Finance and Economics to study finance. In 2024, during her second year, she was spotted on a short-video platform by the director Lan Hongchun, whose production team wanted Teochew actors and had seen a video she posted from Jieyang. When she was invited to audition for his film, she and her parents at first suspected a scam and checked the director's identity online before she went. On 26 June 2026, she spoke as the graduates' representative at the university's graduation ceremony.

== Career ==
Li made her screen debut as the female lead in Lan's Teochew-language film Dear You, released in April 2026, in which she played Xie Nanzhi (Zia Lamgi in Teochew), a second-generation Chinese emigrant raised in Thailand. The film, a story of migration told through qiaopi remittance letters, was made for about ¥14 million and grossed nearly ¥2 billion.

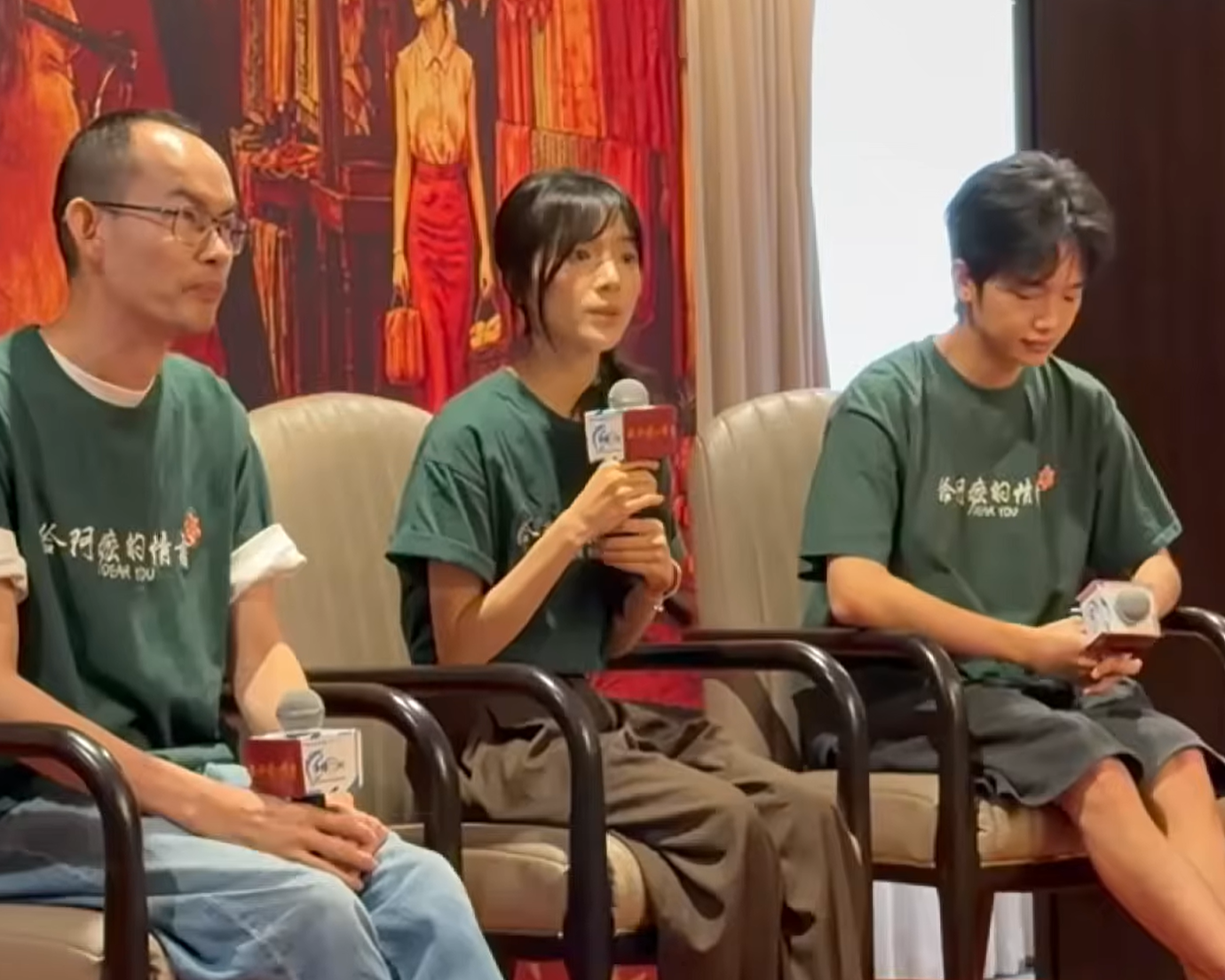
Li (center) with director Lan Hongchun (left) and fellow cast Wang Yantong at the premiere of Dear You in Kuala Lumpur, Malaysia (2026)

For the role, Li received the Breakthrough Actor of the Year award at the 2026 Weibo Movie Night in June, her first film award, and the award for most popular new actress at the 23rd Movie Channel Media Focus Unit. She was named best new actress at the 5th Asian International Youth Film Festival in Hong Kong, and on 28 August 2026, she won the Golden Deer Award for Best Actress at the 21st China Changchun Film Festival. Li has also written for the People's Daily. An account of her role, compiled from an interview, appeared in its overseas edition in May 2026, and on 1 October 2026, she published an essay on her hometown in the paper's literary supplement. On 12 May 2026, she was recommended by netizens as a potential candidate for the film adaptation of novel Land of Vulgarity to the Malaysian author Li Zishu, who had since responded that she had referred the suggestion to the respective filmmaking personnel. On May 14, 2026, Li Sitong updated her Weibo page account to "Actor Li Sitong" (演员李思潼), officially announced herself as an actress.

On 14 June 2026, Li attended the 2026 Weibo Movie Night with Wang Yantong in Shanghai, where they performed the songs Handwriting and Brewing Tea Under the Moon with Hong Kong singer and actress Miriam Yeung, based from the film Dear You, they also received the Breakthrough Actor of the Year award. On June 19, 2026, alongside with another actor Liu Haoyu, Li and Wang won the Best New Actor and Best New Actress of the 23rd China Movie Channel Media Awards hosted by CCTV-6.

On 17 July 2026, Li had been dragged into the spotlight for the wrong reason due to her "silence" to the brutal death of the mother dog Wangwang and her three puppies being committed by the four young teenagers under the age of 14 at Jieyang on June 28, 2026, which happened to be Li's hometown. As Li was yet to speak out against the act committed by the teenagers, netizens started to flood her account with negative comments demanding her statement. As some netizens discovered their comments had allegedly disappeared, which cannot be ascertained either due to the filtering of the platform's review mechanism or possible Li's moderation team, this further escalated with the boycotting discussions being made against her and her newly-made collaborating brand partner Cotti Coffee.

== Filmography ==
=== Films ===
Year	Title	Original Title	Role	Note
2026	Dear You	给阿嬷的情书	Zia Lamgi	

=== Commercials ===
Year	Title	Original Title	Role	Network	Brand	Notes
2026	My Father	我的阿爸		Yili	Shuhua	Short film of Shuhua Milk

== Discography ==
Year	English title	Original title	Event	Notes
2026	Handwriting	字迹	2026 Weibo Movie Night	with Wang Yantong and Miriam Yeung
2026	Brewing Tea Under the Moon	月下煮茶	2026 Weibo Movie Night	with Wang Yantong and Miriam Yeung

== Bibliography ==
=== Notable works ===
- May 22, 2026: Forever Standing Tall and Upward (永远挺拔向上) (People's Daily)

== Awards ==
Year	Award Ceremony	Award	Work	Result	Ref.
2026	2026 Weibo Movie Night	Breakthrough Actress of the Year	Dear You	Won	
2026	23rd China Movie Channel Media Awards	Best New Actress	Dear You	Won	
2026	21st Changchun Film Festival	Best Actress	Dear You	Won	
