= Vernacular memory =

Collective and informal communal remembrances of the past

Vernacular memory refers to collective, informal, and often personal ways that communities remember and commemorate the past, distinct from official or monumental narratives. It encompasses shared stories, traditions, personal testimonies, and everyday spaces that hold historical significance, such as family stories, local landmarks, and digital memorials like social media profiles.

The term was introduced by John Bodnar in his book Remaking America: Public memory, commemoration, and patriotism in the twentieth century (1992).

Bodnar defines vernacular memory in contrast to official memory. The former is the spontaneous, grassroots form of remembrance that arises from everyday experience, while the latter represents the institutionalized, elite-driven interpretation of the past.
