= Teochew letters =

Letters among the Teochew diaspora

Teochew letters (Chinese: 潮汕僑批; pinyin: Cháoshàn Qiáopī; Pe̍h-ūe-jī: Tiê-suaⁿ Khiâu-phoi / Tiô-suaⁿ Khiêu-phoi) were a form of family correspondence combined with remittances, sent by Teochew immigrants in Southeast Asia (particularly Thailand, Singapore, Malaysia, Indonesia, Vietnam and Cambodia) as well as Hong Kong, to their families in the Teochew region (now known as Chaoshan in Mandarin), in eastern Guangdong Province, China.

== History ==
Qiaopi were sent from the early 19th century till the 20th century. They were initially delivered by men known as zui-kheh (Chinese: 水客; Pe̍h-ūe-jī: tsúi-kheh; literally "water traveller"), who travelled frequently between Southeast Asia and the Teochew region for business. Towards the end of the 19th century, delivery of the Teochew qiaopi became a full-fledged industry (Chinese: 侨批业; Pe̍h-ūe-jī: khiêu-phoi ngiêp / khiâu-phoi ngia̍p). Qiaopi agencies in Southeast Asia collected the letters and remittances from the migrant workers and sent them to their corresponding partner in Swatow. The agencies in Swatow then distributed the letters to local agencies located in the counties and villages of the Teochew region. The men employed to hand-deliver the letters and money to the families were known as phoe-kha (Chinese: 批跤; Pe̍h-ūe-jī: phoi-kha; literally "feet of the letters"). The qiaopi industry ended in 1979 when the government in China ordered its functions to be transferred to the Bank of China.

Family correspondence combined with remittance was not unique to the Teochews. Other groups of overseas Chinese, including the Hokkien, the Cantonese and the Hakka, also used this method to communicate with their families. The qiaopi agencies of the different groups served only their own community circle and their services did not overlap. An estimated 170,000 qiaopi letters have been collected by researchers and private collectors. The majority are Teochew qiaopi. The Museum of Overseas Remittance Mail Relics, based in Swatow, has a collection of 120,000 Teochew qiaopi letters, consisting of both originals and copies. Teochew qiaopi are an archive of the cultural and collective historical experiences of the Teochew people. Their contents reflect society at all levels, touching on international relations, national issues, and details of daily life important to families. As such, the information they contain bears intrinsic value for further research, as they are able to authenticate and supplement contemporary written history.

== Terms ==
Qiaopi (僑批) literally means "letter of the overseas Chinese", with "phoe" (批) being the Southern Min expression for "letter". The term has sometimes been translated as "overseas remittance mail" or "money remittance mail", but these fail to capture the cultural aspect of the artefacts.

== UNESCO Memory of the World Register ==
As part of the larger Archive of Overseas Remittance Mails, the Teochew qiaopi were added to the China Archival Heritage Register in 2010. Together with the qiaopi collection of Jiangmen, Meizhou and Fujian, the Teochew qiaopi were included in the Asia/Pacific Regional Memory of the World (MOW) Register on 16 May 2012. To increase general awareness of the Teochew qiaopi and to promote efforts to apply for their inclusion in the prestigious UNESCO Memory of the World Register, the Museum of Overseas Remittance Mail Relics launched an online museum for the Teochew qiaopi letters in June 2012. The website was created on behalf of the museum by the Cheung Kong School of Journalism of Shantou University. The Teochew letters were added to the UNESCO Memory of the World Register in 2013.

== See also ==
- Qiaopi
