= Lan Hongchun =

Chinese film director and screenwriter

- 蓝鸿春
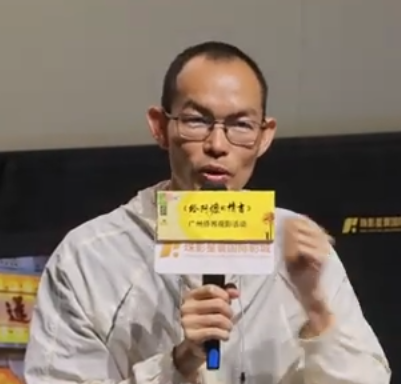
- Director and co-writer Lan Hongchun.
- Born: Shantou, Guangdong, China
- Education: South China Normal University
- Occupations: film director, producer, screenwriter
- Years active: 2010–present
- Employer: Shenzhen Lichun Film Industry (founder)
- Known for: director of "Chaoshan Trilogy" films

Chinese name
- Traditional Chinese: 藍鴻春
- Simplified Chinese: 蓝鸿春
Transcriptions
Standard Mandarin
- Hanyu Pinyin: Lán Hóngchūn

Lan Hongchun is a Chinese film director, producer, and screenwriter. His major filmmaking works were the "Chaoshan Trilogy" of Teochew films consisted of Proud of Me, Back to Love and Dear You. His works often involves Chaoshan culture as a background theme and incorporates humanistic care into a realism style.

== Background ==
Born in Shantou, Guangdong, China. Lan Hongchun graduated from South China Normal University with a major in Chinese Language and Literature. In 2010 he worked as a documentary director for Phoenix Television in Hong Kong for six years, where he produced several Chaoshan culture-themed documentaries. In 2016, he went on to found his own film and television production company Shenzhen Lichun Film Industry Co., Ltd.

In 2018, his first Teochew language debut film Proud of Me was released in mainland China. The film, which was produced with a very low budget, grossed 47.6 million RMB at the box office, becoming a phenomenal example for the Chinese dialect films and successfully brought the Chaoshan culture into the public spotlight.

His next Teochew language film Back to Love was released on January, 2022 with box office of about 23.74 million RMB. Although his second feature film did not reach the level of his first film, it was considered a remarkable achievement of the dialect film genre.

On April 30, 2026, his third Teochew language Chinese film, Dear You, based upon the qiaopi (Teochew letters) during the Xia Nanyang era of the 1950s, was released in mainland China, immediately sparking a craze among the Chinese people at home and abroad. Since its release, the film had reached a rating of 9.3 on Douban and had grossed over 1 billion yuan, becoming a major sleeper hit in the box office.

== Filmography ==
=== Films ===
Year	Title	Original Title	Role	Note
2018	Proud of Me	爸，我一定行的	director, screenwriter	
2022	Back to Love	带你去见我妈	director, screenwriter	
2026	Dear You	给阿嬷的情书	director, screenwriter	
2026	Be With You	不想失去你	producer	

=== Documentaries ===
Year	Title	Original Title	Network	Notes
2023	From the South: A Documentary on the Current Creation Status of Guangdong Dialect Films	风自南来：广东方言电影创作现状纪实	GRT	49 minutes documentary
2026	Teochew	四海潮味	Tencent Video	15 episode
