= Chaoshan culture =

Teochew people, Guangdong Province, China

Chaoshan culture
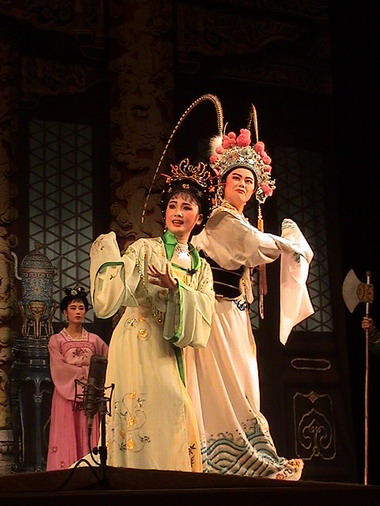
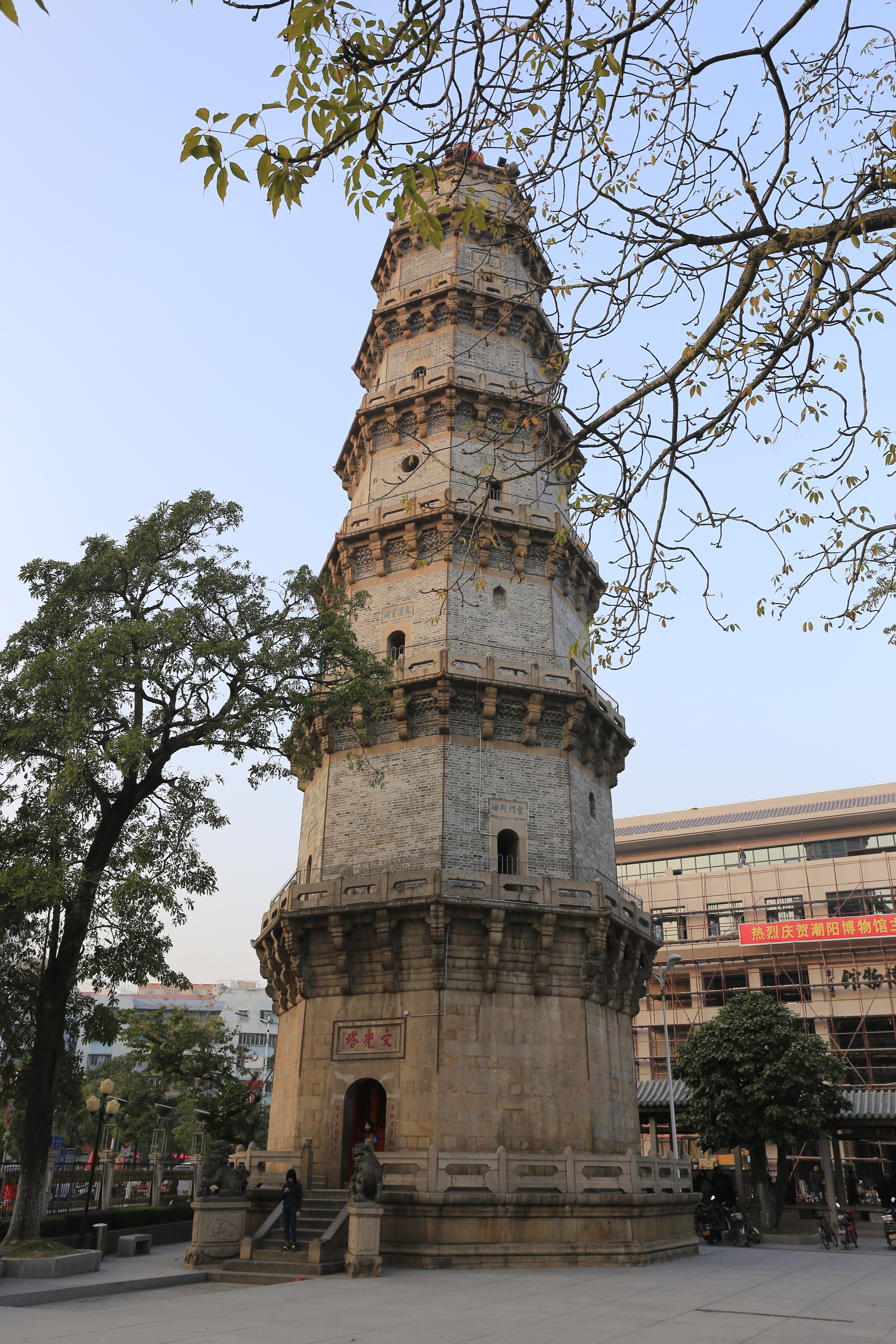
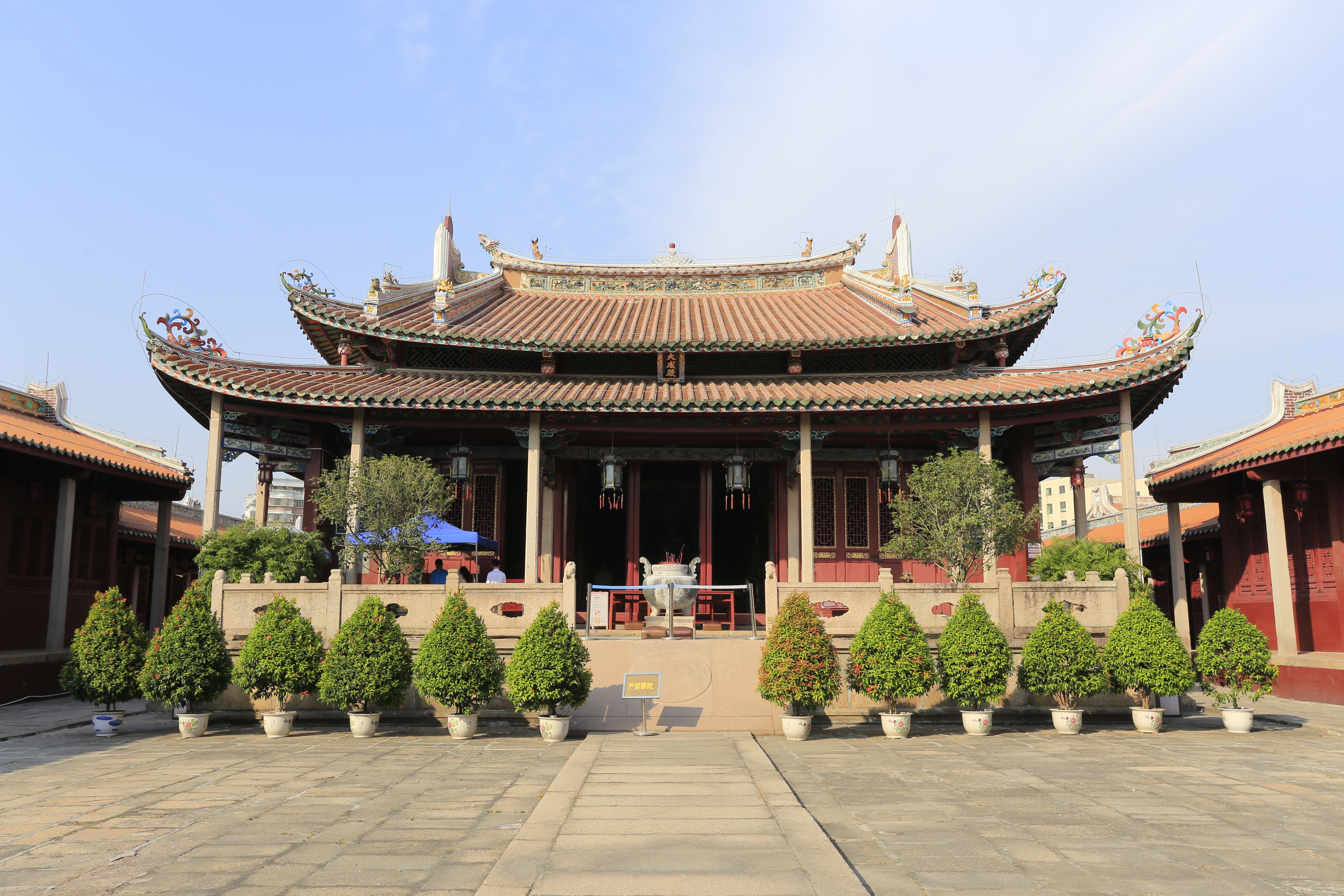
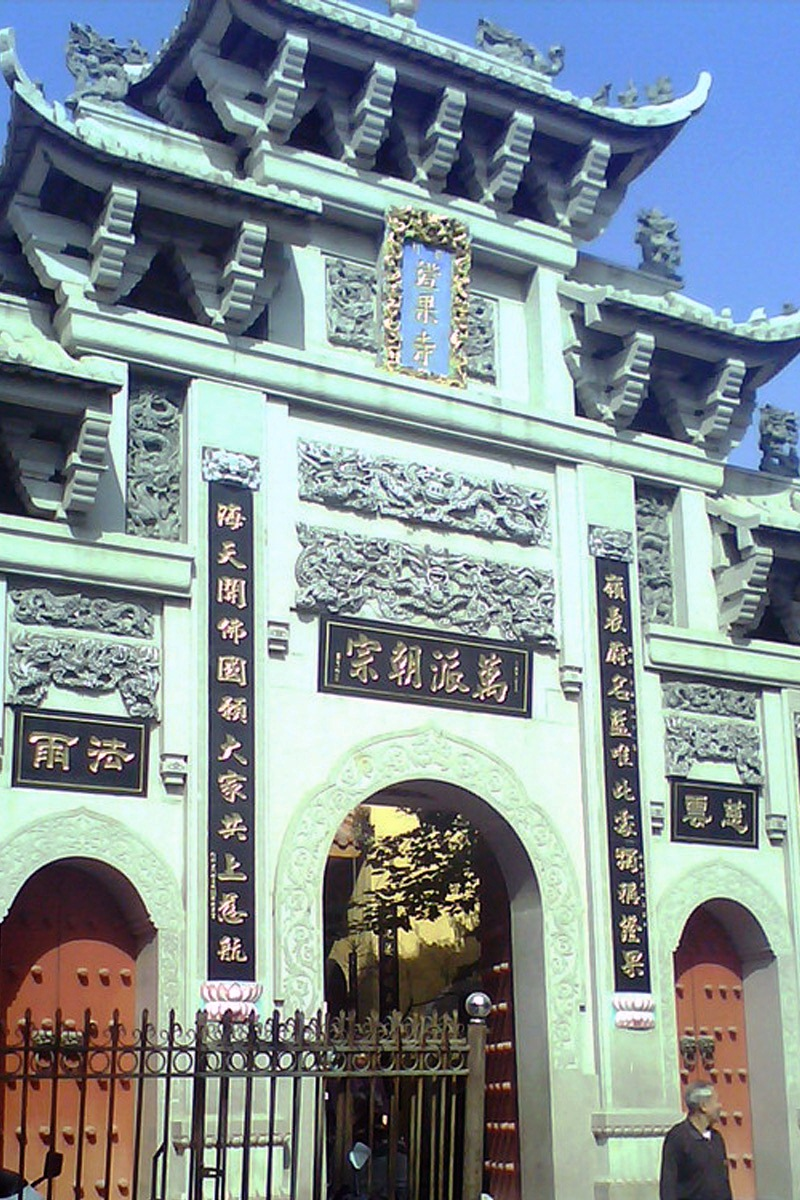
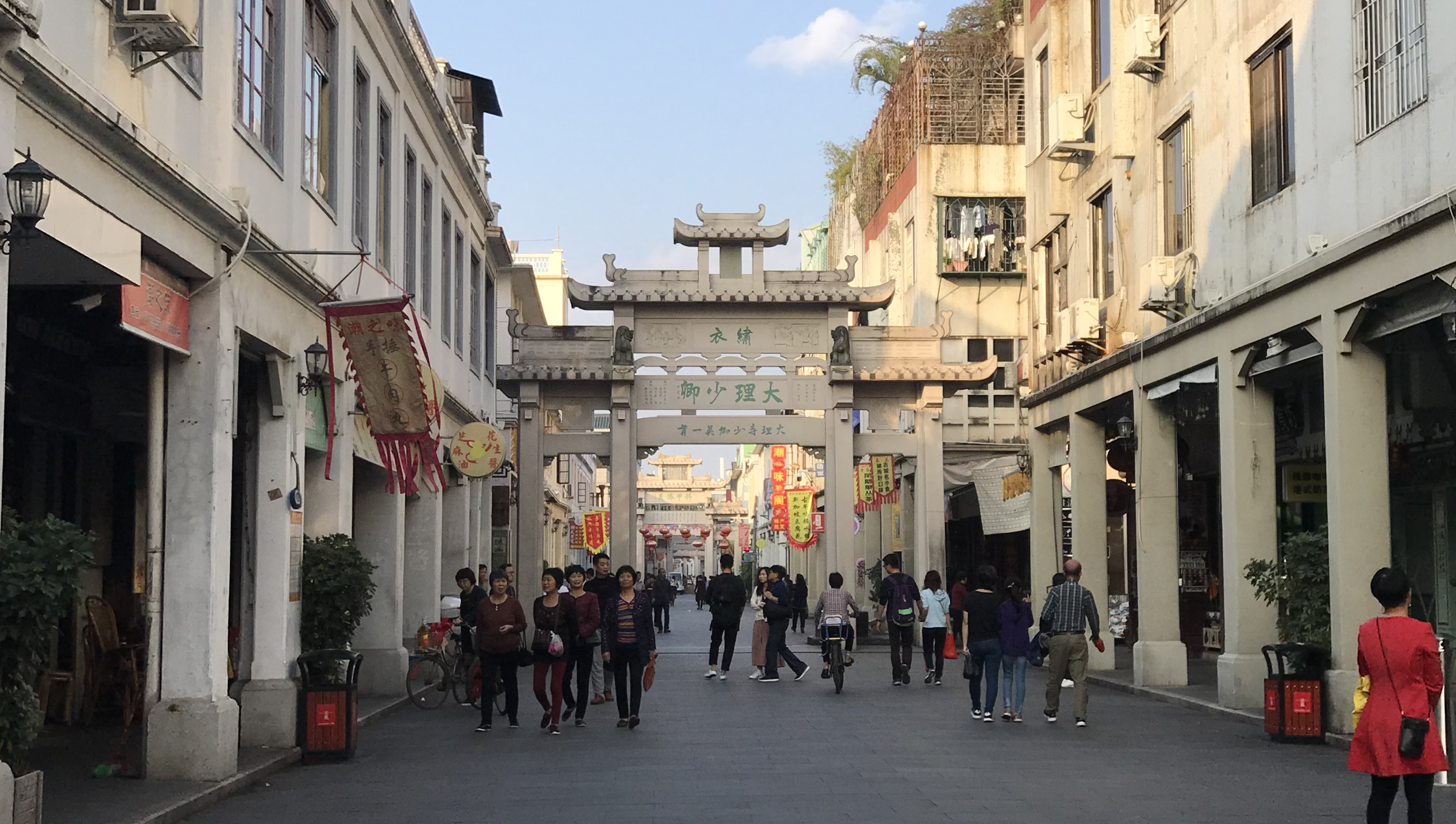
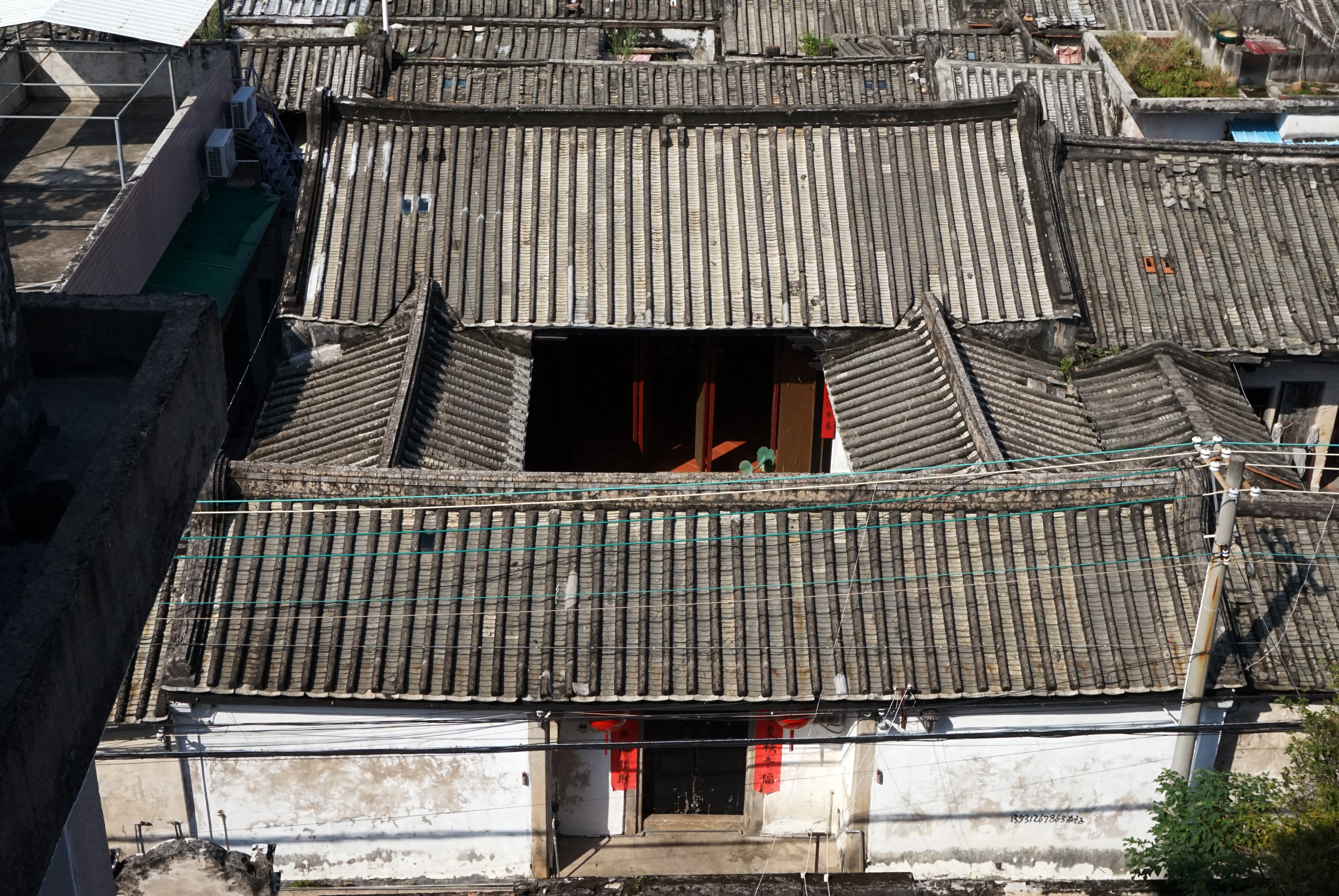

Chaoshan culture (Chinese: 潮汕文化), also known as Teochew culture, is the culture created by the Teochew people in the Chaoshan region, encompassing the three cities of Chaozhou, Shantou, and Jieyang of eastern Guangdong Province of China. Chaoshan culture has a history of over two millennia, and characteristics in language, opera, music, cuisine, tea practice, embroidery and oversea life, etc.

== Teochew language ==
The Teochew language, or "Chaoshan language", is a series of dialect varieties spoken by roughly 10 million people in Chaoshan and more than five million outside mainland China.

Teochew language is a branch of Southern Min and preserves archaic pronunciations lost in Mandarin Chinese, such as the rusheng (entering tone). It has eight tones compared to the six tones found in Cantonese and the four to five tones found in Mandarin, which makes it one of the most difficult variants of Chinese to master.

== Teochew Cuisine ==
Teochew cuisine is fresh and light. There are also unique local sauces such as the pruning soy sauce, Shantou sweet and spicy sauce, garlic white vinegar sauce, and fermented fish sauce. Teochew (also Chaoshan or Chiu Chow or Chaozhou) cooking focuses on restraint and subtlety and avoids heavy seasonings to highlight the freshness of ingredients. The ingredients of Chaoshan dishes usually include white olives, rice noodles, or mandarin oranges. These ingredients often come from the sea in Chaoshan.

The cooking methods of Chaoshan dishes are diversified, including brining, deep-frying, pan-frying, braising, alive marinating, stewing, roasting, smoking, steam stewing, dressing, etc. The most used method among these is brining. Chaoshan brined meat is the signature dish in Chaoshan cuisine. Meat is brined together with rich flavors. Local dishes also use marinated raw seafood, such as colorful flower crabs steeped in a bath of vinegar, salt, chilis and cilantro. Other famous dishes include Braised Lion-head Goose and Chaoshan Hotpot, and Teochew oyster omelet.

Chaoshan has a rich history of farming and drying seaweed. The ancient Teochew tradition of preparing thinly sliced raw fish was later exported to Japan, becoming known as sashimi.

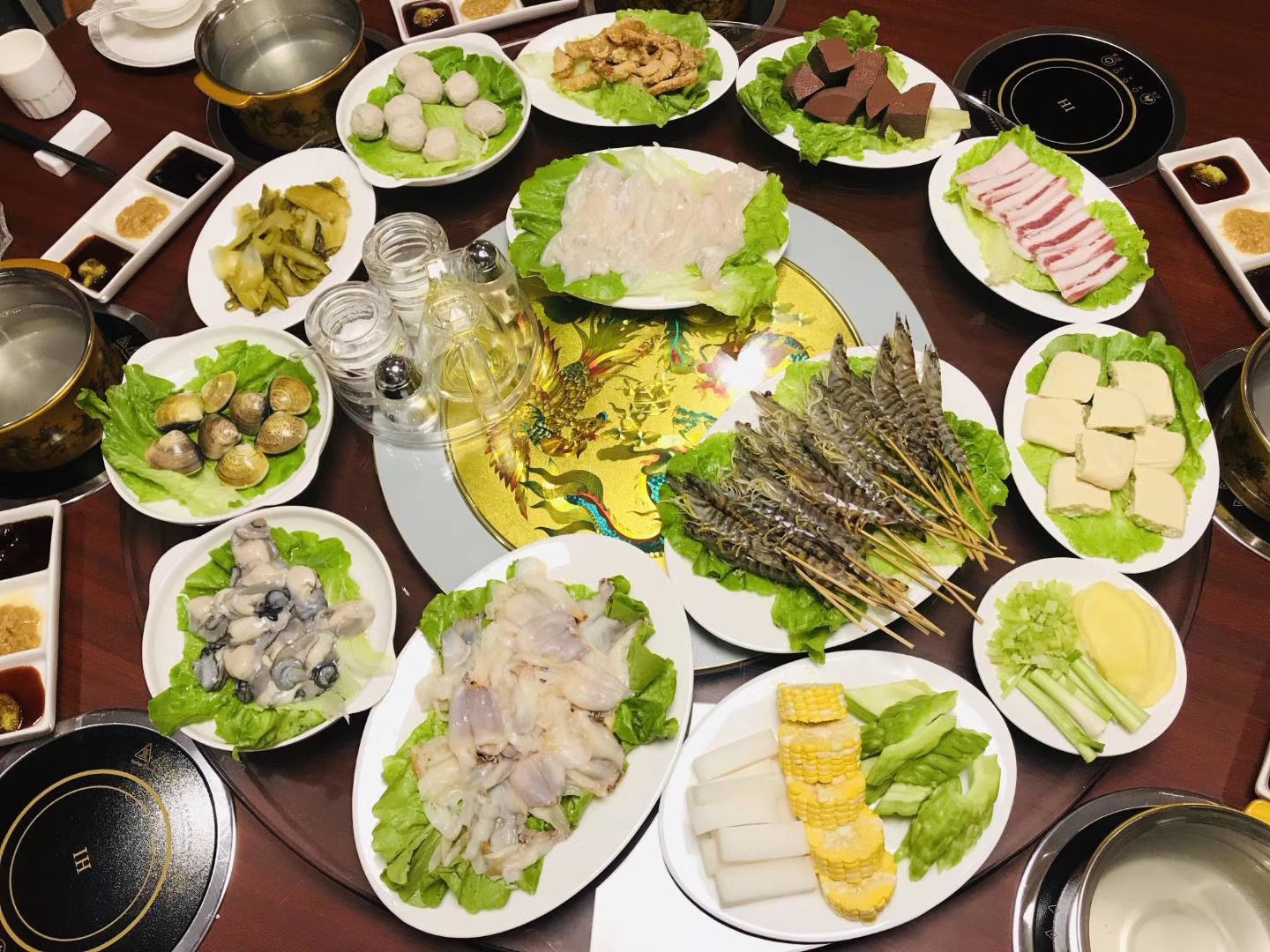
Chaoshan seafood hotpot

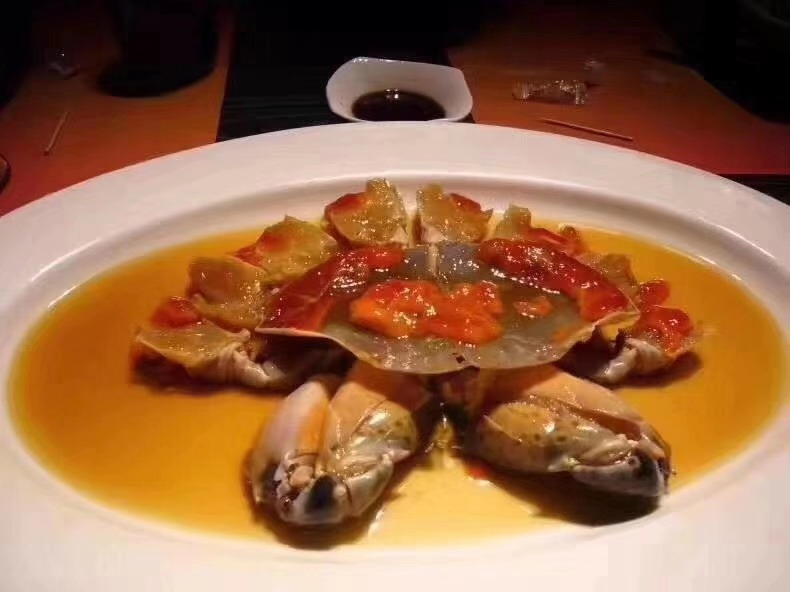
Drunken crabs

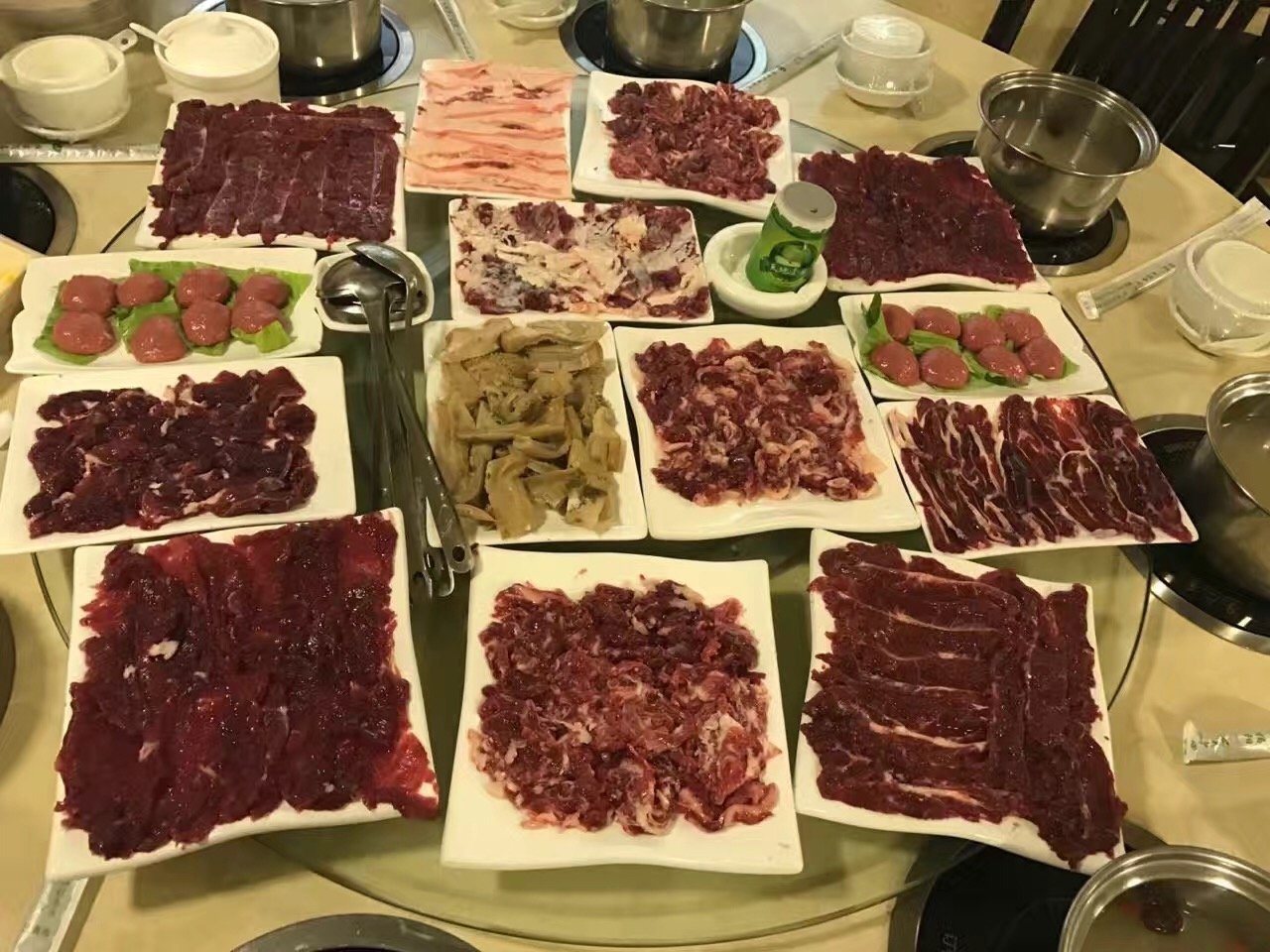
Chaoshan beef hotpot

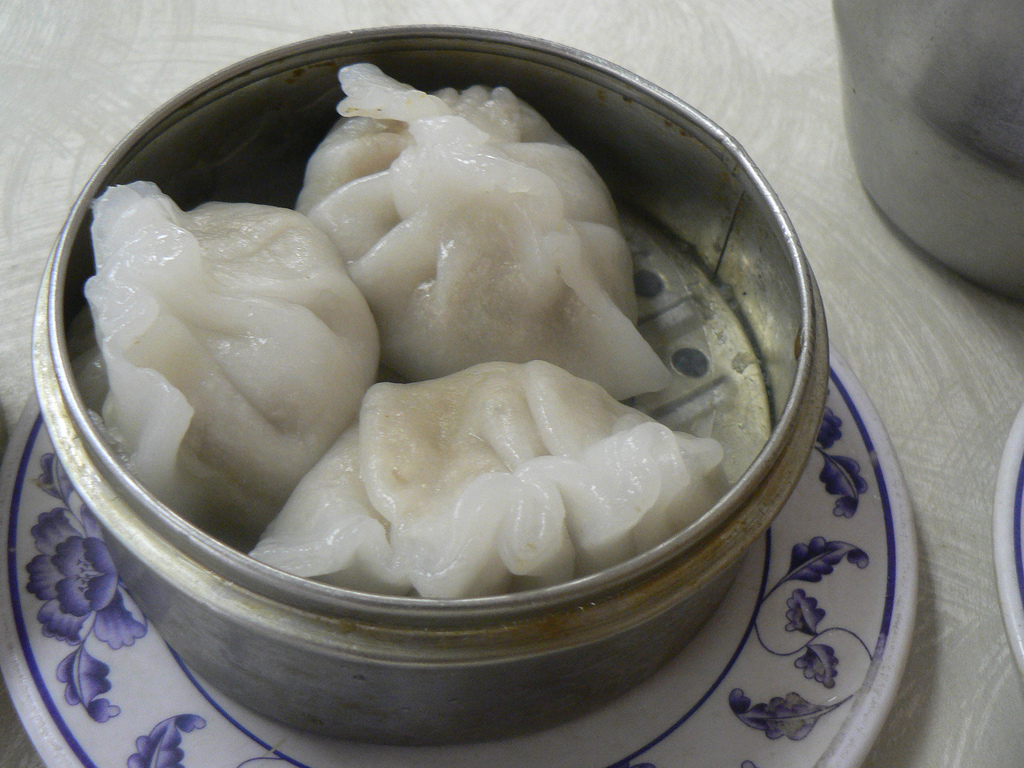
Fun guo

== Gongfu tea ==
Gongfu tea, the "espresso" with tiny cups of strong and fragrant tea, was first consumed back in the Song dynasty and remains an important part of social etiquette in Chaoshan.

== Teochew opera ==
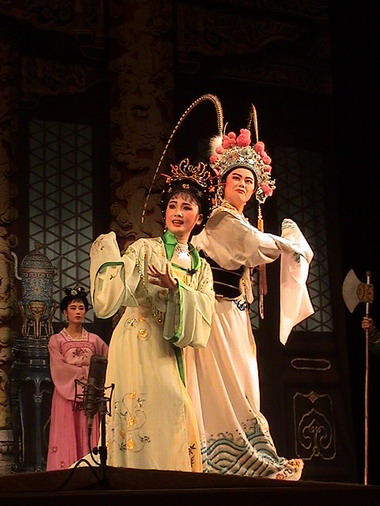
Teochew opera

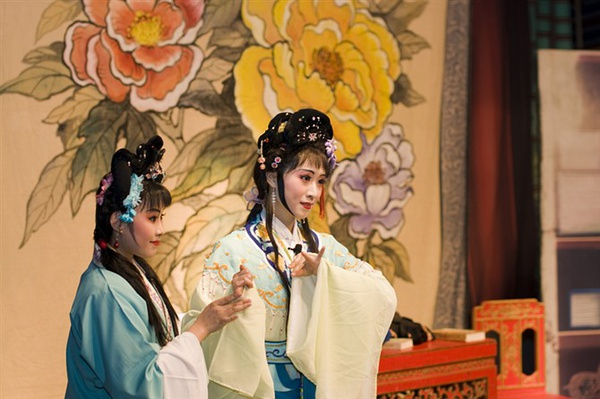
Teochew opera

Teochew opera is a traditional art form that has a history of more than 500 years, and it has been performed in over 20 countries and regions. Based on local folk dances and ballads, Teochew opera has formed its own style under the influence of Nanxi Opera. Nanxi is one of the oldest Chinese operas and originated in the Song dynasty. The old form of choral accompaniment still preserves its distinctive features. Clowns (潮丑) and females are the most distinctive characters in Teochew opera, and fan play and acrobatic skills are prominent.

== Teochew music ==
Teochew music is popular in Chaoshan's teahouse scene. Teochew string music, the gong and drum music, flute music are the traditional musical forms of Teochew music. Teochew string music is made up of mostly plucked and bowed string instruments, and on some occasions, wind instruments are used. The most characteristic instruments are the erxian (or touxian)(二弦，頭弦), tihu (提胡) and yehu (all two-stringed bowed lutes), the sanxian, pipa, ruan, guzheng, and yangqin. The current Teochew drum music is said to be similar to the Drum and Wind Music form of the Han dynasty and Tang dynasty.

== Yingge dance ==
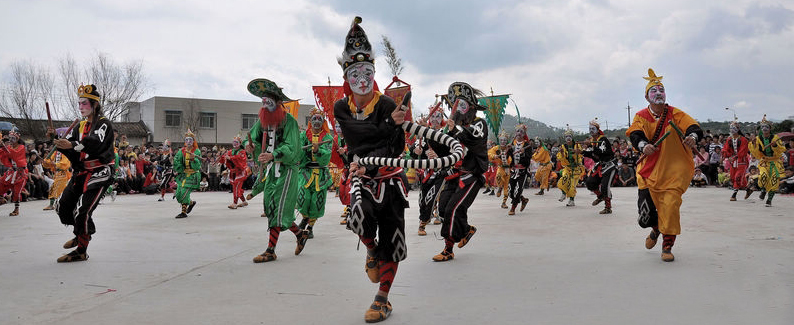
Yingge dance

Yingge dance is a form of Chinese folk dance which started in the Qing dynasty. With a history of more than 300 years, it is a fusion of martial arts and street theater and is regarded as one of the most representative folk arts in Teochew culture.

== Woodcarving ==
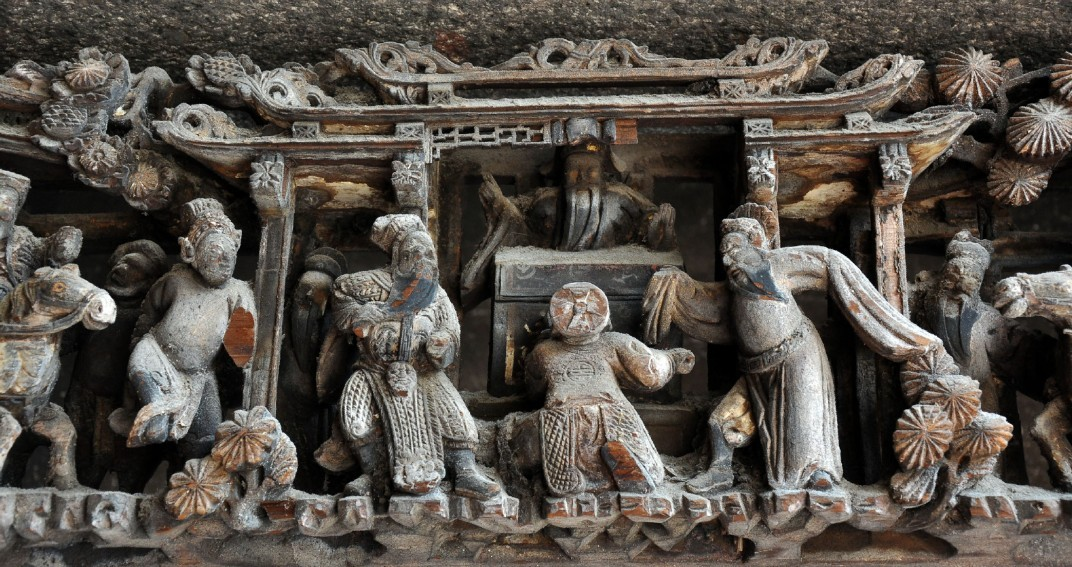
Chaozhou Woodcarving

Teochew woodcarving is one of the oldest carving arts in China, featuring precise and lifelike presentations. Teochew people used a great deal of wood carving in their buildings, especially in temples and ancestral halls.

== Embroidery and porcelain ==
The Chaoshan embroidery is called "three-dimensional painting on silk." A piece can take months of work. The Chaoshan porcelain is also famous for its delicate colors and classic designs.

== Chaoshan houses and attractions ==
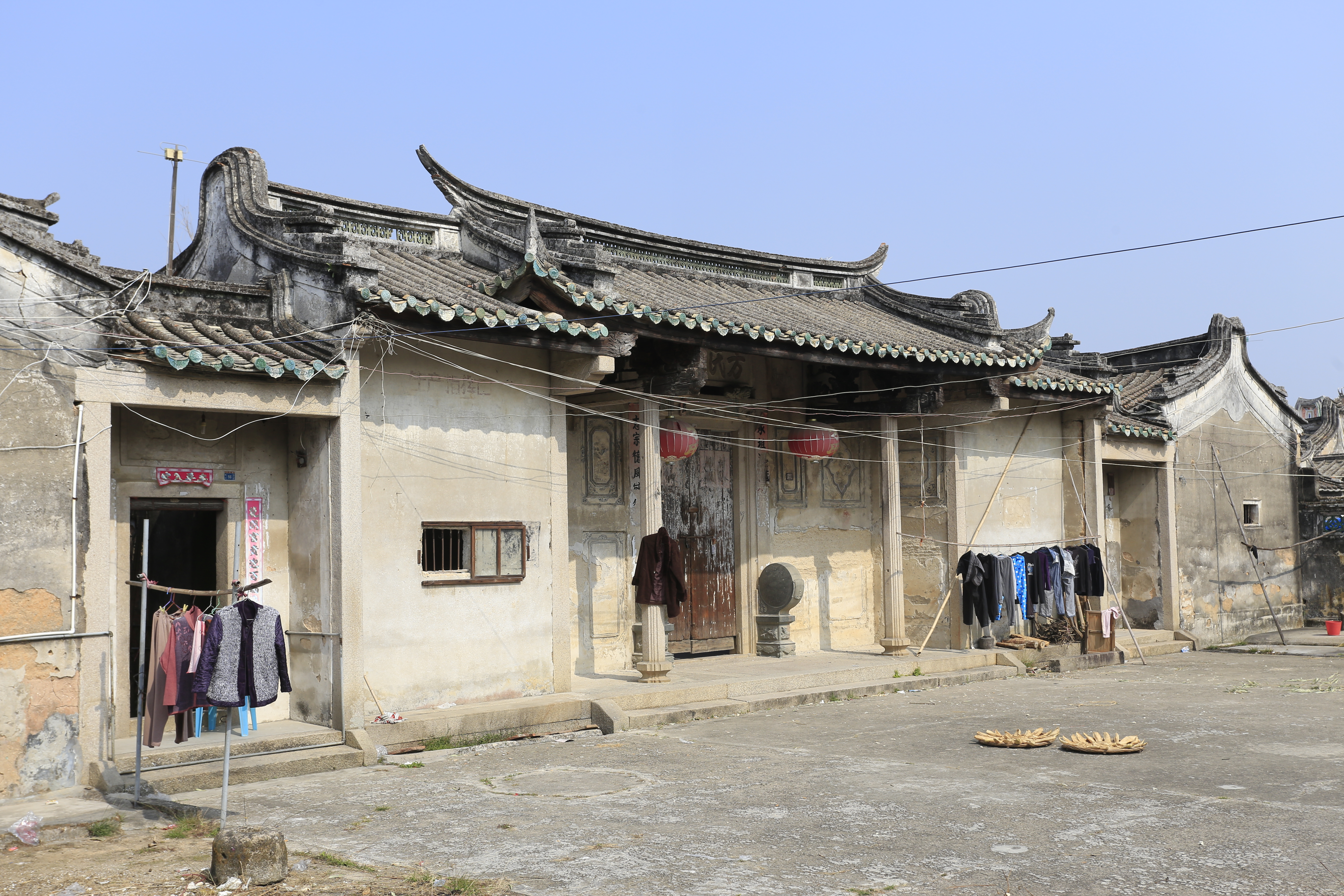
A residential house in Puning

Chaoshan traditional houses are usually composed of rectangular courtyards and rooms to form a "mansion-style" folk house. The buildings are mostly composed of two parts, with an overall layout of "front courtyard and back house". The front part is called "outer courtyard" or "front courtyard". The courtyard surface is rammed with shell lime sand or paved with stone. It is surrounded by walls on three sides. The main building is called "back house", which consists of the main building on the central axis and the symmetrical side rooms on the left and right.

The traditional landmarks and attractions include the Chaozhou Ancient City, Paifang Street, Swatow (Shantou) Old Town, and Nan'ao Island.

== Overseas ==
There are over 10 million Chaoshan people living overseas, mainly in the Southeast Asian countries of Singapore, Malaysia, Thailand, Cambodia, Vietnam, the Philippines, and Indonesia; as well as France, the United States, Canada, New Zealand, etc. They still keep their Chaoshan culture to different degrees.

Overseas Chinese are also known for sending millions of qiaopis (letters with money) to their families back in China, as shown by the film Dear You.

== See also ==
- Chaoshan
- Teochew Deity Parade
- Xia Nanyang
