= Chaoshan embroidery =

Traditional Chinese handicraft

Chaoshan embroidery (simplified Chinese: 潮汕刺绣; traditional Chinese: 潮汕刺繡; pinyin: Cháoshàn Cìxiù), or Chaozhou embroidery, shortname Chao embroidery, is a traditional handicraft of Chaoshan, China. It originated in the Tang dynasty and became well-known in the Ming dynasty and Qing dynasty. As one of the two major branches of Cantonese embroidery, Chaoshan embroidery features full composition, clear texture, gold and silver thread inlays, high supporting ground, strong color, etc. Chaoshan embroidery is among the First Batch of National Intangible Cultural Heritages of China.

== History ==
In the Tang dynasty of China (year 618-907), the Chaoshan embroidery originated in the Chaoshan Reagon in Easton Guangdong Province.

In the Ming dynasty, the style of the Chaoshan embroidery was developed, and specialized production areas were formed.

In the Qing dynasty (1368-1911), Chaoshan embroidery became prosperous and well-known.

In 1915, Chaoshan embroidery won international awards at the Panama-Pacific International Exposition in San Francisco.

In 1982, two Chaoshan embroidery works won gold cups of the China Arts and Crafts Hundred Flowers Awards.

In 2008, Chaoshan embroidery was listed in the First Batch of National Intangible Cultural Heritage .

In 2018, the inaugural Chaozhou International Embroidery Art Biennale was held in Chaozhou. More than 300 designers from Australia, Poland, Denmark, Germany, South Korea, the Netherlands, Canada, USA, Norway, Japan, Sweden and Switzerland etc. attended the activities.

== Characteristics ==
A mixture of gold, silver, and wool threads is used to embroider lively colors on silk cloths.

There are various figures, including traditional dragons, phoenixes, lions, antiques and flowers.

Modern Chaoshan embroidery also includes abstract and geometric patterns, as well as contemporary figures.

There are over 200 different stitches used in Chaoshan embroidery.

Some universities in China offer courses on Chaoshan embroidery. It takes three months at least to cultivate a qualified embroiderer.

The most unique technique is the Dingjin embroidery. Firstly, some cotton wool is put on the embroidery floor, which may be more than one inch high. Then velvet thread is used to make the embroidery look like a relief, of 3D visual aesthetics, or "sculpture on textile".

== Chaoshan Drawnwork ==
Chaoshan drawnwork is an art product combining foreign Drawn thread work with Chaoshan embroidery. The warp or weft threats are cut and pulled out from the pattern areas of the fabric (such as cotton, linen, French silk, glass yarn) according to a pre-designed pattern, followed by connecting and repairing the remaining parts with embroidery threads. The patterns of Chaoshan Drawnwork are traditionally flowers, grasses, dragons, and phoenixes, etc. There are more than forty types of products, such as tablecloths, bed sheets and pillowcase sets, and hand towels.

In 2014, Chaoshan Drawwork was listed in the Fourth Batch of the National Intangible Cultural Heritage List of China, with the heritage number of VII-112.

== Glass Yarnwork ==
A glass yarn base is a thin, plain-weave fabric made of fine, strong twisted yarn. It is called glass yarn because of its high transparency. Colored threads can be used to embroider floral patterns and other designs onto the semi-transparent fabric using techniques such as flat embroidery, padding embroidery, ground embroidery, and appliqué.

== See also ==
- Chaoshan culture
- Cantonese embroidery
- Chinese embroidery
