= Chaoshan traditional houses =

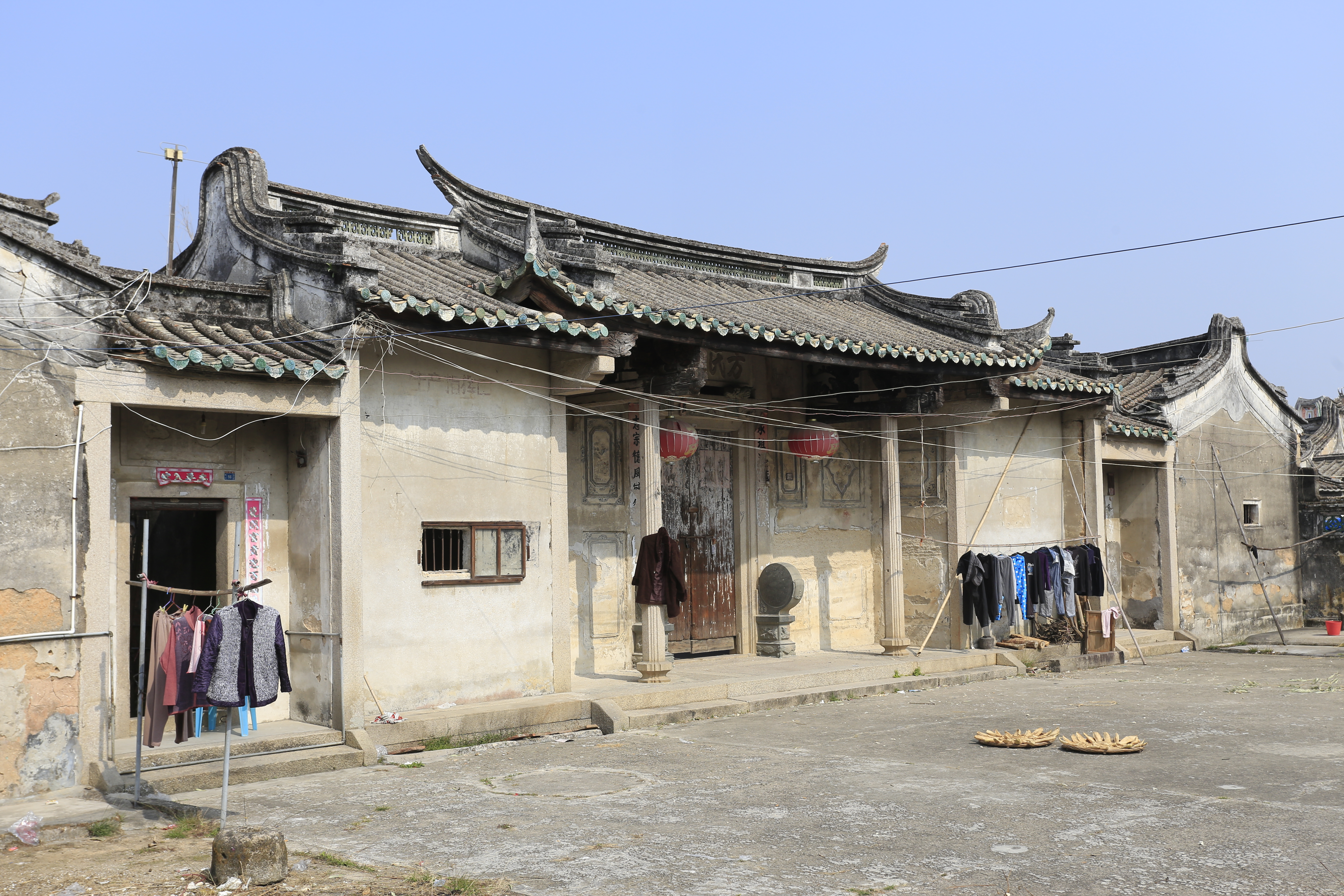
A residential house in Puning

Chaoshan traditional houses (Chinese: 潮汕民居; pinyin: Cháoshàn mínjū), also known as Chaoshan folk houses or shortly Chaoshan houses, refer to the traditional folk houses in the Chaoshan region of eastern Guangdong Province of China. They represent an important part of Chaoshan culture. The basic forms of Chaoshan traditional houses include the "Bamboo Pole House", "Downhill Tiger House", "Four-Point Gold Houses", "Four-Horse Cart House", and "Hundred-Room House".

The ancient architectural techniques of Chaoshan were included in the National Intangible Cultural Heritage Representative List in 2021.

== History ==
In the Tang dynasty of China (year 618-907), the architectural techniques of Chaoshan ancient buildings originated in the Chaoshan Reagon in Easton Guangdong Province.

During the Song dynasty, the The Xu Imperial Son-in-Law Mansion was built in the present Chaozhou City. It has 55 halls and rooms, 11 courtyards and 2 lanes.

In the Ming dynasty, the traditional houses were developed.

In the late Qing dynasty and early Republican era, Chaoshan folk house construction reached its peak. During this period, millions of Chaoshan people went overseas to start businesses in Southeast Asia. Many of them then returned to their hometowns to build mansions, and elevated the architecture of Teochew houses to a higher level.

In 2021, the ancient architectural techniques of Chaoshan were included in the National Intangible Cultural Heritage Representative Units List.

== Forms and styles ==
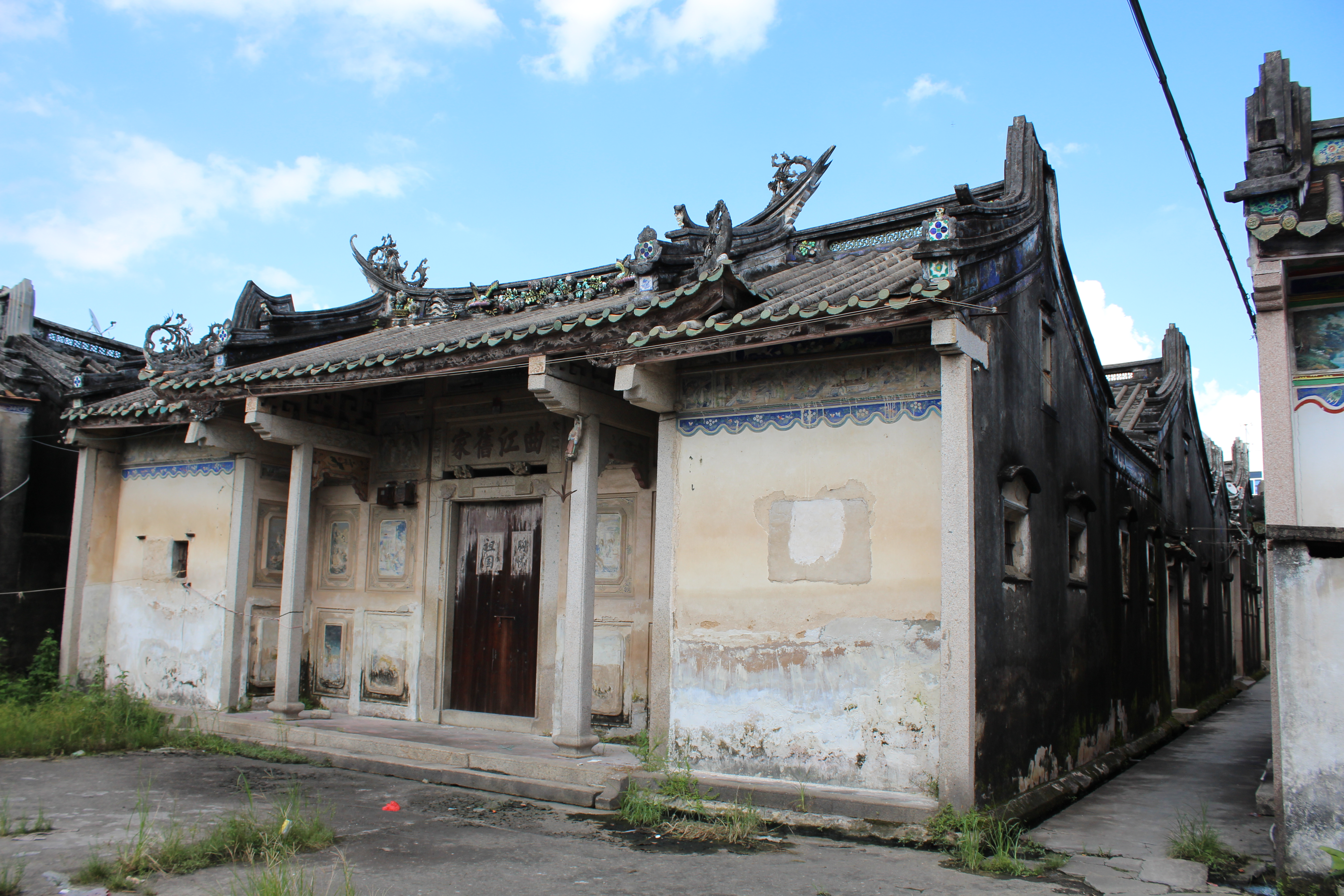
A residential house in Puning

The basic forms of Chaoshan traditional houses include the "Bamboo Pole House", "Downhill Tiger House", "Four-Point Gold Houses", "Four-Horse Cart House", and "Hundred-Room House" (Hundred Birds Paying Homage to the Phoenix).

The Bamboo Pole House (竹竿厝) is a row of section houses. A single-story house of one living room and two bedrooms (or just of one big room) is one section, and multiple sections are connected in a row to form a "Bamboo Pole Houses". The span is not large, and the structure is simple.

The Downhill Tiger (or Descending Tiger) House (下山虎) has a main room (hall), with two big rooms on the left and right. There is a patio (courtyard) in front, and a wing (small) room on each side. In the further front, there is a wall with a gate. The house is named for its tiger-like shape: The gate in the front is considered to be the mouth of the tiger, the two wing rooms the front paws, the back hall the belly, and the two big rooms on each side of the hall the hind paws.

The Four-Point Gold House (四點金) is formed by adding one hall and two side bedrooms to the front of the Down Hill Tiger. It is a square, nine-square grid structure, divided into front and rear sections. The front section contains a gatehouse or front hall, with a room on either side. The rear section is the main hall and two large rooms on either side. A courtyard with two wing rooms connects the front and rear sections. There is a side doorway leading to the outside between the wing rooms and the rear big rooms. The house is named for its four gable walls resembling element "gold".

The Four-Horse Cart House (驷马拖车) consists of a three-fold main house, surrounded by four smaller four-point-gold houses. It features a front courtyard, a rear courtyard. And a row of room at the back encloses the whole building. It is a large-scale architectural complex with complete facilities.

The "Hundred-Room House" (百间厝), also known as the "Hundred Birds Paying Homage to the Phoenix" (百鸟朝凰), consists of a main building with three houses, surrounded by approximately 100 rooms of smaller houses, forming a large mansion.

In addition to the types mentioned above, Chaoshan traditional houses also include "five-room houses", "seven-room houses" and "nine dragons spitting pearls".

== Architectural features ==
Chaoshan folk houses inherit the traditional courtyard house styles of the China Central Plains and Southern Fujian, combined with the local climate and environment. The buildings are mostly composed of two parts, with an overall layout of "front courtyard and back house". The front part is called "outer courtyard" or "front courtyard". The courtyard surface is rammed with shell lime sand or paved with stone. The main building is called "back house", which consists of the hall on the central axis and the symmetrical side houses on the left and right.

The residential architecture of Chaozhou generally shares the following characteristics:

- There is one or more courtyards (patios) enclosed by rooms. In the case of two or three courtyards, each rises in elevation;
- The main gates often face south or east, so as to block the cold north wind in winter and receive the cool south wind in summer.
- Often decorated with wood carvings, stone carvings, and inlaid porcelain (in modern times, calligraphy, paintings, and porcelain sculptures are more common).
- Bright hall, dark rooms. The hall is for receiving guests, while the rooms are private spaces for individuals, especially women.
- Stone and wood structure with shell lime sand rammed earth walls
- The floor of the outer areas is made of shell line sand. The indoor floor is paved with red bricks.
- Shops in Chaozhou are often "arcade-style" buildings, a characteristic of the rainy south.

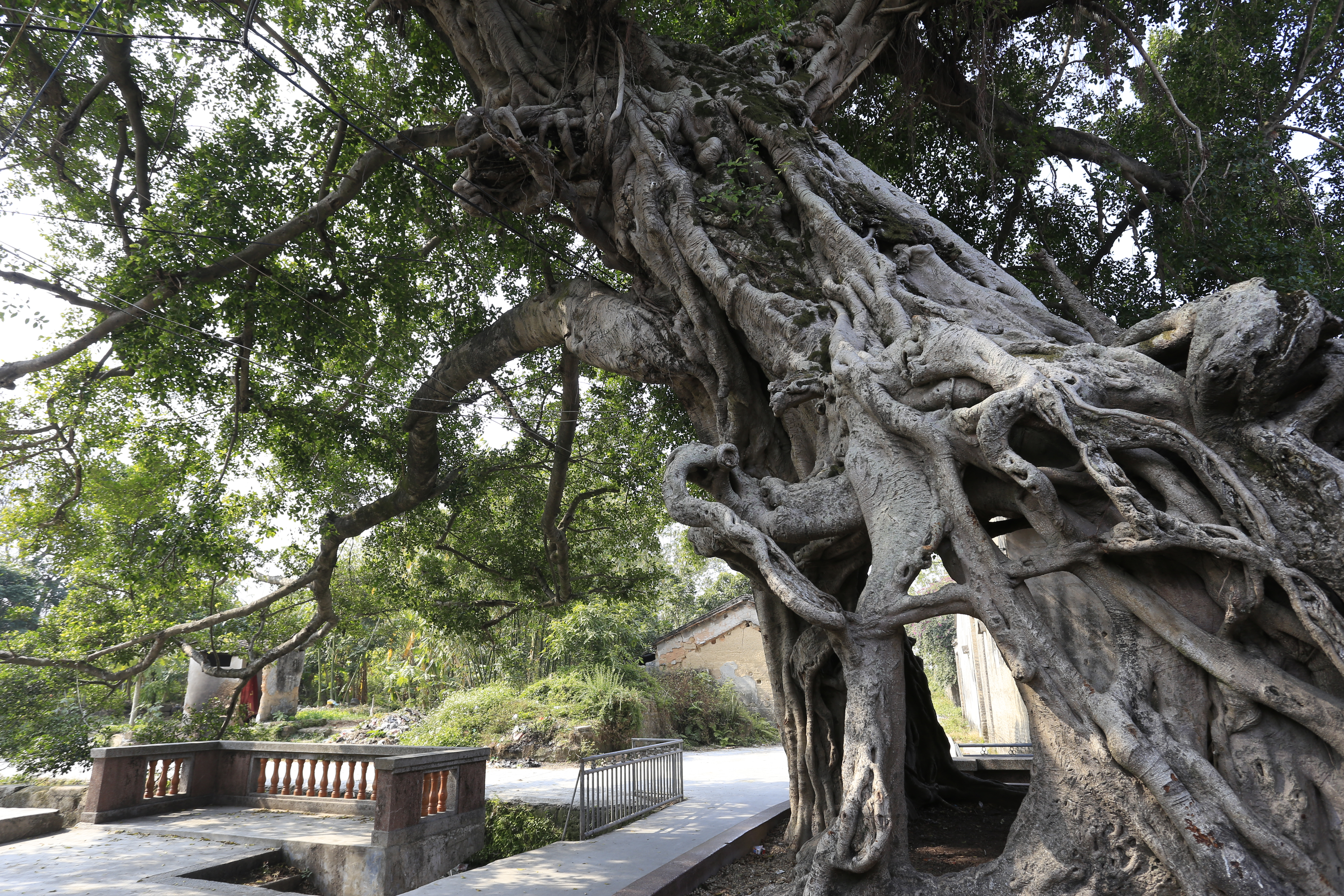
Banyan Tree at Qiaotou, Hongyang Town, Puning

- Chaoshan people often live in clan-based communities, as is reflected in the village architecture, which is a walled village pattern centered around the clan's ancestral hall. Banyan trees are often planted at village entrances and along roadsides, symbolizing a spirit of striving upwards, and their drooping roots symbolize the wish to return to one's roots.

In terms of both architectural layout and decorative craftsmanship, Chaoshan houses can rival palaces. Hence the sayings "The Imperial Palace of Chaozhou" and "Imperial Palaces of the Capital, Homes of Ordinary Chaoshan Residents".

== Gable walls ==
The gable walls of Chaoshan houses are classified according to the five elements they resemble. The gable wall of element "metal" has a large arc, the gable wall of "wood" is characterized by a narrow and high arc, the gable wall of "water" is composed of three to five arcs at the top, the gable wall of "fire" has acute angles, and the gable wall of "earth" has a flat top.

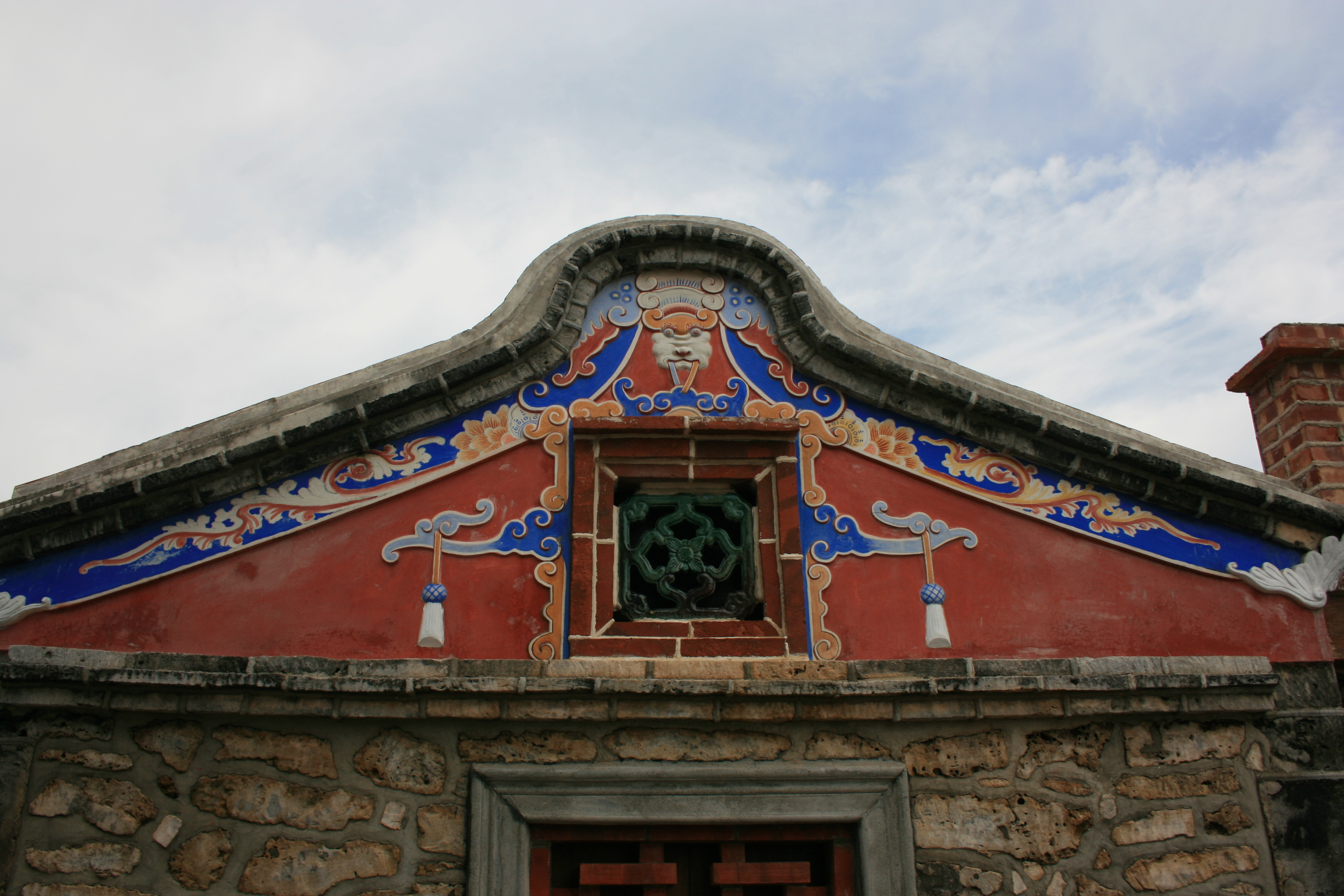
Gable wall of element "metal"

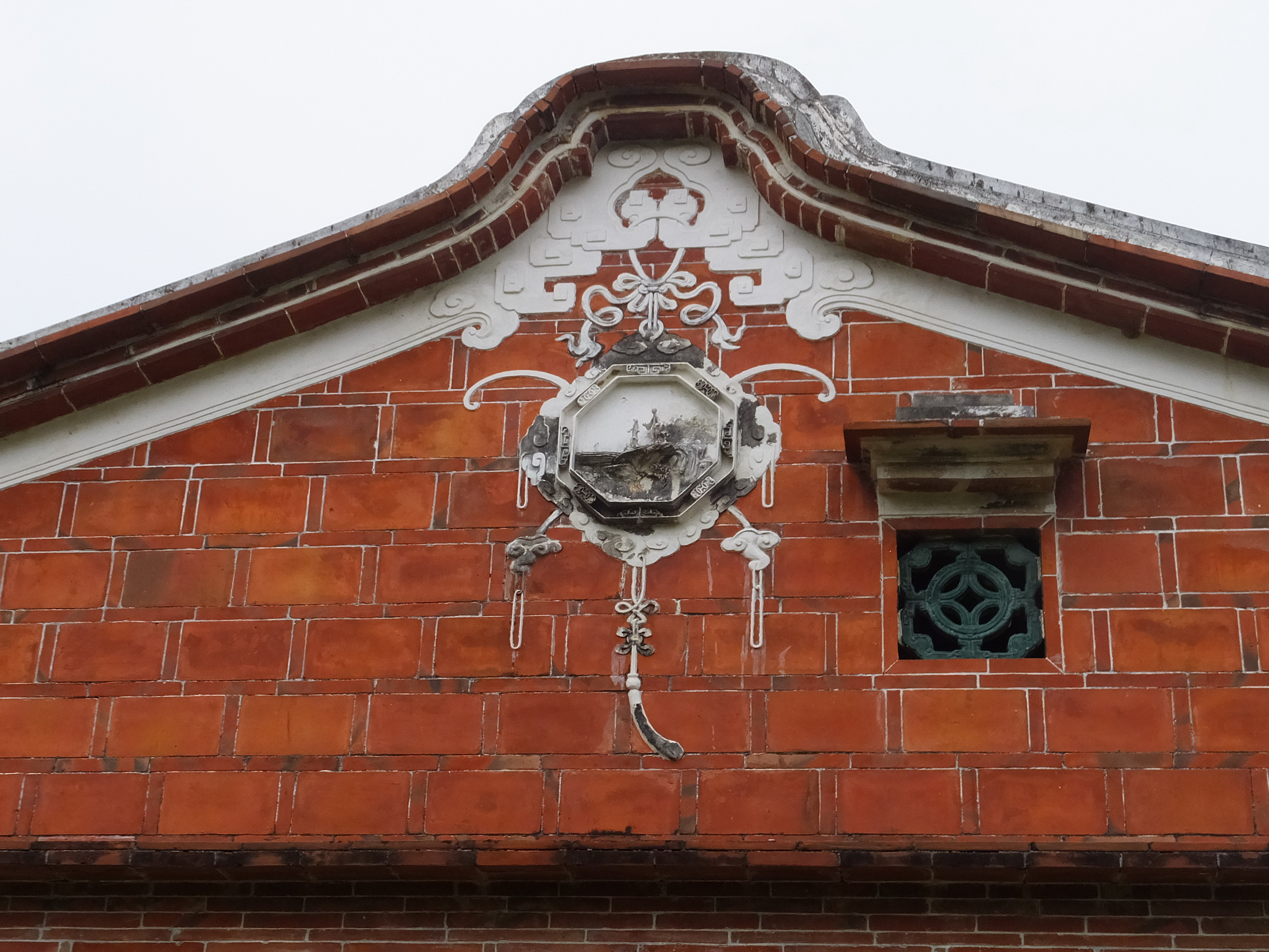
Gable wall of element "water"

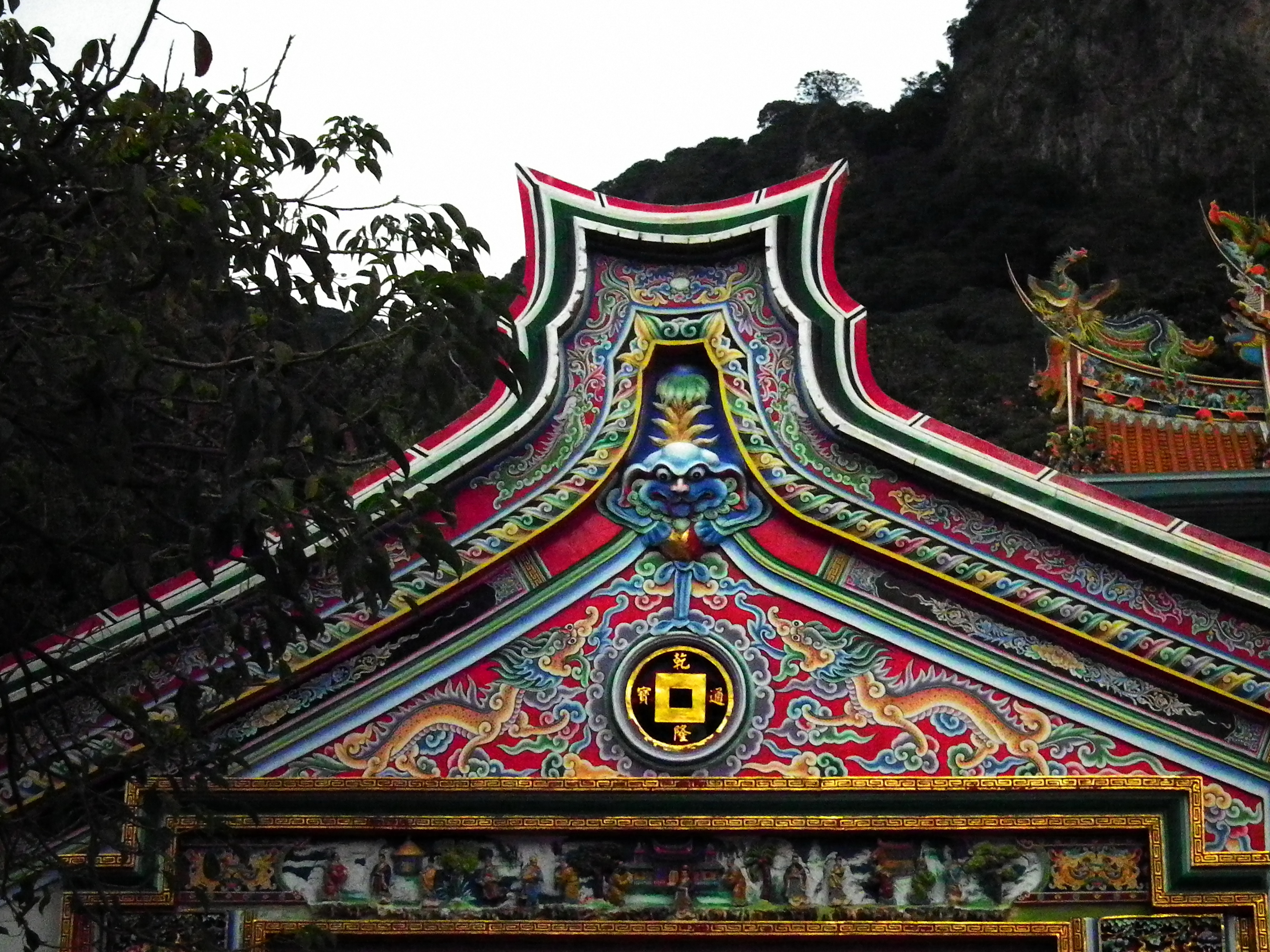
Gable wall of element "fire"

== See also ==
- Chaoshan culture
