= Teochew Deity Parade =

Folk festival in China

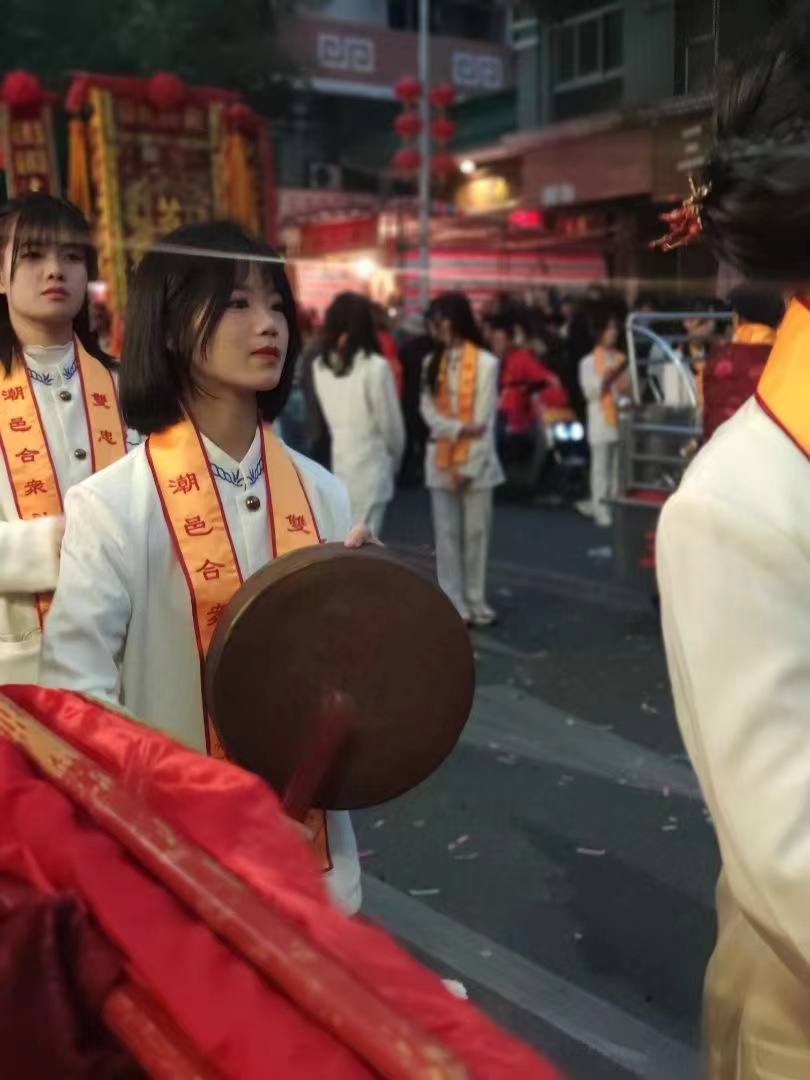
Teochew Gong‑and‑Drum Performances in Teochew Deity Parade

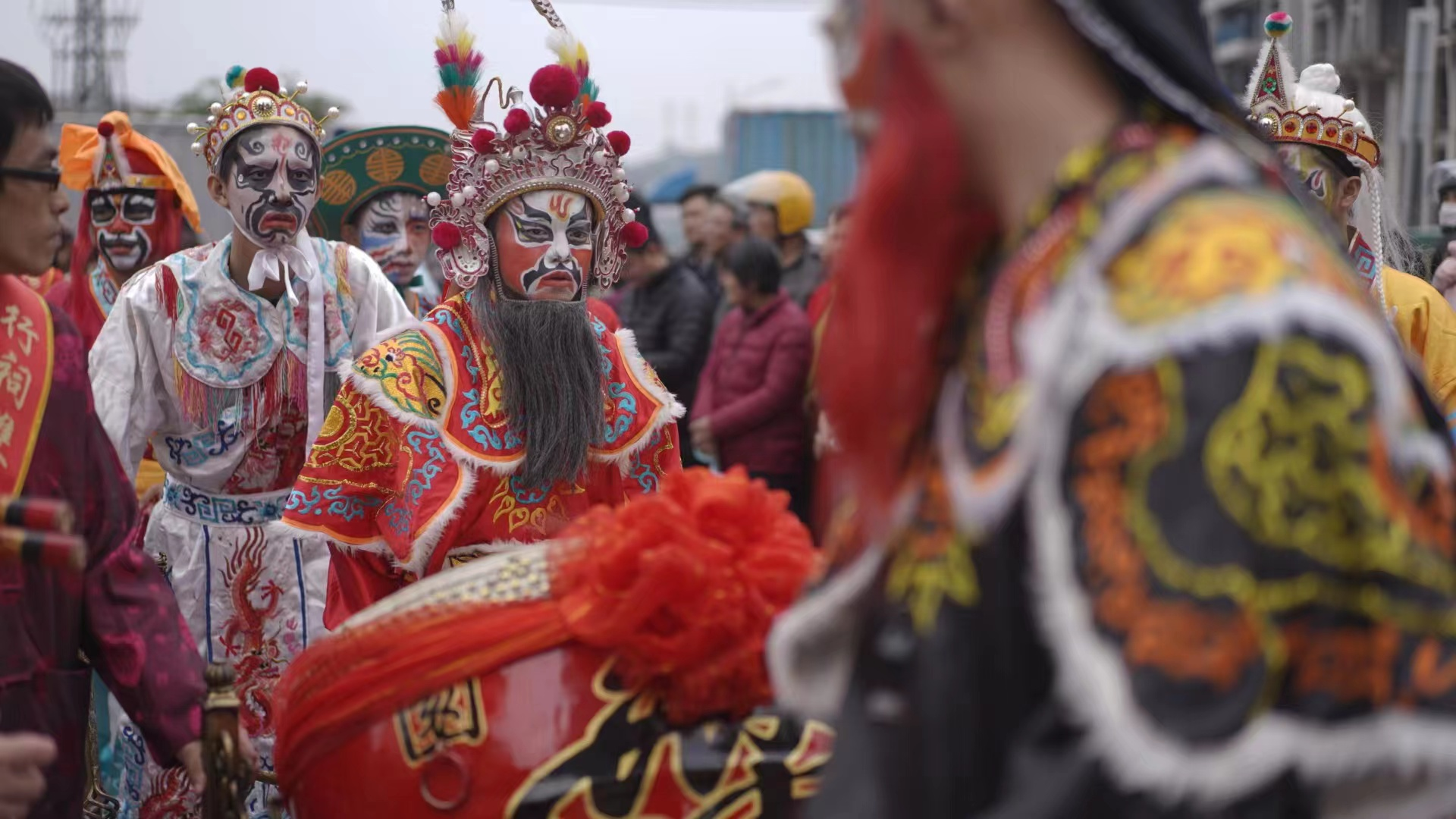
Yingge Dance

Teochew Deity Parade (營老爺; Teochew: iâng^{2} ló^{5}‑iâ^{5}; lit. The Deity Touring Its Territory) is an extremely grand, community-based, and ritualistic folk festival in the Teochew region (Chaoshan), combining local deity worship and land worship. The main purpose of Teochew Deity Parade is to invite local guardian deities to patrol their jurisdiction, ensuring peace, blessings, and protection from evil, and allowing the people to pray for village safety and good weather. The procession for Teochew Deity Parade is extremely large, including flag teams, banner teams, palanquin bearers, Yingge dance troupes, lion dance teams, Song Jiang Battle Array (宋江陣; Teochew: sông^{3} giong^{1}‑dêng^{7}), Eight Generals troupe (家將陣; Teochew: ga^{1} ziong^{3}‑dêng^{7}), and drum bands, and is hailed as a "Chaoshan carnival."

== Background ==
Teochew Deity Parades originated from earth‑god worship and village protective deity rituals that developed during the Ming dynasty (1368–1644) and continued as a major rural ritual until the mid‑20th century. The activities were shaped by the migration of Teochew ancestors from the Central Plains and their integration with local Min‑Yue cultures. Over time, the parade became a major communal festival expressing protection, prosperity, and collective identity.

=== Earth‑god Worship ===
The parade evolved from Bogong (伯公) and earth‑god worship, a community‑based ritual where the deity "patrols" the land to bless crops and protect the settlement. Ancient Chinese earth‑god worship already appears in Shang dynasty oracle bones, showing the deep antiquity of the concept.

== Main deities ==
=== Big Deity ===
Main article: Dark Heavenly Highest Deity

In the Chaoshan region and overseas Teochew communities, the "Big Deity" or the "Great Lord" (大老爺; Teochew: tāi^{7} ló^{5}‑iâ^{5}; lit. Big Deity) referred to in the Teochew Deity Parade ceremony is Dark Heavenly Highest Deity (玄天上帝; Teochew: Hiang^{5} tiêng^{1} siang^{6} di^{3}; Mandarin: Xuantian Shangdi). The Deity also called Highest Deity (上帝公; Taiwanese Minnan: Siōng‑tè‑kong) by Taiwanese, and the True Martial Great Emperor (真武大帝; Zhenwu Dadi) by people from Northern China. Big Deity is regarded as the supreme guardian deity by the Teochew people, especially in large towns such as Jieyang, the ancient city of Chaozhou and Teochew people in South-East Asia, such as Thailand. The Teochew people believe that Big Deity is an imperial deity who rules over all the gods of the north, the god of all gods, possessing supreme authority and immense power to ward off disasters, eliminate demons, exorcise evil spirits, suppress fire and water, and ensure national peace and prosperity. Temples to Big Deity are ubiquitous in the Teochew region, and the Teochew people call these temples "Da Lao Ye Gong" (大老爺宮; Teochew: dua^{7} lao^{6} ia^{5} gêng^{1}; lit. Big Deity Temple) or "Lao Ye Gong" (老爺宮; lit. Deity Temple). Every year in the first month of the lunar calendar, grand Deity Parades are held in various towns and villages of the Chaoshan region and many Teochew communities oversea. The statue of Big Deity is taken out of the temple and tours the area, praying for his protection and peace.

=== Lords of the Three Mountains ===
Main article: Lords of the Three Mountains

According to traditional accounts, the Three Mountain Kings (三山國王) are the most representative local guardian deities of the Chaoshan region. Unlike the large urban temples, it is the inland and upland villages that regard the Three Mountain Kings as their closest and most authoritative protectors. The cult is said to have originated in Lintian of Jieyang during the Sui dynasty, where the deities were originally the spirits of three mountains — Jin Mountain (巾山), Ming Mountain (明山), and Du Mountain (獨山) — later personified as three royal figures. In the fourteenth year of the Yuanhe reign (819 CE), when Han Yu was exiled to serve as Prefect of Teochew, he encountered severe flooding. He prayed to the "Three Mountain Gods," renowned for answering petitions concerning drought, flood, and epidemic. The rain soon ceased. Following this event, the mountain gods were elevated from local spirits to the principal territorial deities of Teochew Prefecture, becoming the foremost gods of the Teochew region. Over time, they came to be regarded as the protectors of both Hakka and Teochew communities across the three Chaoshan cities. As Teochew, Hakka, and Haifeng–Lufeng migrants moved abroad, the cult spread to Taiwan, Hong Kong, and Southeast Asia. The Three Mountain Kings’ festival is typically held on the twenty‑fifth day of the second lunar month. Teochew people believe that the deities safeguard the land and its inhabitants and possess the power to ensure timely winds and rains.

=== City God ===
Main article: City God

In Teochew belief, the City God (城隍爺; Teochew: sian^{5} ng^{5} ia^{5}, or 城隍公; Teochew: sian^{5} ng^{5} gong^{1}) is regarded as the "chief administrator of the underworld." He is the spiritual counterpart of the local magistrate in the human realm, functioning as the prefectural or county‑level official of the spirit world, and holds the highest rank in prefectural and county rituals.

Within Teochew folk religion, the City God’s Inspection Tour (城隍出巡), also called City God’s Governance Tour (城隍出政), is an important traditional ritual event. The most solemn form is the Three Inspection Rites (三巡會), sometimes referred to as Three Governance Tours (三出政). These three major inspections take place annually during Qingming Festival, Ghost Festival, and the Tenth Lunar New Moon (The first day of the Tenth Lunar Month). The core meaning of the Three Inspection Rites is expressed in the paired concepts "Joint Governance of Yin and Yang" (陰陽共治) and "Purifying and Regulating the Jurisdiction" (清行轄區), phrases commonly inscribed on plaques or couplets in City God temples. These ideas reflect the City God’s dual role as both judicial and administrative authority across the realms of the living and the dead. The concept of "Joint Governance of Yin and Yang" means that the City God oversees not only the moral order, ethics, and social discipline of the living (the yang realm), but also the judgment of departed souls (the yin realm). He therefore embodies both a protective deity and a judicial deity. "Purifying and Regulating the Jurisdiction" refers to the City God’s duty to enforce justice within his domain — maintaining social order, correcting misconduct, rectifying abuses, and ensuring that good is rewarded and wrongdoing receives its due consequence. Through these inspections, the City God symbolically reaffirms the harmony and proper governance of the community.

== Other deities ==
=== Double Loyal Lords ===
In the Chaoshan region, the Double Loyal Lords (雙忠公) refer to Zhang Xun and Xu Yuan, two Tang‑dynasty figures celebrated for their steadfast defense of Suiyang during the An Lushan Rebellion. Over a siege that lasted nearly ten months, they held the city against overwhelming odds until they were finally captured and executed. To the people of Chaoshan, the two men embody loyalty, righteousness, and protective guardianship, and are revered as deities who safeguard the land and its inhabitants. Although their cult generally ranks below that of "Big Deity", the Three Mountain Kings, and the City God, in certain core areas—most notably Chaoyang—the Double Loyal Lords are honored as the principal tutelary deities, regarded locally as the foremost "Great Lords" of the community.

=== Beh-Gong, the Earth God ===
Main article: Tudigong

In the Chaoshan region, Beh-Gong (伯公), also known as the Earth God (土地公, aka Tudigong), is regarded as the most grassroots of all tutelary deities. He protects very specific local spaces, such as a plot of land, a village boundary, or even an individual grave. Although major festivals are typically led by higher‑ranking deities, Beh-Gong, as the "landlord deity," also takes part in the procession. In some villages, there are ritual events dedicated specifically to beh-gong, including the well‑known Immersing Beh-Gong (浸伯公; Teochew: zim bêh‑gong) which is a distinctive Chaoshan ritual—especially in Jiexi—where villagers immerse the Earth God’s palanquin in water to pray for rain, purification, and agricultural harmony. Beyond the fixed annual date, often the fifteenth day of the first lunar month, Immersing Beh-Gong may also be performed during severe droughts or when crops fail. If ordinary incense‑offering prayers prove ineffective, worshippers in Jiexi may adopt a "half‑reverent, half‑coercive" approach, urging Beh-Gong to work harder and to fulfill his responsibilities. This reflects the pragmatic ethos of Chaoshan folk religion: a deity who receives worship must, in turn, protect the community. During Immersing Beh-Gong, villagers carry the Earth God’s statue out of the shrine and bring it to a nearby river, pond, or stream. The palanquin—sometimes together with the statue—is immersed in the water, symbolizing purification, the washing away of defilements, and prayers for timely rain and agricultural abundance.

=== Southern Pole Great Emperor ===
Main article: Old Man of the South Pole

In Taoist doctrine, the Southern Pole Great Emperor (南極大帝), also known as the Great Emperor of Longevity, is distinct from the Southern Pole Immortal Elder (南極仙翁, aka Old Man of the South Pole), who is also called the God of Longevity or the Southern Pole Star Lord. Southern Pole Great Emperor — formally titled The High and Supreme Divine King of the Jade‑Pure Heaven, the Great Emperor of Longevity (高上神霄玉清真王長生大帝) — is one of Taoism’s Four Sovereigns. By contrast, Southern Pole Immortal Elder originates from ancient star‑deity worship and is depicted as a kindly old man with a high forehead, white beard, staff, and peach of immortality, often accompanied by a crane or a spotted deer.

However, because both deities bear the name "Southern Pole" and are associated with longevity, Chaoshan folk religion does not distinguish between them. Whether during the Teochew Deity Parade or in temple worship, the two figures are blended into a single deity, commonly referred to as Southern Pole Great Emperor or the God of Longevity (壽星). When Chaoshan communities parade Southern Pole Great Emperor, they do so to pray for health, long life, household peace, and general blessings, as well as for protection against malevolent forces and for favourable weather and communal safety. Although Southern Pole Great Emperor is not as commonly paraded as major deities such as the Three Mountain Kings, in villages or temples where he is the principal deity—or one of the co‑worshipped deities — rituals for parading Southern Pole Great Emperor are included in the Teochew Deity Parade festivities.

=== Guandi ===
Main article: Guan Yu

Within the pantheon of deities featured in the Teochew Deity Parade, Guandi is one of the participating deities. Yet in the wider religious life of Teochew communities, both in China and overseas, Guandi occupies a particularly distinguished position. He is at once a martial deity, a god of wealth, and the very embodiment of loyalty and righteousness, functioning as an all‑purpose guardian. As a martial protector, Guandi drives away malevolent forces and safeguards the community. As a patron of commerce, his reputation for integrity leads Teochew merchants to regard him as the guardian of legitimate wealth; business openings and major transactions are believed to require his blessing. As a clan and diaspora deity, Guandi serves as a moral anchor, representing the ethical ideals that bind Teochew people together across the world.

=== Mazu ===
Main article: Mazu

Mazu (媽祖; Teochew: Ma^{5}‑zu^{2}), also known as the Heavenly Empress (天后聖母) or the Celestial Mother (天后), is regarded by the Teochew people as the foremost and most approachable of all goddesses, embodying powerful maternal protection. For this reason, even Teochew communities that are not engaged in fishing worship Mazu as part of their broader "mother‑goddess tradition" (母神信仰). Along the coastal regions, the number of Mazu temples and devotees even surpasses those of Big Deity; she is one of the very few female deities whose influence stands on equal footing with, or even exceeds, that of major male tutelary gods. In everyday speech, she is affectionately called Ng‑ma (Teochew: n̂g^{5}‑ma^{5}) or Mazu‑po. In coastal ports such as Shantou, Dahao, and Zhanglin, the parading of Mazu seeks her blessings for safe voyages, abundant catches, smooth maritime trade, unimpeded transport of goods, and flourishing prosperity. During the procession, Mazu is typically seated in the most elaborately decorated palanquin, accompanied by a flower‑basket troupe, while her two guardian generals — General far‑sight (千里眼; Teochew: chian^{1}‑li^{2}‑ngê^{5}; lit. eyes that see a thousand miles) and General Super‑Hearing (順風耳; Teochew: sung^{7}‑hong^{1}‑hī^{2}; lit. ears that follow the wind) — stand watch. The atmosphere created by the banner and escort teams differs markedly from the solemn majesty of Big Deity’s procession, leaning instead toward joy, benevolence, and maternal grace.

=== The Sage King of Anji ===
Main article: Ang Chee Sia Ong

The Sage King of Anji ( 安濟聖王, aka Ang Chee Sia Ong in Singapore) —also known as the Numinous King of Anji (安濟靈王) or Lord Qinglong (青龍爺; lit. Lord Green Dragon) — is a highly influential river deity associated with the Han River in Chaozhou. He is revered as the protector of the river’s waterways and the guardian of the communities along its banks. His principal place of worship is the Qinglong Ancient Temple (青龍古廟), also called the Temple of the Sage King of Anji, located on the southern embankment of the Han River.

The temple was first established during the Song dynasty and originally enshrined the Water Dragon King. In the Ming dynasty, local scholars incorporated Wang Kang, the Shu Han prefect of Yongchang from the Three Kingdoms period, as the temple’s main deity. Because he was believed to have subdued the river’s waters, the people later honored him with the title Sage King of Anji. The temple’s statue of the Sage King is carved from nanmu wood, stands eight chi tall, and is depicted wearing a crown and dragon robe. Each year in the first lunar month, the Qinglong Ancient Temple holds a deity parade, during which residents come to obtain "dragon‑whisker holy water" (龍鬚聖水) for protection and good fortune. Among the people of Chaozhou, there is also a folk belief that worshipping the Sage King of Anji can bring success in gambling. This derives from a popular local tale: the Sage King became enamored of the wife of Zhenjun‑ye of the Zhenjun Temple and challenged him to a gambling contest known as a huahui. After losing several rounds and unable to repay his enormous debts, Zhenjun‑ye was compelled to offer his wife as collateral. The second wife, attracted by the Sage King’s wealth and status, willingly followed him and eventually became his consort. This story is the origin of the Sage King’s legendary "Second Lady" (二夫人).

=== Others ===
In Teochew Deity Parade, the pantheon sometimes includes local or folk‑created deities, such as the following:

Five‑Grain Deity

Main article: Shennong

The Teochew worship of the Five‑Grain Deity is deeply rooted in the region’s agricultural heritage and derives from ancient reverence for Shennong, the Divine Farmer. In Chaoshan, the deity is known as Lord of the Five Grains (五穀爺) or Mother of the Five Grains (五穀母). He or she is depicted holding a stalk of rice, symbolizing abundance and the protection of agriculture and food supply. Teochew communities worship the Five‑Grain Lord on the fifteenth day of the tenth lunar month (十成節; Teochew: Zap^{8} Siann^{1} Zoih^{4}; lit. the Festival of Full Harvest), and the Five‑Grain Mother on the fifth and nineteenth of each lunar month. On these days, farmers fill a rice canister with white rice and paste red paper on it to serve as a temporary spirit tablet. In the Chaoyang area, farmers instead hang an image of Shennong on the household shrine.

Emperor Huaguang

Main article: Huaguang Dadi

The cult of Emperor Huaguang originated in Fuqing and spread to the Chaoshan region through migration. Also known as the Great Numinous Officer of the Five Manifestations (五顯靈官大帝), Marshal Ma (馬靈官), Heavenly Lord Ma (馬天君), Three‑Eyed Huaguang (三眼華光), or Huaguang Dadi (華光大帝), he is a deity in Taoism and folk religion revered as a fire god who governs the essence of fire. With his three eyes, he discerns good and evil and subdues demons. He is one of the Four Great Marshal‑Protectors under the Big Deity. Among Teochew communities in China and overseas, Huaguang worship is especially prominent in the opera profession, the construction trade, and the craft of paper effigy making. His birthday falls on the twenty‑eighth day of the ninth lunar month, when temples hold grand celebrations.

Sage King of Kai‑Zhang

Main article: Tan Goan-kong

Tan Goan-kong (陳元光), a brilliant Tang‑dynasty scholar‑general, is revered as the Sage King of Kai‑Zhang. He pacified the indigenous uprisings in southern Fujian and established stable governance in the Zhangzhou region. His cult is particularly respected among Teochew people whose ancestors migrated from Zhangzhou.

== Core procedure ==
The core procedure of the Teochew Deity Parade procession can be broadly divided into three major stages: preparation and invitation of the deity, the Procession and Worship, and finally the Returning.

=== Preparation ===
Because the procession involves many participants and complex coordination, the preparatory phase is crucial. It includes selecting an auspicious time, raising funds, confirming the ritual sequence, publicity, personnel assignments, rehearsals, logistics, and arranging offerings. The key steps are as follows:

==== Selecting an auspicious time ====
The first task is choosing an auspicious date. In Chaoshan villages, this is usually handled by specialists known as date‑selecting master (擇日先生; lit. Mr. Date‑Selecting) or Feng shui master (地理先生), who are well‑versed in the Tung Shing, calendrical systems, the Five Elements (五行), Four Pillars of Destiny (八字), and geomancy. They avoid dates that clash with the major surnames of the village and propose several suitable options for the deity to decide upon. The final decision is made through divination with sacred crescent blocks (跋杯; Teochew: buah^{8} buê^{1}). Village elders and the temple attendant lead the ritual: incense is offered, the proposed dates are presented, and the blocks are cast before the deity. If the result is "one flat, one convex", it means divine approval (勝筶; lit. winning blocks). Both flat means the deity withholds a clear answer (笑筶; lit. laughing blocks). Both convex means divine disapproval (哭筶; lit. crying blocks). Once the deity confirms the auspicious date and hour, all subsequent preparations may proceed. When preparations are complete, the community performs ritual purification and begins the process of inviting the deity.

==== Ritual bathing and vesting ====
In the Teochew Deity Parade tradition, ritual bathing is a solemn act of purification before the deity goes on procession. Villagers clean the statue and dress it in fresh ceremonial robes. Since most images are carved from wood or molded from clay, the “bathing” is symbolic rather than literal. A basin of water is prepared with pomegranate leaves or smilax leaves. A new cloth is dipped into the infused water and used to gently wipe the face and body of the statue, symbolizing the removal of worldly dust. After cleansing, the deity is vested in newly made silk robes—typically in bright red and gold—often donated by villagers as an act of devotion. Depending on the deity’s rank, the statue may also be adorned with a new hat or crown, a belt, and sometimes real gold ornaments contributed by worshippers. The old robes are either kept as sacred relics or ritually burned (sent to the heavens), ensuring they are not profaned.

==== The Palanquin ====
This stage involves respectfully removing the deity’s image from its shrine and placing it onto a richly decorated palanquin in preparation for the procession. The ritual is led by the temple attendant and village elders. Strong young men lift the deity from the shrine and carry it to the palanquin, which is then placed in the village’s designated "divine ground" (神場／宮埕／老爺場), usually the open square in front of the temple or ancestral hall. This marks the formal beginning of the event and symbolizes the deity’s descent from the shrine to begin inspecting the human realm. Because temple interiors are often cramped, the deity is temporarily placed on a raised platform in the open space so that worshippers may safely offer incense. Large ceremonial offerings—such as giant rice cakes, whole pigs, or whole sheep—also require ample space, making the outdoor divine ground more suitable.

=== The procession and worship ===
==== The procession ====
The procession (巡境) is the central component of the Teochew Deity Parade procession. When the deity goes on patrol, the purpose is to purify the territory, dispel malign forces, and bestow blessings upon the community. In traditional Chaoshan practice, the巡境 route covers the village’s main roads and passes key landmarks such as temples, ancestral halls, village gates, and markets—symbolizing the purification of the entire domain. The procession is led by ma‑tou gongs (馬頭鑼) and attendants sprinkling purifying water (淨水), announcing the deity’s approach and ritually cleansing the path. They are followed by tall lanterns, ceremonial banners, embroidered standards, flower lanterns, painted theatrical figures, animal dances, Teochew gong‑and‑drum ensembles, and the famous Yingge dance troupe. At the end of the procession comes the palanquin bearing the deity, carried by strong young men who move slowly along the predetermined route.

==== Welcoming ====
During the deity procession, every household sets up an incense table at the doorway, arranging offerings, lighting incense, and setting off firecrackers to welcome the deity’s palanquin. At the village entrance, a larger ritual altar is erected with offerings such as the Five Sacrificial Animals (五牲; pig, chicken, duck, fish, and meat), red peach cakes, incense, and candles. Villagers pray for blessings and peace throughout the year. During this time, worshippers seek opportunities for "leaping over fire" (過火) and "touching the palanquin" (摸轎)—two of the most significant interactive rituals in Teochew deity processions.

Leaping Over Fire is most common in the martial‑style processions (武營) or in the segment known as Running with the Deity (走老爺; lit. letting the deity move quickly). Palanquin bearers leap over burning piles of straw or wood while carrying the deity. This act symbolizes purification, expulsion of evil, the deity’s protective power, crossing over misfortune and entering a year of good fortune. It is one of the most iconic and visually striking parts of Teochew Deity Parades.

Touching the palanquin is a key moment of direct interaction between humans and the deity. As the palanquin passes, worshippers reach out to touch the palanquin—or, in some villages, the deity’s image itself. According to local belief, this contact brings divine protection, grants good luck, ensures peace and safety for the coming year. This custom is considered one of the most heartfelt expressions of devotion.

=== Returning ===
Returning of the Deity’s Palanquin (回鑾), also called the deity’s return to the temple (回鑾入廟). It refers to the ritual conclusion of the deity’s territorial procession (巡境). After the procession circled the community, the palanquin carrying the deity's image is escorted back to the temple amid the crackling of firecrackers set off by devotees. This return symbolizes that the deity has completed the tasks of purifying the territory and expelling malign forces, and is now re‑entering the temple to resume the divine seat, bringing renewed peace and auspiciousness to the community for the coming year. When the palanquin reaches the temple gate, there is usually a final, highly energetic sequence of movements—such as “three advances and three retreats” (三進三退) or a rapid, vigorous charge—marking the climax of the procession before the deity re‑enters the sacred precinct.

== Procession styles ==
Teochew Deity Parade can be broadly divided into two distinct styles: civil procession (文營) and martial procession (武營). The two differ sharply in atmosphere, movement, and ritual expression.

=== Civil procession ===
The civil procession is a relatively calm, orderly, and ceremonial style of parade. The procession advances in a measured, disciplined rhythm, emphasizing solemnity, ritual dignity, and the aesthetic display of folk arts. Its overall character is stately, composed, and highly presentational, resembling a large‑scale cultural pageant. This is the standard format adopted by most Chaoshan villages. The deity’s palanquin (老爺轎) is carried steadily by selected strong bearers, following behind an elaborate formation of banners, musicians, and performance troupes. The purpose is for the deity to inspect the territory, receive worship from the community, and symbolically bless and secure the land. Interaction between deity and devotees is expressed mainly through household offering tables set up along the route. As the palanquin passes slowly, villagers offer incense and bow in reverence—an elegant, ritualized display of "the deity touring the realm" (神明巡境). A typical civil procession includes, banner and flag teams, including civil banners carry by young women and martial banners carry by young men, plaque bearers holding signs such as “Silence” (肅靜) and “Make Way” (迴避), Teochew gongs and drums, Yingge dance troupes, Lion dance teams, Flower‑basket teams, Teochew opera performers. Participants often wear coordinated Chaoshan traditional costumes, showcasing exquisite local embroidery and craftsmanship.

=== Martial procession ===
The martial procession is the opposite in spirit: fast‑paced, explosive, physical, and intensely energetic. It is a dynamic, high‑adrenaline ritual filled with daring movements, competitive strength, and a carnival‑like atmosphere. The mood is wild, fierce, and ecstatic, often accompanied by feats that appear dangerous to outsiders. Martial processions are most common in rural communities, such as Yanzao of Shantau (鹽灶) and parts of Jiexi (揭西), where older, more primal forms of folk ritual have been preserved. Participants are typically robust young men.

==== Running with the Deity ====
Running with the Deity is a common martial ritual. Palanquin bearers sprint at full speed with the deity’s palanquin through designated sections of the route. This represents the deity’s swift and powerful touring the realm, demonstrating divine authority and protective force.

==== Charging the Village Gate ====
Charging the Village Gate (衝寨門) is the climactic, visually dramatic moment of the martial procession. Bearers rush the palanquin toward the symbolic “village gate” with force, signifying the deity’s entry into the settlement to clear obstacles, dispel misfortune, and bring blessings.

==== Dragging the Deity ====
Dragging the Deity (拖老爺) is a famous local variant. Villagers deliberately pull, drag, or tug at the palanquin—sometimes into water or mud. Locals believe: The more vigorously the deity is dragged, the more prosperous the coming year (老爺公好拖，越拖越興旺). The intensity of the struggle is seen as a direct invocation of good fortune and agricultural abundance.

==== Throwing the Deity ====
Throwing the Deity (摔老爺) is one of the most extreme and primal forms of martial ritual. It is a local variant of God Parade activity in Puning Xinan and nearby areas. The deity image is thrown high into the air and allowed to fall, sometimes forcefully. This is not considered disrespectful. Villagers believe: the harder the throw, the greater the prosperity (越摔越興). If the deity lands upright or with the head facing upward, it is interpreted as a powerful omen of good luck, prompting loud cheers. Because of the force involved, the wooden deity image often suffers broken limbs or chipped gold leaf. Villagers eagerly collect these fallen fragments, treating them as potent protective talismans to take home and enshrine.

== Parade troupes ==
=== The Ceremonial Escort ===
At the very front of the procession marches a strong man striking the horse‑head gong (馬頭鑼), announcing the arrival of the deity and clearing the way. He is followed by a ritual attendant carrying pomegranate blossoms, sprinkling herbal purifying water along the route to dispel inauspicious influences. Behind them comes the ceremonial escort. Banner‑bearers hold lacquered wooden plaques gilded with inscriptions such as "Silence", "Make Way", the deity’s title, and the name of the village. Young men carry the imposing Five‑Dragon Command Flags (五龍令旗), their bright colours and vigorous movement signalling divine authority.

Next is the standard‑flag troupe, usually composed of local young women dressed in qipao or traditional Chaoshan attire. Working in pairs, they carry richly woven standard flags embroidered with auspicious motifs, blessings such as "Timely Winds and Gentle Rains" (風調雨順) or "Abundant Harvests" (五穀豐登), or the names of local clans—expressions of the community’s collective hopes. In some villages, men dressed in traditional martial costumes serve as the standard‑flag bearers instead. Following them are children dressed as opera characters, each holding an ornate flower basket. They symbolise good fortune, purity, and the passing on of cultural heritage.

In coastal regions, the procession also includes a Fish‑Shrimp‑Crab Troupe. Children carry large bamboo‑framed, paper‑moulded, brightly painted models of sea creatures—fish, shrimp, crabs, clams, soft‑shell turtles, conches, and more. These represent the blessing of "abundance year after year" (年年有餘) and express prayers for divine protection over fishermen, safe voyages, and plentiful catches.

=== Performance Troupes ===
The Teochew grand gong and drum ensemble is the heartbeat of the Teochew Deity Parade. It is not merely festive music—it is a public display of a village’s vitality, cohesion, and ritual strength. The ensemble is led by the drum master, who wields two wooden mallets to strike a large, sharp‑footed barrel drum roughly two feet in diameter. He functions as both percussionist and conductor, controlling the ensemble’s tempo, transitions, and emotional intensity. Following the lead drum are layers of percussion instruments: battle gongs (斗鑼), deep‑tone gongs (深波), large and small cymbals, and a small high‑pitched gong called kim-á (欽仔; Teochew: kim¹ á²). Behind them come the melodic instruments, with the Teochew double‑reed oboe (的禾) taking the lead, supported by bamboo flutes and a range of string instruments such as the erhu, yehu, yangqin, and sanxian. Together they create the characteristic blend of "drum‑and‑wind music" interwoven with string‑and‑orchestral textures.

Yingge Dance is another major performance element, especially prominent in Puning, Chaoyang, Jieyang, Huilai, and Lufeng. Dancers wield two specially crafted Yingge batons (英歌槌), striking and flipping them in powerful, synchronized movements that match the driving rhythms of the gongs and drums. The choreography fuses dance with Southern Chinese martial arts, producing a vigorous, heroic style. Performers paint their faces with Water Margin hero masks—such as Li Kui, Yang Zhi, or Lu Zhishen—and reenact scenes inspired by the Water Margin episode of the 108 Liangshan heroes attacking Daming Prefecture (大名府), combining leaps, strikes, and shouted calls to evoke martial valor.

Teochew people believe that lions possess the power to ward off malevolent forces, so the lion dance typically appears near the front of the procession. Through movements such as leaping, shaking, and "dotting the eyes," the lion symbolically clears the path for the deity, ensuring peace and protection for the community. The Teochew lion belongs to the Southern Lion tradition, characterized by a high forehead, large mouth, and expressive eyes. Its performance emphasizes strong stances and forceful energy, portraying the lion’s full emotional range—joy, anger, sorrow, delight, movement, stillness, surprise, and suspicion. The lion’s choreography is tightly synchronized with the grand gong-and-drum rhythms: when the drums quicken, the lion becomes fierce and explosive; when the drums slow, the lion moves with grace and poise, producing a powerful visual and auditory impact.

=== The Deity Palanquin ===
The deity palanquin, an eight‑bearer sedan chair carrying the image of the deity, is the focal point of the entire procession. It is borne by the village’s strongest young men, and worshippers crowd forward to touch the palanquin in hopes of receiving blessings and good fortune. Elders of high moral standing accompany the palanquin, dressed in long gowns and traditional mandarin jackets, each holding burning incense. Their presence symbolizes lineage continuity and the transmission of communal tradition from one generation to the next.

== Comparable ritual traditions ==
Rituals similar to the Teochew Deity Parade can be found across East and South Asia. In Taiwan, these include processional patrols (巡境, 繞境 or 遊境), in Fuzhou and the Min‑dong region, the you‑shen (游神) or "sacred palanquin procession" (聖駕巡遊); in Korea, the Gangneung Danoje Festival; in Japan, the Shinko-shiki; in Singapore and Malaysia, the deity processions and Chingay parade; and in India’s Odisha state, the famous Ratha Yatra chariot festival. Despite differences in timing, ritual structure, and the specific deities involved, these traditions share a core purpose: during major festivals, the community invites its local tutelary deity out of the temple to tour the territory under its protection. This ritual inspection of the domain serves to purify the land, dispel harmful influences, and bestow blessings and protection upon the community.
