= Yingge dance =

Chinese folk dance from Teochew, Guandong

Yingge Dance (also spelled Ying Ge), also known as Yangge or Yingge, originated in the mid-Ming dynasty. It is a form of Chinese folk square dance in the Chaoshan region of Guangdong, integrating elements of Southern-style martial arts and Chinese opera into a unified local art form. It is especially popular in the Chaopu-Huilu area (Chaoyang, Puning, Huilai, and Lufeng). Performers wear face paint representing heroes of Liangshan, or carry cudgels or hand drums, forming and transforming various formations in rhythm with the drums. The performance style is bold and vigorous. On May 20, 2006, Yingge was inscribed into the first list of 518 items of China’s National Intangible Cultural Heritage.

== History ==
There are various theories about the origin of Yingge, including its relation to the Water Margin, the Nuo origin theory, the idea that it came into Chaoshan via Putian from Shandong, the Waijiang Opera theory, the martial arts training theory, and a comprehensive theory. However, the earliest period is generally believed to be the mid-to-late Ming dynasty. The source cited is from the Qianlong era of the Qing dynasty, by Qianlong and Zhou Shuoxun in the "Chaozhou Prefecture Gazetteer," volume twelve: "In spring, farmers transplant rice seedlings in groups of dozens, with one person beating the drum; at each drumbeat a round is made, and people sing in competition continuously for days, called Yangge. This is an unplanned gathering." This description of the performance style differs greatly from today's Yingge. Moreover, from local chronicles and even folk bamboo poetry, especially records related to Lantern Festival customs in Chaozhou, it is often mentioned as being "no different from Zhongzhou." Nevertheless, it shows that the most common folk art among the Han people at that time—Yangge—was very popular in the modern Chaoshan area. During the Jiaqing and Daoguang periods (1805-1825), local theaters often performed dramas related to Water Margin, such as "The Attack on Daming Prefecture." Additionally, the costumes and face paint used in current Yingge troupes closely resemble theatrical styles, clearly showing the influence of drama.

== Intangible Cultural Heritage ==
“The table below lists selected Yingge dance traditions that have been officially recognized as intangible cultural heritage. It shows the level of recognition, the year and batch of inscription, and the associated representative inheritors, reflecting the distribution of Yingge dance across different regions.”

| Project name | Level | National Announcement Date | Provincial Announcement Date | Representative Inheritors |
|---|---|---|---|---|
| Yingge (Chaoyang Yingge) | National | 2006 (First Batch) | 2006 (First Batch) | Yang Wei, Lin Zhongcheng (Lin Song) |
| Yingge (Puning Yingge) | National | 2006 (First Batch) | 2006 (First Batch) | Chen Laifa |
| Yingge (Jiazi Yingge) | National | 2011 (Third Batch) | 2007 (Second Batch) | Lin Bingguang |
| Yingge (Chaonan Yingge) | Provincial | | 2012 (Fourth Batch) | |
| Yingge (Shenquan Yingge) | Provincial | | 2012 (Fourth Batch) | |
| Yingge (Chao'an Wenli Yingge Dance) | Provincial | | 2015 (Sixth Batch) | |

== Types ==
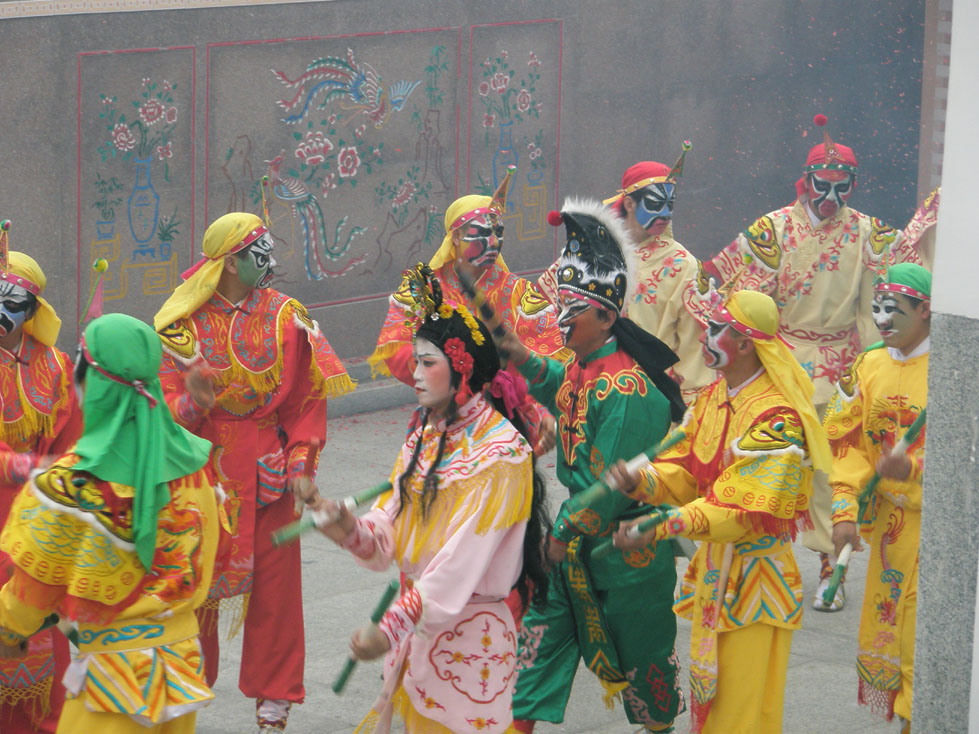
Zhongban Yingge performance

In this context, “types” of Yingge dance are classified primarily according to rhythm, tempo, and cudgel technique, focusing on differences in performance structure rather than regional or stylistic variation.

Yingge dance is categorized according to rhythm and tempo into Slow-tempo Yingge, Medium-tempo Yingge, and Fast-tempo Yingge.

=== Slow-tempo Yingge ===
Performers hold a Yingge cudgel slightly longer than in other types, approximately 60 cm. The cudgel striking rhythm is usually coordinated with the sound of gongs and drums in sets of three or four movements. Each strike of the cudgel is accompanied by a specific action. This type of Yingge is mainly concentrated near Miancheng, Chaoyang District. Performers do not use face paint representing heroes such as Song Jiang or Shi Qian. Its style is simple and rustic and is considered the earliest form of Yingge.

=== Medium-tempo Yingge ===
The cudgel used in Medium-tempo Yingge is approximately 57 cm long. Its rhythm is faster than that of Slow-tempo Yingge, with strikes organized into sets of five, seven, eight, ten, eleven, or thirteen movements. Performers do not use the “Snake Dancer” (Shi Qian) face paint. The movements are primarily based on the “Da Zhan Ma” stance from Southern Fist martial arts.

=== Fast-tempo Yingge ===
Fast-tempo Yingge uses the shortest cudgel, approximately 40 cm long, and features the fastest rhythm, emphasizing rapid striking and retraction. There is no fixed cudgel striking pattern; instead, it exhibits a more flexible and dynamic performance structure. Fast-tempo Yingge can be further divided into subtypes such as Jianshan Yingge, Nanshan Wen style, Nanshan Wu style, and paired-combat forms.

== Performance ==
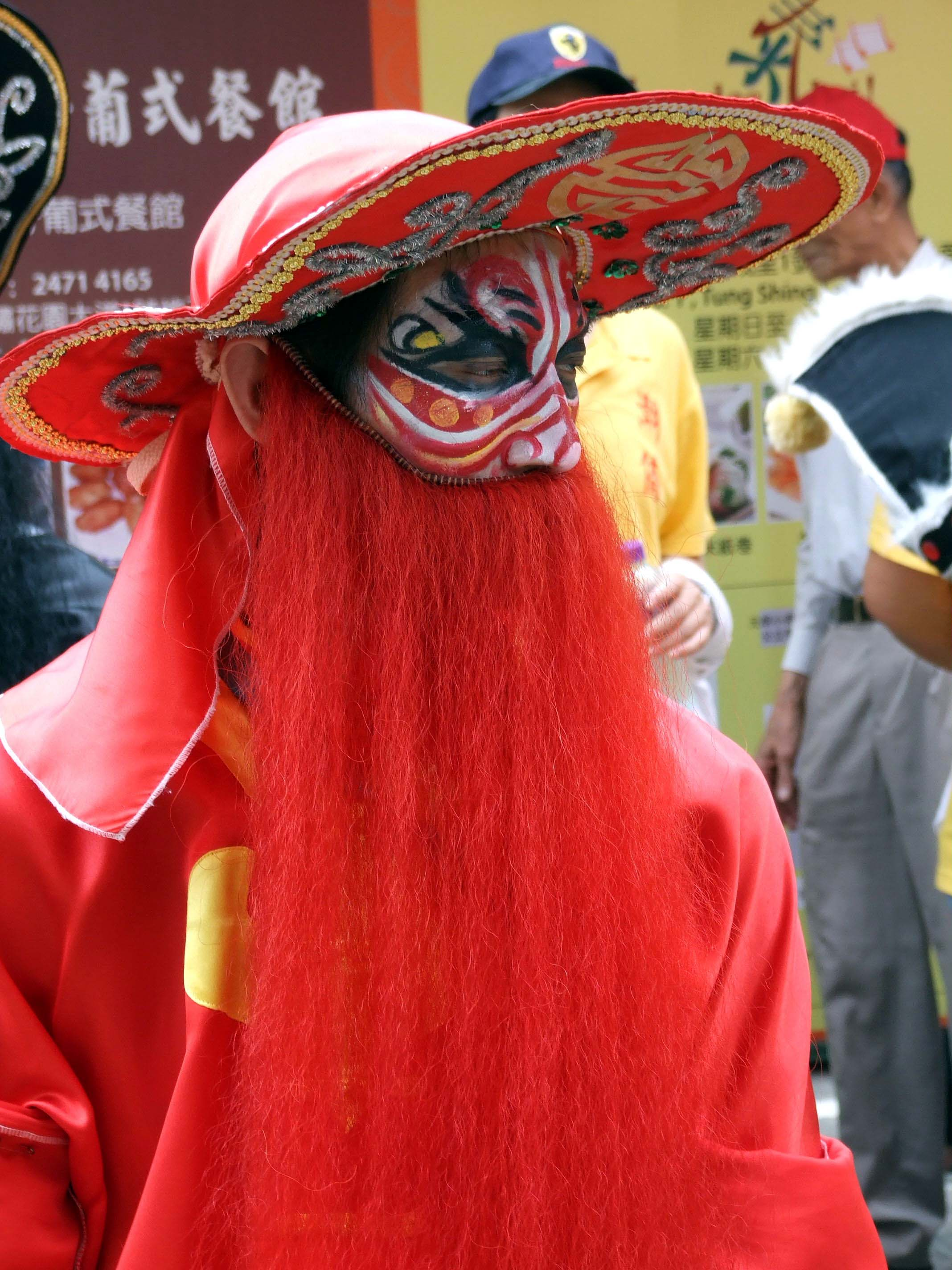
Red-faced "Head Cudgel"

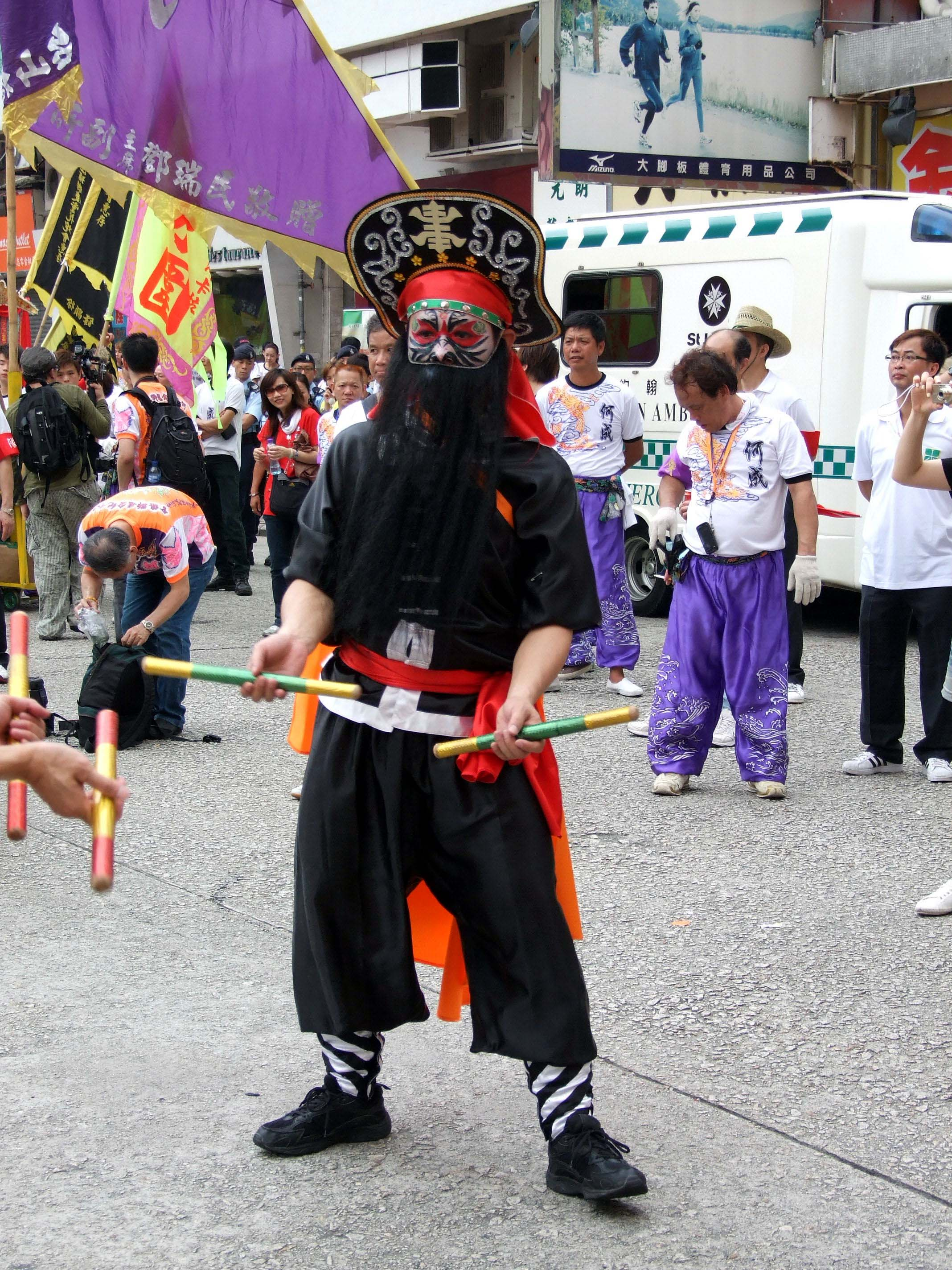
Black-faced "Second Cudgel"

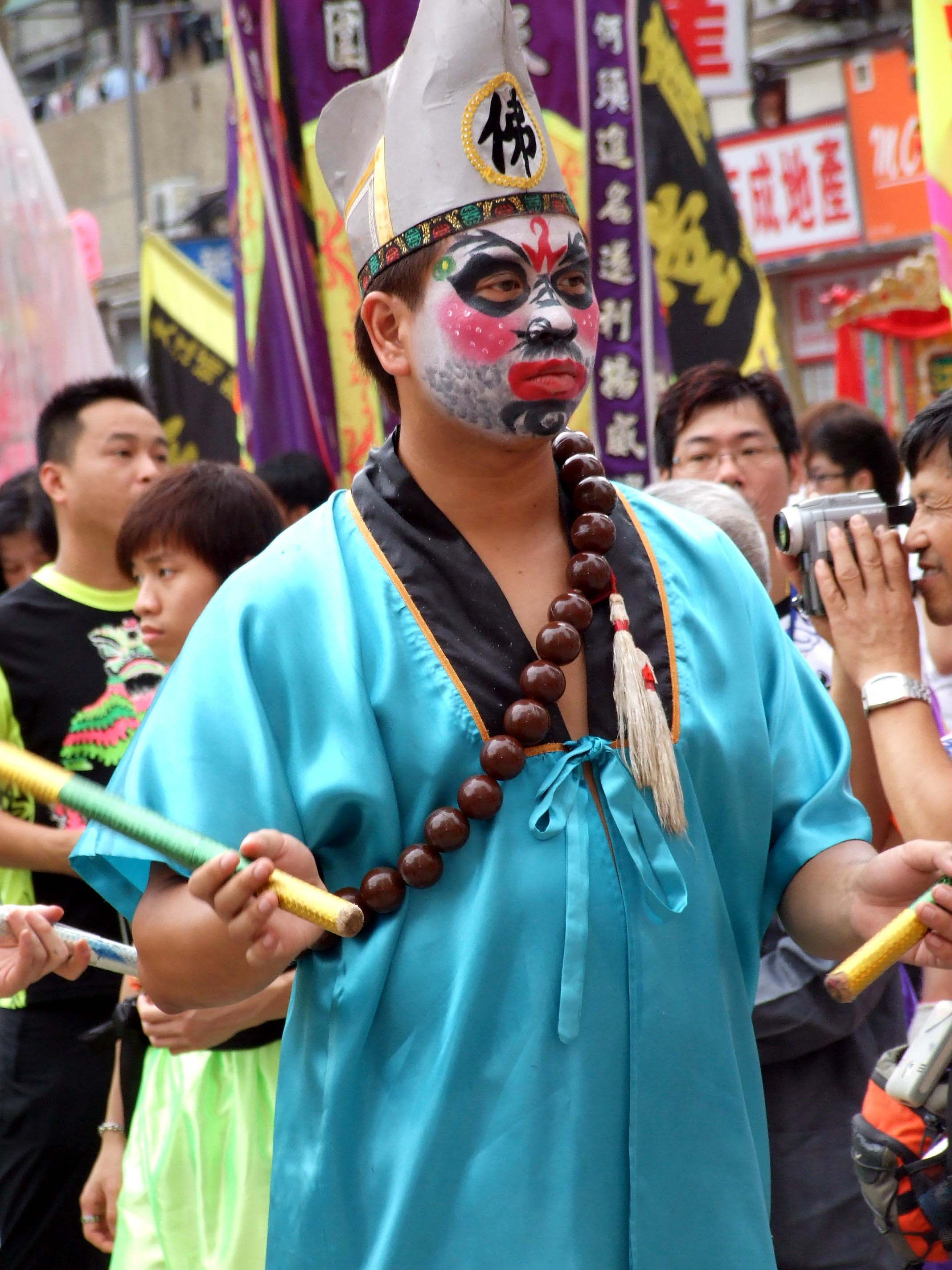
"Third Cudgel" Lu Zhishen

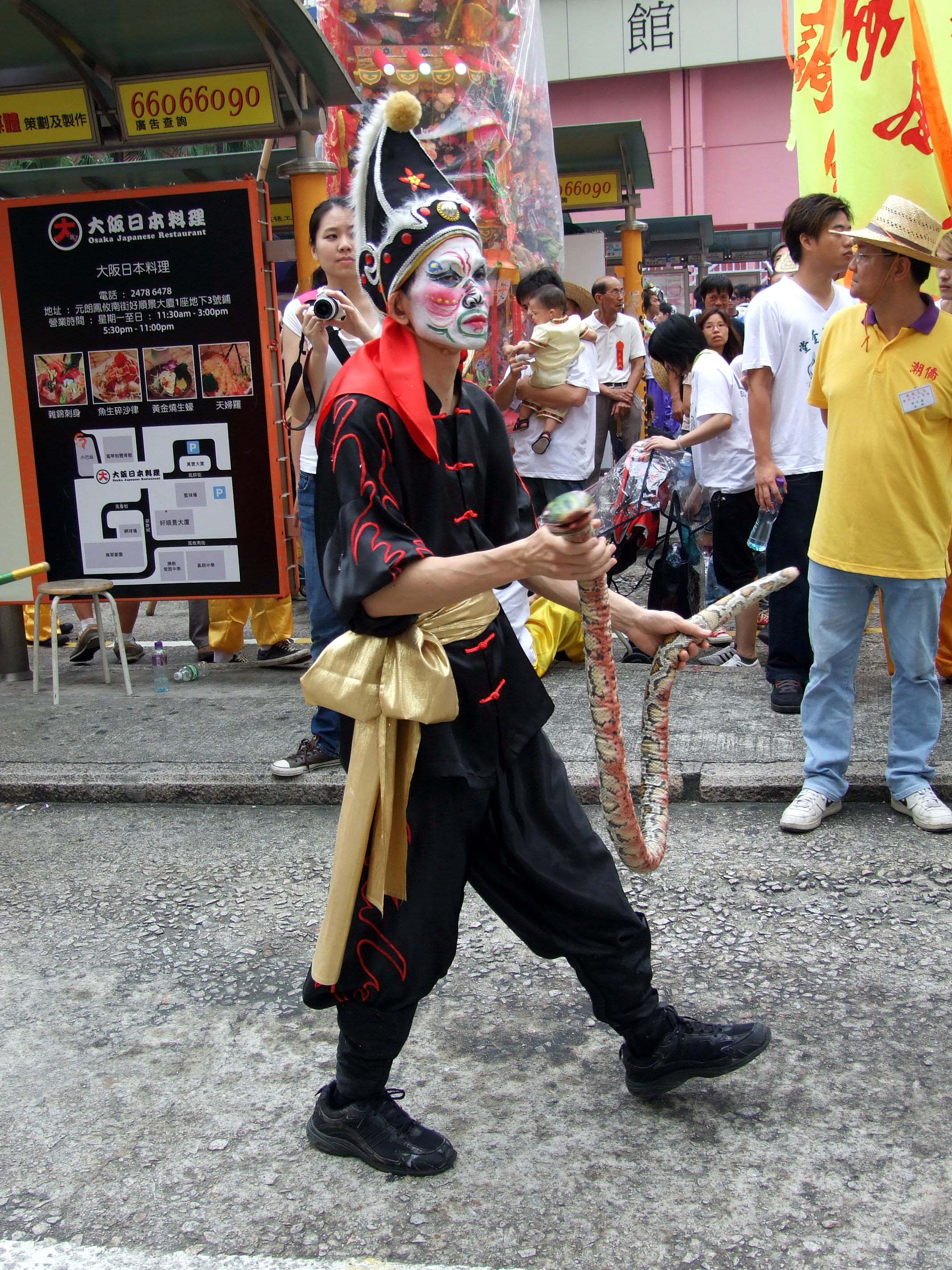
"Snake Dancer" Shi Qian

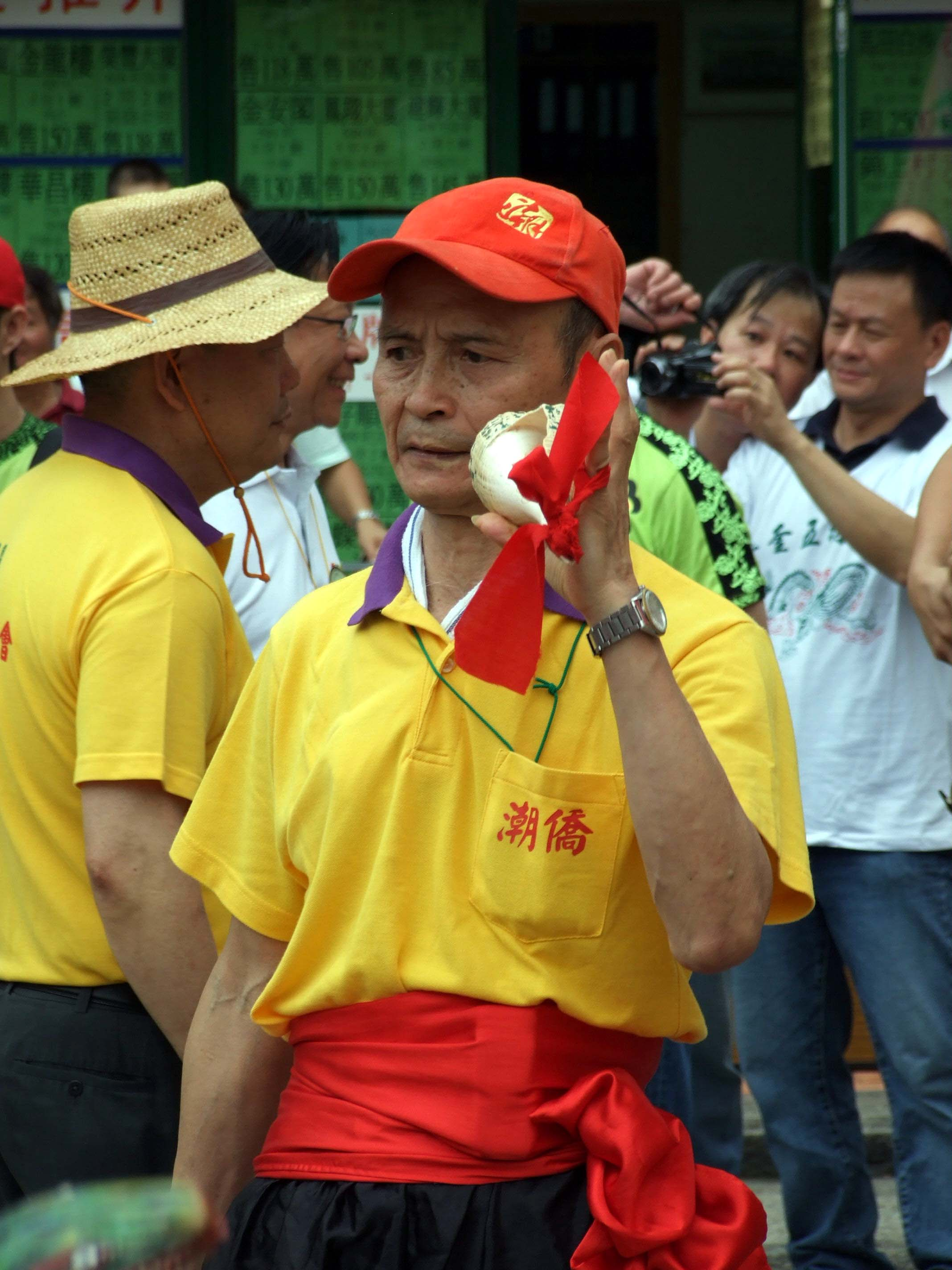
Conch horn

The number of performers in a Yingge troupe generally depends on the number of men in the village. It is always an even number, at least 16, and no more than 108. Commonly, there are 36 members, known as the "Thirty-Six Heavenly Spirits," or 72 members, known as the "Seventy-Two Earthly Fiends." Performances are divided into front stage and rear stage. Modern Yingge usually refers to front stage performances, as rear stage performances are mostly discontinued. The content mainly depicts heroes from Water Margin disguising themselves to attack Daming Prefecture to rescue Lu Junyi, or to rescue Song Jiang from execution. Currently, performances are primarily based on the former. Troupe members strike Yingge cudgels or hand drums in rhythm with the gongs and drums while continuously changing their dance movements and formations to form various patterns and express different emotions. After the front stage performance, the rear stage would include opera and martial arts demonstrations.

=== Facial makeup and face painting ===
The Yingge facial makeup can be divided into the following two types:

- Ghost-face makeup: Primarily uses black and white colors, avoiding ferocity or horror.
- Opera-face makeup: Draws inspiration from theatrical facial designs, mostly portraying characters from Water Margin. The facial styles are designed based on the traits of each individual character.

A Yingge troupe typically includes two lead dancers: the red-faced, red-bearded “First Hammer” (tou-chui), often dressed as Qin Ming or Guan Sheng; and the black-faced, black-bearded “Second Hammer” (er-chui), portrayed as Li Kui. Additionally, the “snake dancer,” representing Shi Qian, mainly assists with directing the performance. Some troupes may also include a “Third Hammer” as Lu Zhishen and a “Fourth Hammer” as Wu Song. The drummer is usually portrayed by Song Jiang or Lin Chong, which is the most common facial makeup. In some Yingge troupes, a performer carrying a command banner may appear as Gongsun Sheng; these roles are relatively fixed and familiar to the audience.

Facial makeup is generally applied by the performers themselves, except for more complex designs where makeup artists or fellow actors may assist. Before applying makeup, the face is cleansed, and a two-inch-wide black cloth band is tied tightly around the head to pull the hair back (“tightening the head,” known in the Teochew dialect as “head scarf”), helping smooth the facial muscles. For martial characters, the makeup is painted directly onto the face (“outline painting”), while civil characters first rub a base color evenly across the face using their hands before painting the eyebrows, eye sockets, nasal contours, mouth corners, and cheeks, followed by facial lines. The order of coloring is also fixed: black first, then white, and finally other colors. Since Yingge performers portray the outlaws of Mount Liang, many characters wear full beards to embody the rugged heroic image, with specific beard styles assigned to particular characters—for example, Lu Zhishen uses a “curling beard.” Some performers may even go shirtless, painting patterns directly on their upper bodies. As for the female roles in the troupe, they are traditionally portrayed by men.

=== Costumes ===
Headwear

- Kuitou, also called "general helmet," worn by military generals.
- Luo hat, worn by non-military characters.
- Straw hat, worn by commoners.
- Headscarf, used in combination with headwear.

Clothing

- Hero robe, worn by martial roles.
- Exaggerated robe, worn by Shi Qian.
- Armor suit, worn by military generals.
- Shoes: early performers wore straw sandals, now commonly straw-soled shoes; female performers wear embroidered shoes.

=== Props ===
- Yingge cudgel, a short wooden stick, diameter about 25 mm, thinner for female performers. Length varies from 35 to 58 cm depending on style, usually black and red, decorated with Taiji patterns at both ends.
- Hand drum, short cylindrical drum with handle, diameter about 15 cm, painted red, green, and black, with 30 cm-long drumsticks with colorful ribbons.
- Snake prop, 150 cm long, used by Shi Qian.
- Command flag, usually triangular, held by Gongsun Sheng.
- Palm fan, used in rear stage performances by elderly characters.

=== Music ===
Yingge dance music consists only of rhythm, without melody. Different types correspond to different gong and drum rhythms.

=== Instruments ===
Instruments used by the percussion team:

- Bass drum, diameter about 60 cm, wooden frame with cowhide drumhead. The drummer is usually Song Jiang or Lin Chong.
- Medium drum, diameter about 50 cm, similar to bass drum; strapped to the drummer.
- Qinzai, a copper gong unique to Chaoshan.
- Big gong, same as Suoluo, also called "navel gong" by Chaoshan people.
- Cymbals, also called "small cymbals."
- Cloud gong, same as Moon gong.
- Nao bo, also called "water cymbals."
- Conch horn, a shell trumpet.
- Ox horn, produces a loud sound.

=== Movements ===
Yingge dance movements include formations, footwork, body techniques, hand techniques, finger techniques, and eye techniques, with footwork being the most important as it drives all other techniques.

== See also ==
- Yangge
- Dance of China
- Chinese fitness dancing
