= Qipan railway station =

Railway station in Jilin, China

Coordinates: 43.9677°N 126.5472°E

Qipan 棋盘

General information
- Other names: Qipan
- Location: Jilin City, Jilin; China
- Operated by: China Railway Corporation
- Line(s): Jilin–Shulan, Jiuzhan–Jiangmifeng

Other information
- Station code: 132021

Qipan Railway Station is a railway station of the Jilin–Shulan Railway and Jiuzhan-Jiangmifeng Railway. The station is located in the Longtan District of Jilin, Jilin province, China. It is situated 19 kilometers away from Jilin Station and 71 kilometers away from Huantouqinshulan Station.

Qipan Railway Station falls under the jurisdiction of the Jilin Train Department of China Railway Shenyang Bureau Group Co. Ltd. (formerly known as Shenyang Railway Bureau).

== See also ==
- Jilin–Shulan Railway
- Jiuzhan–Jiangmifeng Railway
