= Jiangmifeng railway station =

Railway station in Jilin, China

Jiangmifeng 江密峰

General information
- Other names: Jiangmifeng
- Location: Jilin City, Jilin; China
- Operator: China Railway Corporation
- Lines: Changchun–Tumen, Jiuzhan–Jiangmifeng
Location

Jiangmifeng railway station is a railway station of Changchun–Tumen Railway and Jiuzhan–Jiangmifeng Railway. The station located in the Longtan District of Jilin, Jilin province, China.

== See also ==
- Jilin–Shulan Railway
- Jiuzhan–Jiangmifeng Railway
