= 4301/4302 Jilin–Shulan through train =

Railway service in Jilin, China

Jilin–Shulan through train
Overview
- Locale: China
- Current operator(s): Shenyang Railway Bureau

Route
- Termini: Jilin Railway Station; Shulan Railway Station
- Distance travelled: 90 km (56 mi)
- Average journey time: 2 hours, 11 minutes (from Jilin); 1 hour, 59 minutes (from Shulan)
- Train number(s): 4301 (from Jilin); 4302 (from Shulan)

The 4301/4302 Jilin–Shulan through train (Chinese: 4301/4302次吉林到舒兰普通旅客快车) is a Chinese passenger train service running between Jilin City to Shulan express passenger trains by the Shenyang Railway Bureau, Jilin passenger segment responsible for passenger transport task, Jilin originating on the Shulan train. 25B Type Passenger trains running along the Jishu Railway across Jilin and other provinces and cities, the entire 90 km. Jilin Railway Station to Shulan Railway Station running 2 hours and 11 minutes, use trips for 4301; Shulan Railway Station to Jilin Railway Station to run 1 hour and 59 minutes, use trips for 4302.
