= Jiangbei railway station =

Railway station in Jilin, China

Coordinates: 43.8945°N 126.6100°E

Jiangbei 江北
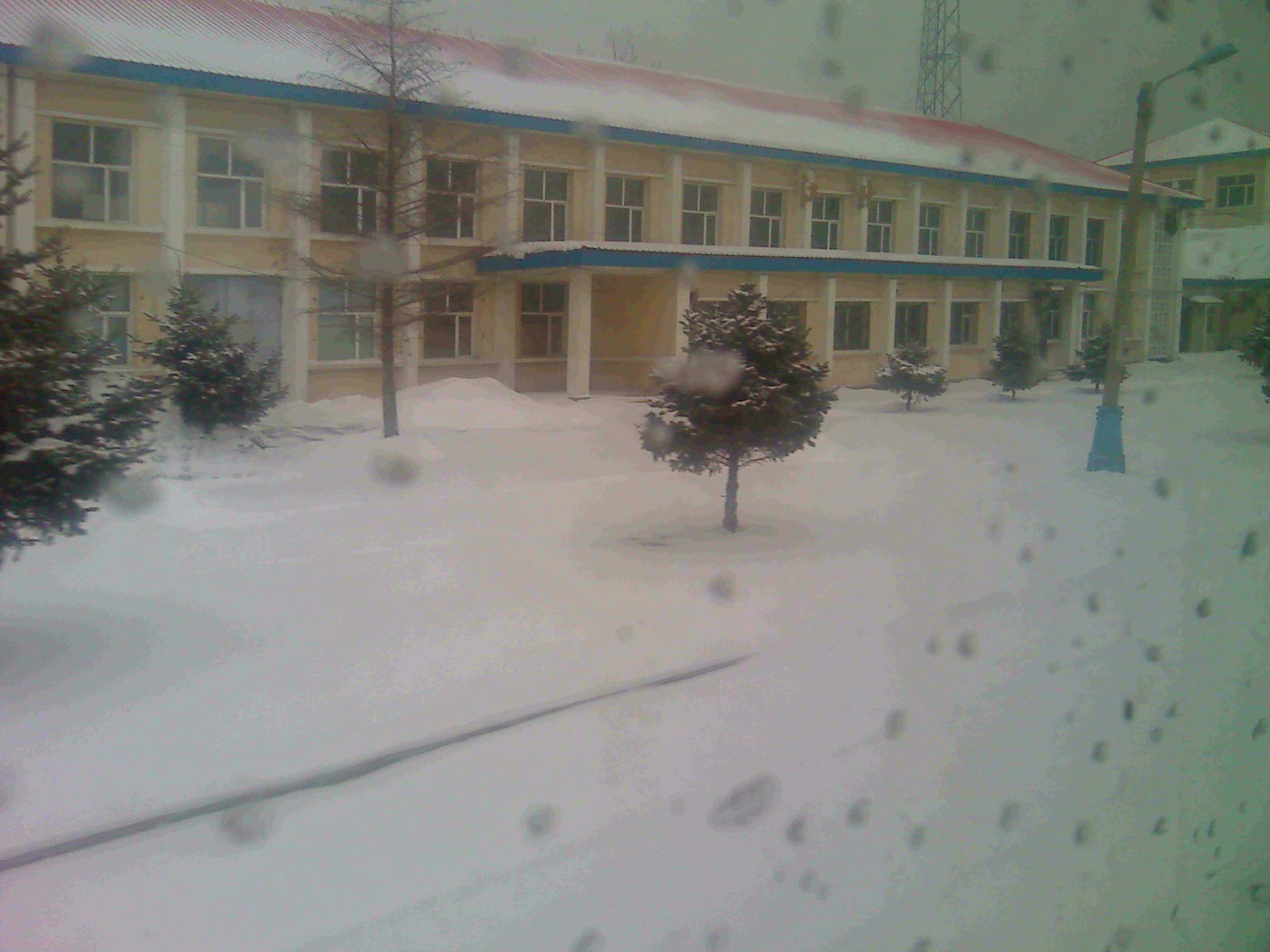

General information
- Other names: Jiangbei
- Location: Jilin City, Jilin; China
- Operator: China Railway Corporation
- Lines: Changchun–Tumen, Jilin–Shulan
Location

Jiangbei railway station is a railway station of Changchun–Tumen Railway and Jilin–Shulan Railway. The station located in the Longtan District of Jilin, Jilin province, China.

== See also ==
- Changchun–Tumen Railway
- Jilin–Shulan Railway
