= Qianyao railway station =

Railway station in Jilin, China

Qianyao 前窑

General information
- Other names: Qianyao
- Location: Jilin City, Jilin; China
- Operator: China Railway Corporation
- Line: Jilin–Shulan

Qianyao railway station is a railway station belonging to Jilin–Shulan Railway and located in the Longtan District of Jilin, Jilin province, China.

== See also ==
- Jilin–Shulan Railway
