= Longtanshan railway station =

Railway station in Jilin, China

Coordinates: 43.8667°N 126.6004°E

Longtanshan 龙潭山
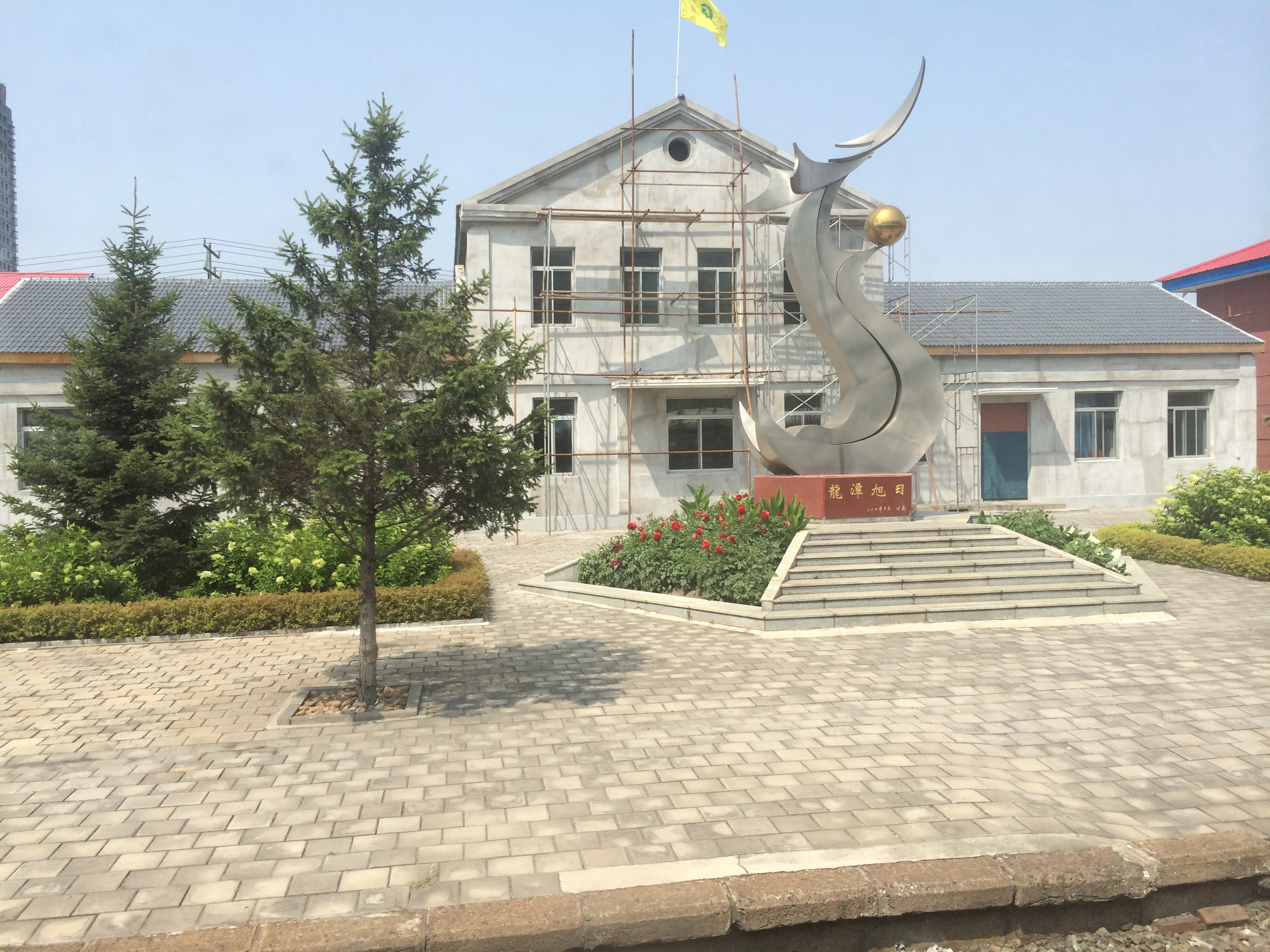

General information
- Other names: Longtanshan
- Location: Jilin City, Jilin; China
- Operated by: China Railway Corporation
- Lines: Changchun–Tumen, Jilin–Shulan, Longtanshan–Fengman
Location

Longtanshan railway station is a railway station of Changchun–Tumen Railway, Jilin–Shulan Railway and Longtanshan–Fengman Railway. The station is located in the Longtan District of Jilin, Jilin province, China.

== See also ==
- Changchun–Tumen Railway
- Jilin–Shulan Railway
- Longtanshan–Fengman Railway
