= Jinzhu railway station =

Railway station in Jilin, China

Coordinates: 44.0196°N 126.5459°E

Jinzhu 金珠

General information
- Other names: Jinzhu
- Location: Jilin City, Jilin; China
- Operated by: China Railway Corporation
- Line(s): Jilin–Shulan

Jinzhu railway station is a railway station belonging to Jilin–Shulan Railway and located in the Longtan District of Jilin, Jilin province, China.

== See also ==
- Jilin–Shulan Railway
