= Dakouqin railway station =

Railway station in Jilin, China

Dakouqin 大口钦
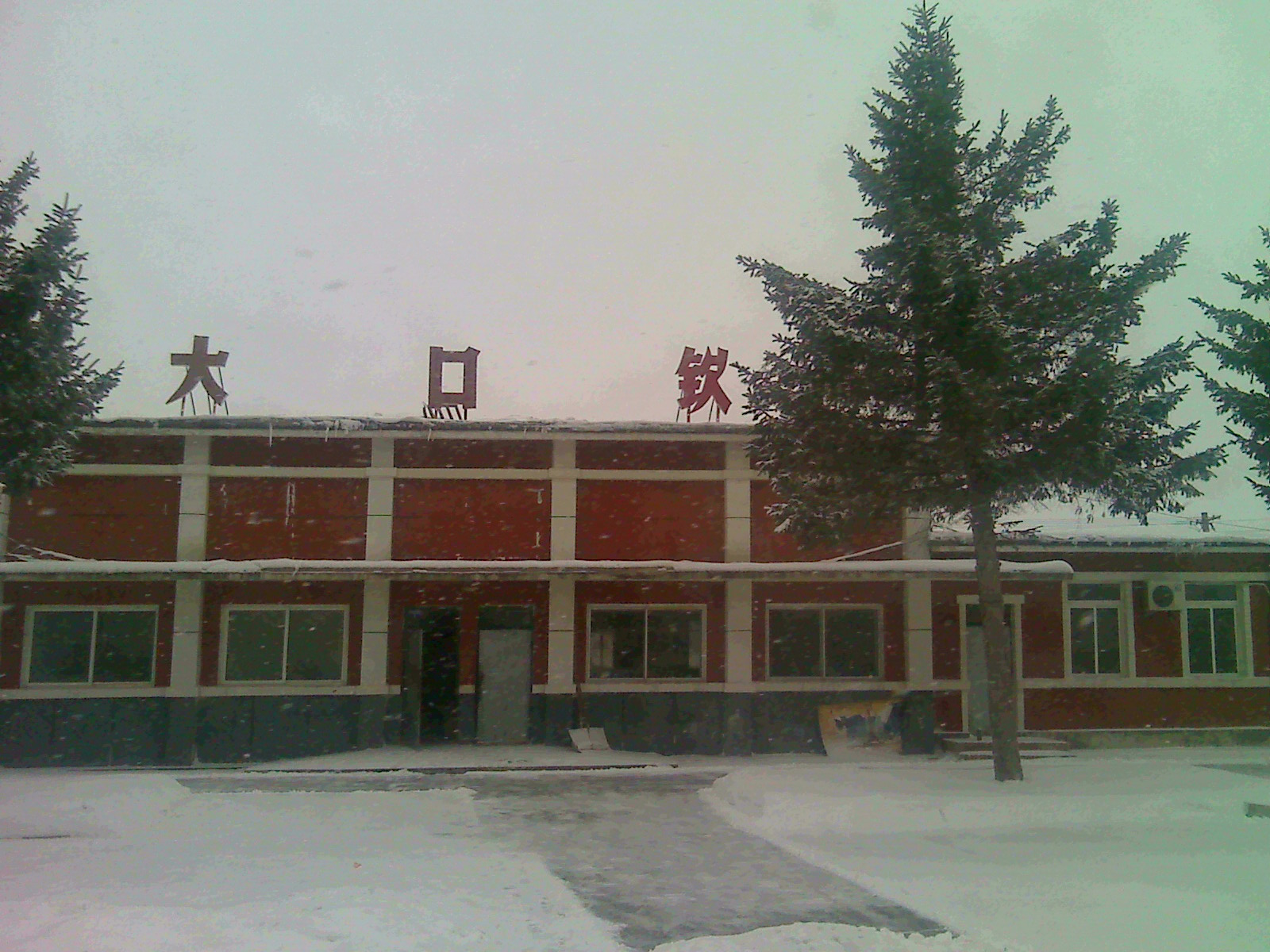
- The waiting hall of Dakouqin railway station

General information
- Other names: Dakouqin
- Location: Jilin City, Jilin; China
- Operated by: China Railway Corporation
- Line: Jilin–Shulan

Other information
- Station code: 62867 (TMIS); DKL (Telegraph code); DKQ (Pinyin code)

Dakouqin railway station is a railway station belonging to Jilin–Shulan Railway and located in the Longtan District of Jilin, Jilin province, China.

== See also ==
- Jilin–Shulan Railway
