= Yafu railway station =

Railway station in Jilin, China

Coordinates: 44.0642°N 126.5320°E

Yafu 亚复

General information
- Other names: Yafu
- Location: Jilin City, Jilin; China
- Operator: China Railway Corporation
- Line: Jilin–Shulan
Location

Yafu railway station is a railway station belonging to Jilin–Shulan Railway and located in the Longtan District of Jilin, Jilin province, China.

== See also ==
- Jilin–Shulan Railway
