= Jilin North railway station =

Railway station in Jilin, China

Coordinates: 43.9139°N 126.5595°E

Jilin North 吉林北
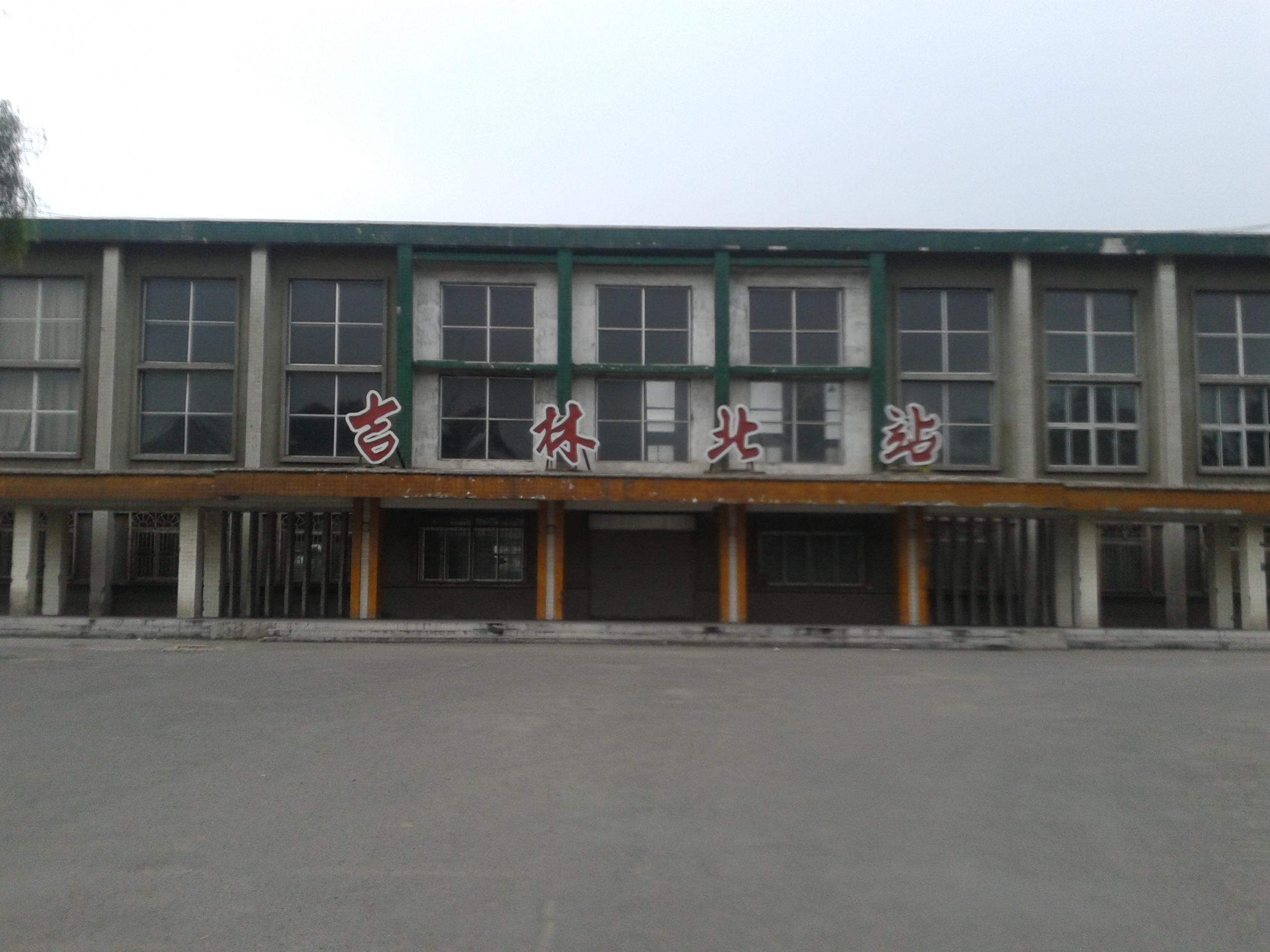

General information
- Other names: Jilinbei
- Location: Jilin City, Jilin; China
- Operator: China Railway Corporation
- Line: Jilin–Shulan
Location

Jilin North railway station is a railway station of Jilin–Shulan Railway. The station located in the Longtan District of Jilin, Jilin province, China.

== See also ==
- Jilin–Shulan Railway
