= Jishu railway station =

Railway station in Shulan, China

Coordinates: 44.2861°N 126.7968°E

Jishu 吉舒
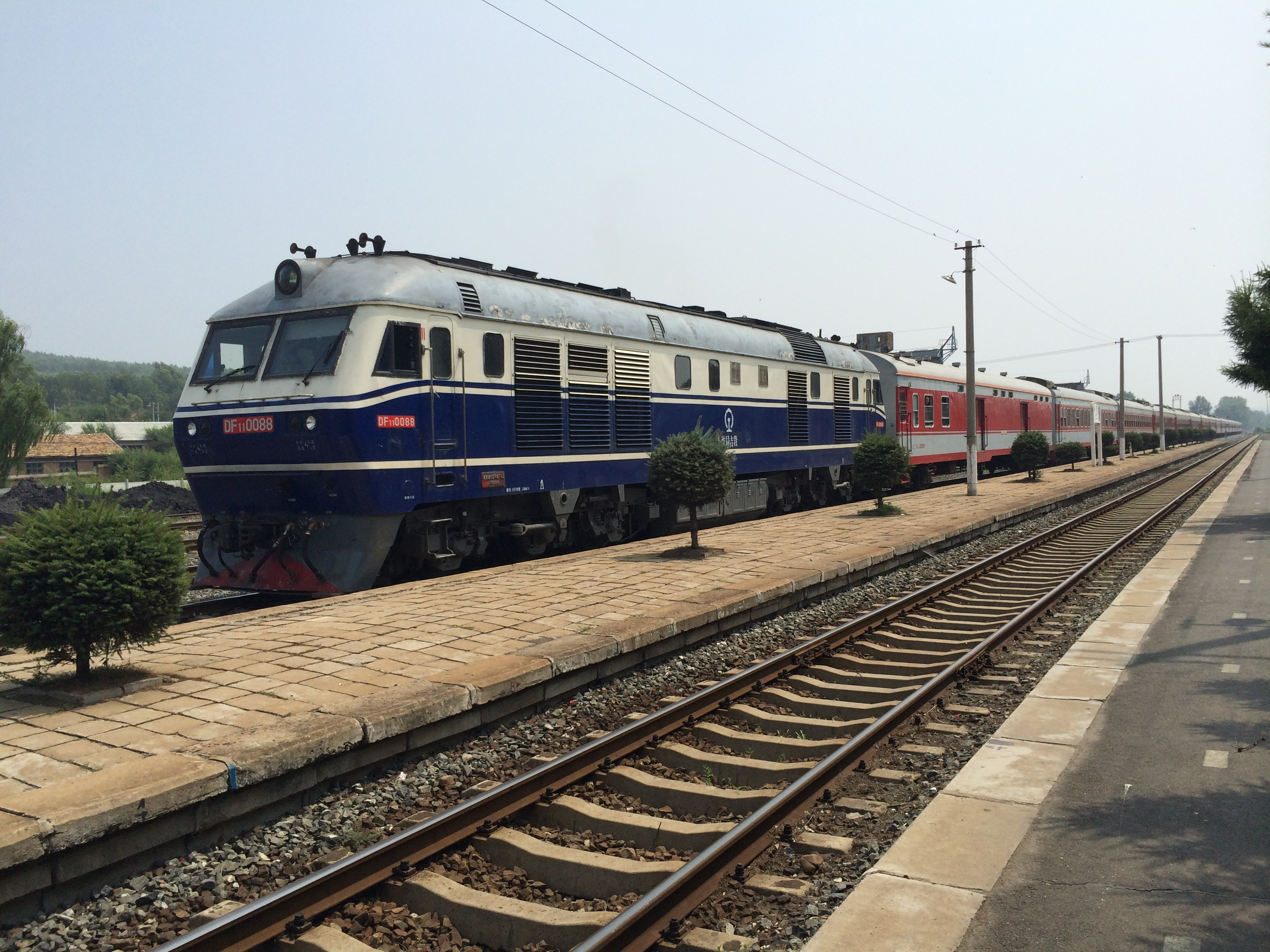
- DF11-0088 hauled K7375 train at Jishu Station

General information
- Other names: Jishu
- Location: Jilin City, Jilin; China
- Operator: China Railway Corporation
- Line: Jilin–Shulan
Location

Jishu railway station is a railway station belonging to Jilin–Shulan Railway and located in the Shulan of Jilin, Jilin province, China.

== See also ==
- Jilin–Shulan Railway
