= Xinjiuzhan railway station =

Railway station in Jilin City, China

Xinjiuzhan 新九站

General information
- Other names: Xinjiuzhan
- Location: Jilin City, Jilin; China
- Coordinates: 43.95296°N 126.45634°E
- Operator: China Railway Corporation
- Lines: Changchun–Tumen, Jiuzhan–Jiangmifeng
Location
- Location within Jilin Location within China

Xinjiuzhan railway station is a railway station of Changchun–Tumen Railway and Jiuzhan–Jiangmifeng Railway. The station is located in the Changyi District of Jilin, Jilin province, China.

== See also ==
- Changchun–Tumen Railway
- Jiuzhan–Jiangmifeng Railway
