= Dongfu railway station =

Railway station in Shulan, China

Coordinates: 44.3644°N 126.8884°E

Dongfu 东富

General information
- Other names: Dongfu
- Location: Jilin City, Jilin; China
- Operator: China Railway Corporation
- Line: Jilin–Shulan
Location

Dongfu railway station is a railway station belonging to Jilin–Shulan Railway and located in the Shulan of Jilin, Jilin province, China.

== See also ==
- Jilin–Shulan Railway
