= Ping'an railway station =

Railway station in Jilin, China

Coordinates: 44.5913°N 127.1681°E

Ping'an 平安

General information
- Other names: Ping'an
- Location: Jilin City, Jilin; China
- Operator: China Railway Corporation
- Line: Lafa–Harbin
Location

Ping'an railway station is a railway station of Lafa–Harbin Railway and located in the Shulan of Jilin, Jilin province, China.

== See also ==
- Lafa–Harbin Railway
