= Shuiquliu railway station =

Railway station in Shulan, China

Shuiquliu 水曲柳

General information
- Other names: Shuiquliu
- Location: Jilin City, Jilin; China
- Coordinates: 44.4923°N 127.0503°E
- Operator: China Railway, China Railway Corporation
- Line: Lafa–Harbin
Location

Shuiquliu railway station is a railway station belonging to Lafa–Harbin Railway and located in the Shulan of Jilin, Jilin province, China.

== See also ==
- Lafa–Harbin Railway
