= Tang Jiali =

Tang Jiali may refer to:

- Tang Jiali (model) (born 1976), Chinese model
- Tang Jiali (footballer) (born 1995), Chinese footballer
