= Pingfang railway station =

Railway station in Harbin, China

Coordinates: 45.5835°N 126.6693°E

Pingfang 平房
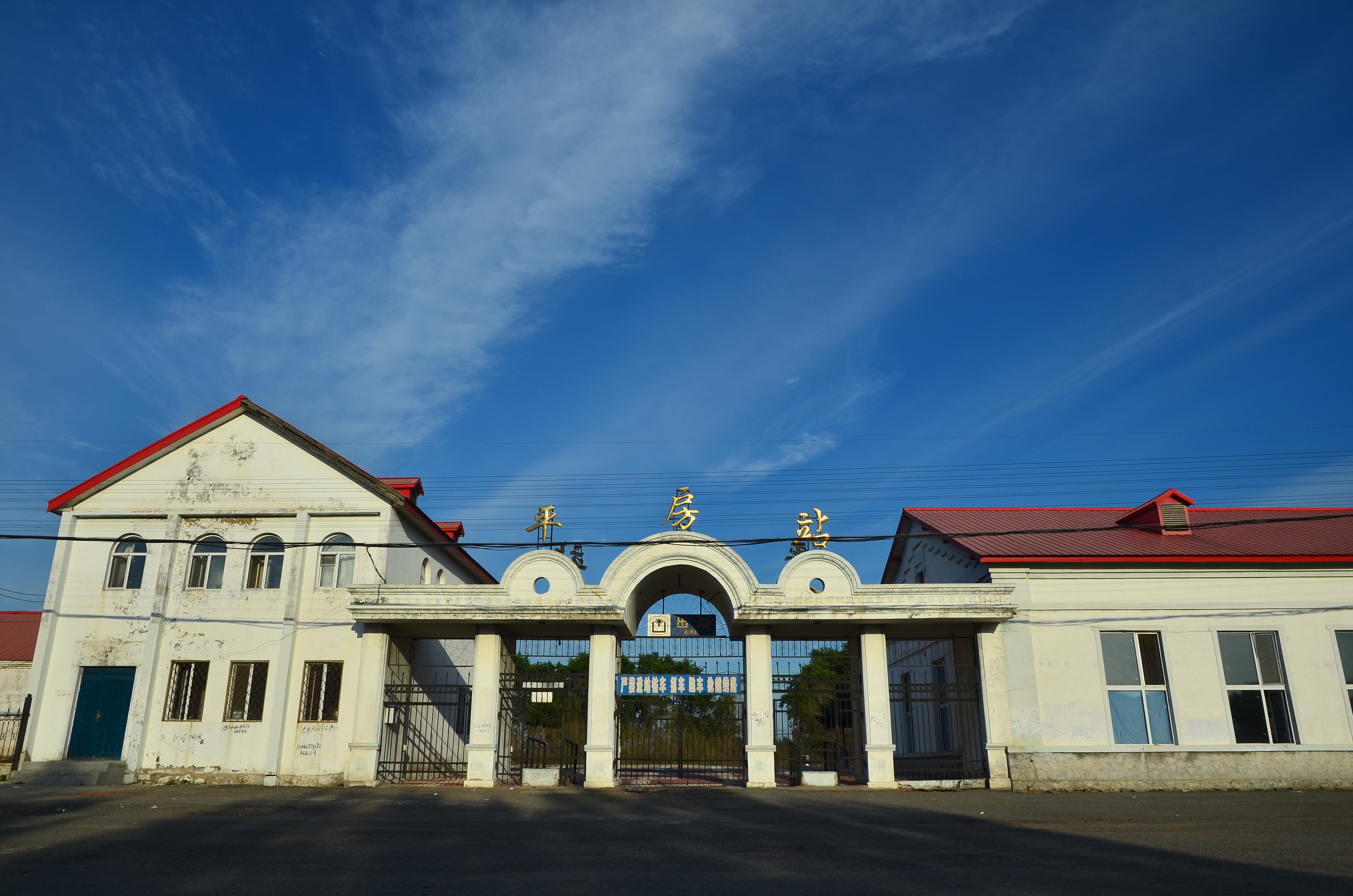

General information
- Other names: Pingfang
- Location: Harbin, Heilongjiang; China
- Operator: China Railway Corporation
- Line: Lafa–Harbin
Location

Pingfang railway station is a railway station of Lafa–Harbin Railway and located in the Pingfang District of Harbin, Heilongjiang province, China.

== See also ==
- Lafa–Harbin Railway
