= Shulan railway station =

Railway station in Shulan, China

Coordinates: 44.4058°N 126.9484°E

Shulan 舒兰
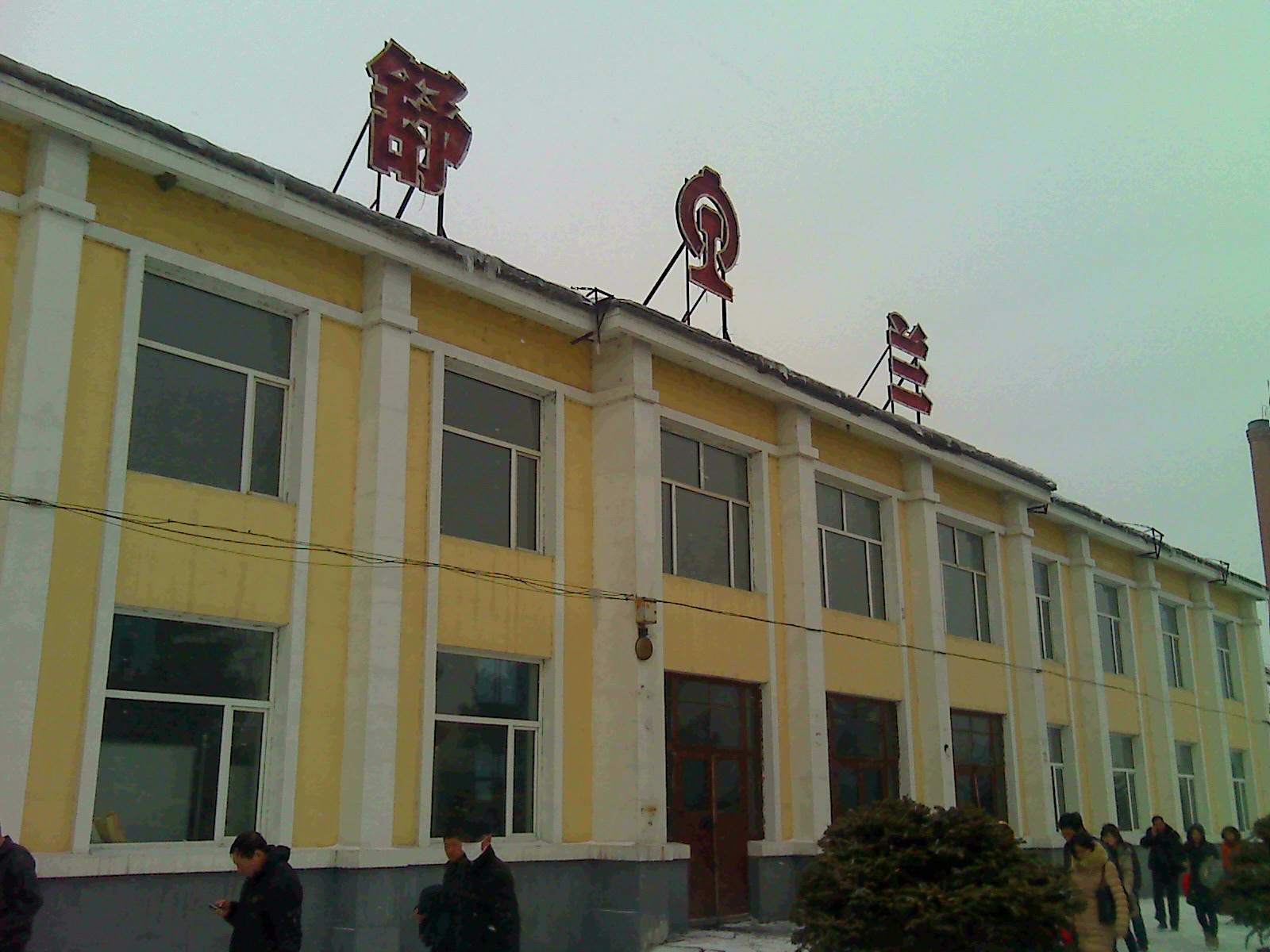

General information
- Other names: Shulan
- Location: Jilin City, Jilin; China
- Operator: China Railway Corporation
- Lines: Lafa–Harbin, Jilin–Shulan, Taolaizhao–Shulan

Other information
- Station code: TMIS code: 62744; Telegraph code: SLL; Pinyin code: SLA
Location

Shuiquliu railway station is a railway station of Lafa–Harbin Railway, Jilin–Shulan Railway and Taolaizhao–Shulan Railway. The station is located in the Shulan of Jilin, Jilin province, China.

== See also ==
- Lafa–Harbin Railway
- Jilin–Shulan Railway
- Taolaizhao–Shulan Railway
