= Shanhetun railway station =

Railway station in Harbin, China

Coordinates: 44.7120°N 127.2152°E

Shanhetun 山河屯

General information
- Other names: Shanhetun
- Location: Harbin, Heilongjiang; China
- Operator: China Railway Corporation
- Line: Lafa–Harbin
Location

Shanhetun railway station is a railway station of Lafa–Harbin Railway and located in the Wuchang of Harbin, Heilongjiang province, China.

== See also ==
- Lafa–Harbin Railway
