= Lalin railway station =

Railway station in Harbin, Heilongjiang, China

Coordinates: 45.2281°N 126.8901°E

Lalin 拉林

General information
- Other names: Lalin
- Location: Harbin, Heilongjiang; China
- Operator: China Railway Corporation
- Line: Lafa–Harbin
Location

Lalin railway station is a railway station of Lafa–Harbin Railway located in the Wuchang of Harbin, Heilongjiang province, China.

== See also ==
- Lafa–Harbin Railway
