= Longtan District =

Longtan District (龍潭區) may refer to:

- Longtan District, Jilin City, district in Jilin City, Jilin, China (People's Republic of China)
- Longtan District, Taoyuan, district in Taoyuan, Taiwan (Republic of China)
