= Liming railway station =

Railway station in Harbin, China

Liming 黎明

General information
- Other names: Liming
- Location: Harbin, Heilongjiang; China
- Operator: China Railway Corporation
- Line: Lafa–Harbin
Location

Liming railway station is a railway station of Lafa–Harbin Railway and located in the Xiangfang District of Harbin, Heilongjiang province, China.

== See also ==
- Lafa–Harbin Railway
