= Beiyinhe railway station =

Railway station in Harbin, China

Coordinates: 45.1679°N 126.9922°E

Beiyinhe 背荫河

General information
- Other names: Beiyinhe
- Location: Harbin, Heilongjiang; China
- Operator: China Railway Corporation
- Line: Lafa–Harbin
Location

Beiyinhe railway station is a railway station of Lafa–Harbin Railway and located in the Wuchang of Harbin, Heilongjiang province, China. The station was originally built in 1932.

== See also ==
- Lafa–Harbin Railway
