= Xiaoyu =

Xiaoyu is the pinyin spelling of a number of distinct Chinese masculine and feminine given names. These names are written with various Chinese characters, and may have differences in tone, so neither their pronunciations nor their meanings are identical. People with these names include:

- Wang Xiaoyu (王效禹, 1914–1995), Chinese male politician
- Zheng Xiaoyu (郑筱萸, 1944–2007), Chinese male government official executed for corruption
- Stella Chung (钟晓玉, born 1981), Malaysian female singer
- Zhang Xiaoyu (shot putter) (张小雨, born 1983), Chinese female shot putter
- Zhang Xiaoyu (张筱雨, born 1985), Chinese female internet celebrity and nude model
- Zhang Xiaoyu (footballer) (张小宇, born 1985), Chinese male footballer
- Liu Xiaoyu (swimmer) (刘晓宇, born 1988), Chinese female swimmer
- Liu Xiaoyu (basketball) (刘晓宇, born 1989), Chinese male basketball player
- Yu Xiaoyu (badminton) (于小渝, born 1992), Chinese male badminton player
- Liang Xiaoyu (梁晓宇, born 1996), Singaporean female badminton player
- Yu Xiaoyu (于小雨, born 1996), Chinese figure female skater
- Liu Xiaoyu (刘晓禹, born 1997), Canadian classical pianist

Fictional characters with this name include:

- Jiang Xiaoyu (江小魚), male character from the 2002 Taiwanese television show The Legendary Siblings 2
- Ling Xiaoyu (凌曉雨), female character from the Tekken video game series

== See also ==
- Xiao Yu (蕭瑀, 574–647), Tang Dynasty official
- Xiao Yu (singer) (born 1983), Taiwanese singer; Xiao Yu here means "Little Yu", and is a diminutive of his birth name Sung Nien-yu
