= Anjia railway station =

Railway station in Harbin, China

Coordinates: 45.0502°N 127.0614°E

Anjia 安家

General information
- Other names: Anjia
- Location: Harbin, Heilongjiang; China
- Operator: China Railway Corporation
- Line: Lafa–Harbin
Location

Anjia railway station is a railway station of Lafa–Harbin Railway and located in Wuchang, Harbin, Heilongjiang province, China.

== See also ==
- Lafa–Harbin Railway
