= Tang Jiali's Bodyart Photography =

Nude photography of Chinese model Tang Jiali

- Editors: Zhao Duoduo
- Author: Shi Song
- Cover artist: Cao Qian, Liu Yingrui
- Language: Chinese
- Genre: Nude photography
- Publisher: People's Fine Arts Publication House
- Publication date: November, 2003
- Publication place: China
- Media type: Paperback
- Pages: 124
- ISBN: 7-102-02863-6
- Preceded by: Tang Jiali's Nude Art (2002)
- Followed by: Tang Jiali Photography

Tang Jiali's Bodyart Photography (Chinese: 汤加丽人体艺术摄影) is a nude photography collection published by the People's Fine Arts Publishing House in November 2003, featuring Tang Jiali, a mainland Chinese dancer, actress, and bodyart model. Tang Jiali served as the model. The photo shoot, which started from May 2003, and finished by September 2003, was done by Shi Song, a female editor of the People's Fine Arts Publishing House who also acted as Tang Jiali's photographer. The book was published in November 2003.

== Background ==
In December 2002, Tang Jiali published Tang Jiali Nude Art photo album photographed by Zhang Xulong, which caused a sensation and controversy in mainland China at the time. Tang Jiali mentioned that she faced significant impact on both her career and personal life amidst the considerable public attention. According to Tang Jiali, many people at that time perceived her photos not as art but as pornography, which asserted her with considerable mental pressure. She stated that the officials at the People's Fine Arts Publishing House provided her with support and encouragement, convincing her that her work was indeed art. They invited her to create a second nude art photo album, to which Tang Jiali agreed. She expressed that her consent to produce the second album was to prove that her work was a form of art.

== Reception ==
The book was rated on Chinese Douban with score of 7.3 out of 10. Tang Jiali mentioned that this book differed from the previous one(Tang Jiali's Nude Art), as the female photographer Shi Song's style had better reflected the tender, feminine, and lifestyle side of Tang Jiali. Tang Jiali could adopt more daring poses and styles, due to the female photographer did not need to avoid depicting sensuality, unlike previous book which Tang Jiali worked with a male photographer.

However this book has been criticized for the use of photo editing. For instance, discrepancies were found in the shape and size of Tang Jiali's chest, waist, hips, and other parts of her body across different pages, as well as significant differences in body proportions compared to the previous book. Tang Jiali admitted to the existence of photo editing. The photographer of the previous work, Zhang Xulong, acknowledged that while photo retouching is common in the photography industry, the fact that it was discovered immediately after the publication of "Tang Jiali's Bodyart Photography" indicates a problem with the quality of the editing.

== Trivia ==
Tang Jiali fractured her spine in her photo shoot on a horseback in September 2003.

== See also ==
- Tang Jiali (model)
