= Zhoujia railway station =

Railway station in Harbin, China

Coordinates: 45.4597°N 126.6668°E

Zhoujia 周家

General information
- Other names: Zhoujia
- Location: Harbin, Heilongjiang; China
- Operator: China Railway, China Railway Corporation
- Line: Lafa–Harbin
Location

Zhoujia railway station is a railway station of Lafa–Harbin Railway and located in the Shuangcheng District of Harbin, Heilongjiang province, China.

== See also ==
- Lafa–Harbin Railway
