= Niujia railway station =

Railway station in Harbin, China

Coordinates: 45.3484°N 126.7305°E

Niujia 牛家

General information
- Other names: Niujia
- Location: Harbin, Heilongjiang; China
- Operator: China Railway Corporation
- Line: Lafa–Harbin
Location

Niujia railway station is a railway station of Lafa–Harbin Railway and located in the Wuchang of Harbin, Heilongjiang province, China.

== See also ==
- Lafa–Harbin Railway
