= Dujia railway station =

Railway station in Harbin, China

Coordinates: 44.8163°N 127.1920°E

Dujia 杜家

General information
- Other names: Dujia
- Location: Harbin, Heilongjiang; China
- Operator: China Railway Corporation
- Line: Lafa–Harbin
Location

Dujia railway station is a railway station of the Lafa–Harbin Railway located in Wuchang of Harbin, Heilongjiang province, China.

== See also ==
- Lafa–Harbin Railway
