= Jilin Ertaizi Airport =

Jilin Ertaizi Airport 吉林二台子机场
- IATA: JIL; ICAO: ZYJL

Summary
- Airport type: Military
- Serves: Jilin City, Jilin, China
- Coordinates: 44°00′08″N 126°23′44″E

Map
- Location of the airport JIL (China)

Runways
Direction	Length		Surface
Direction	m	ft	Surface
05/23	2,575	8,448	Concrete

Jilin Ertaizi Airport (Chinese: 吉林二台子机场) (IATA: JIL, ICAO: ZYJL) is a military airport that formerly served commercial flights to Jilin City in Jilin Province, China. On October 3, 2005, all of its commercial flights were transferred to the newly opened Changchun Longjia International Airport and Jilin Airport halted commercial operation.

In 2016, the government announced that Jilin Ertaizi Airport will be renovated and reopen for civil aviation in the future with developed facility which includes a new terminal, repaired runway, new taxiway and Changchun Rail Transit Line 1 will be extended to serve the airport.

== Facilities ==
The airport has one runway which is 2,575 metres (8,448 ft) long.
