= Zhang Xiaoyu =

Chinese internet celebrity (born 1985)

- 张筱雨
- Born: June 6, 1985 (age 41)
- Education: Beihua University
- Occupations: Model, Internet Celebrity
- Years active: 2008-2009
- Known for: Nude Modelling

Zhang Xiaoyu (simplified Chinese: 张筱雨; traditional Chinese: 張筱雨; pinyin: Zhāng Xiǎoyǔ; born June 6, 1985) is a Chinese internet celebrity who has been described as "China's first nude model."

== Early life and education ==
Zhang attended Beihua University in Jilin City, Jilin, where she graduated with a bachelor's degree in biological sciences in 2007.

== Career ==
She did softcore erotic modeling for METCN.com, an affiliate of MET ART, from 2007 to 2009, and until the Chinese government initiated a crackdown on online erotica at the beginning of 2009, her name was amongst the most searched for queries on the Chinese search engine Baidu, receiving an average of 650,000 searches a day throughout 2008.

The Chinese online game Dàhuà Xuānyuán (Chinese: 大话轩辕) became a hit in December 2009 after the game's producer hired Zhang as its spokesperson, a marketing maneuver that received official disapproval in 2010 as the Chinese government sought to curb the use of "vulgar marketing" by online game companies. On December 6, 2009, Zhang Xiaoyu announced on her blog that she would no longer shoot body art.
