= Taolaizhao–Shulan railway =

Railway line in Jilin, China

Taoshu Railway
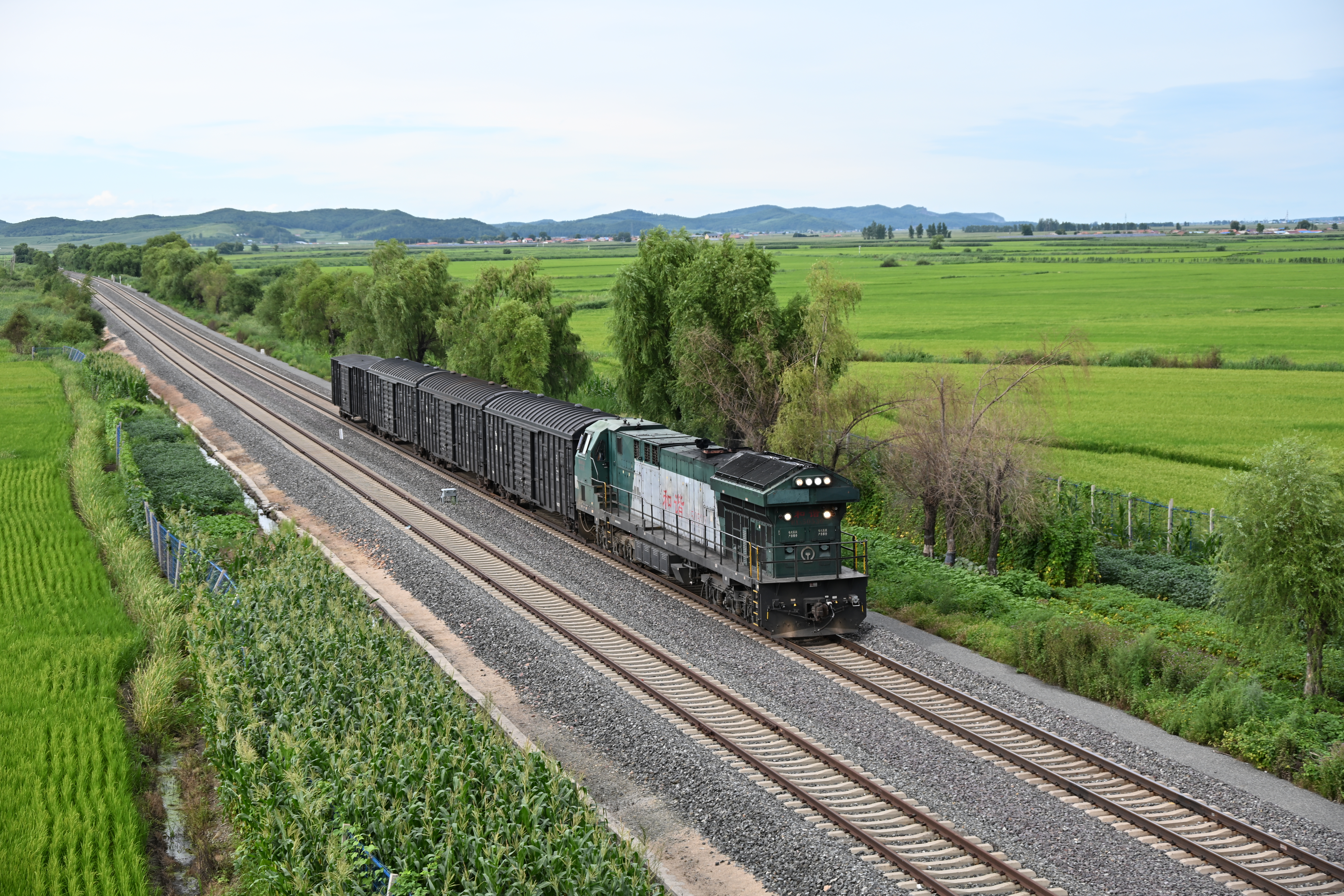
- Taolaizhao-Shulan Railway

Overview
- Native name: 陶舒铁路 (Táoshū Tiělù)
- Status: Operational
- Owner: Manchukuo National Railway (1943–1945); China Changchun Railway (1945–1955); China Railway (since 1955)
- Locale: Jilin
- Termini: Taolaizhao; Shulan

Service
- Type: Heavy rail, Regional rail

History
- Opened: 1943 (Taolaizhao–Yushu); 2009 (Yushu–Shulan)

Technical
- Line length: 117 km (73 mi)
- Track gauge: 1,435 mm (4 ft 8 1/2 in) standard gauge

The Taolaizhao–Shulan railway, named the Taoshu Railway (simplified Chinese: 陶舒铁路; traditional Chinese: 陶舒鐵路; pinyin: Táoshū Tiělù), is a 117 km (73 mi) single-track railway line in Northeast China between Taolaizhao and Shulan. At Taolaizhao it connects to the Jingha Railway, and at Shulan it connects to the Labin Railway and the Jishu Railway.

== History ==
The Taolaizhao–Yushu section of the line was originally built in 1943 by the Manchukuo National Railway as the Taoyu Line (Tōyu Line in Japanese). It was renamed Taoyu Railway by China Railway, and in 2009 it was extended from Yushu to Shulan to connect with the Labin Railway and the Jishu Railway. It received its current name at that time.

== Route ==
Distance		Station name			
Total; km	S2S; km	Current name	Former name	Opened	Connections
0	0	Taolaizhao 陶赖昭		1904	Jingha Railway, Songtao Railway (zh)
23	23	Wukeshu 五棵树		1943	
35	12	Liujiadian 刘家店		1943	
		~~Minjiatun~~; ~~闵家屯~~		1943	Closed
56	21	Yushu 榆树		1943	
77	21	Xinlizhen 新立镇		2009	
93	16	Xiejiazhen 谢家镇		2009	
117	24	Shulan		1933	Labin Railway, Jishu Railway
