= Harbin–Wuchang through train =

Railway service in China

The Harbin–Wuchang through train (Chinese: 哈尔滨到五常直通列车) is an express rail passenger service running between Harbin and Wuchang. These trains are Type 25B passenger trains operated by the Harbin Railway Bureau. They cover the 108 km distance on the Labin Railway, crossing Heilongjiang province.

== Train services ==
- 6231: Wuchang - Harbin East
- 6232: Xiangfang - Wuchang
- 6233: Wuchang - Harbin East
- 6234: Harbin East - Wuchang
- K7211: Wuchang - Xiangfang
- K7212: Xiangfang - Wuchang
- K7213: Wuchang - Xiangfang
- K7214: Xiangfang - Wuchang
- K7215: Wuchang - Xiangfang
- K7216: Xiangfang - Wuchang
- K7217: Wuchang - Xiangfang
- K7218: Xiangfang - Wuchang
