= Beihua University =

Provincial public university in Jilin, China

- 北华大学
- Established: 1906 (as Jilin Medical College); 1999 (merger)
- Location: Jilin City, Jilin, China; 43.8088°N 126.5633°E
- Website: www.beihua.edu.cn

Beihua University (北华大学) is a provincial public university in Jilin City, Jilin, China. The university is affiliated with the Jilin Provincial Government.

Developing from 1906 and through the merger of three colleges in 1999, now Beihua University has become a university with three campuses, which together occupy an area of 1,263,700 m^{2} (13,602,000 sq ft) with a floor space up to 830,300 m^{2} (8,937,000 sq ft).
