= Tang Jiali (model) =

Chinese dancer and model (born 1976)

- Born: July 13, 1976 (age 50); Anhui, Hefei, China
- Occupations: Nude model; Actress; Dancer; Singer
- Spouse: Shen Dong (m. 1998; div. 2007)

Tang Jiali (simplified Chinese: 汤加丽; traditional Chinese: 湯加麗; pinyin: Tāng Jiālì; born July 13, 1976, in Hefei, Anhui), is a Chinese dancer, nude art model, actress and singer. She graduated from the Classical Dance Department of the Beijing Dance Academy and worked as a dancer and instructor with a national-level song and dance troupe.

In 2002, she published an art nude photography book titled Tang Jiali Art Nude Photography (汤加丽人体艺术写真) by People's Fine Arts Publishing House, with photography by Zhang Xulong. In 2003, she released another art nude photography book, Tang Jiali Art Nude Photography, followed by Tang Jiali Portraits (汤加丽人体艺术摄影) by Shi Song in 2004. In 2005, she published the biography Tang Jiali's Portrait Diary (汤加丽写真日记), which described her journey and experiences as an art nude model. In 2006, she released the art documentary titled Dancer Jiali (舞者·加丽).

In these works, Tang often appeared in full frontal nudity, which sparked controversy in Chinese society at the time. Starting from the publication of her second book, Tang Jiali Art Nude Photography, in 2004, her photos gained significant attention and became highly searched in search engine Baidu.

== Nude art photography ==
=== Tang Jiali Art Nude Photography ===
In September 2002, Tang published her first photography collection, Tang Jiali Art Nude Photography, with the aim of preserving her beauty of youth. Although it gained significant attention, it also faced criticism and backlash, leading to pressure and debates over whether her work was considered art or pornography. As a result of her work, Tang lost her job with the Eastern Song and Dance Troupe, and her job opportunities were restricted. She mentioned that her father initially opposed her nude modeling but later came to understand and forgive her.

==== Legal disputes ====
Before the publication of her book, Tang claimed that she designed 90% of the poses in her first photography collection. However, after the book was published, she stated that she was forced into the process. The photographer, Zhang Xulong, contradicted her claims, stating that he was responsible for the creative design of the poses and that Tang voluntarily signed a contract for the photoshoot. This dispute led to legal issues between Zhang Xulong and People's Fine Arts Publishing House. Eventually, the publishing house was ordered to publicly apologize to Zhang Xulong and stop using Tang's name as the author in reprints. Some photos in the book were edited by Tang without Zhang Xulong's authorization, leading to a copyright dispute between her and Zhang Xulong, resulting in Tang being ordered to compensate Zhang Xulong and apologize.

==== Reception ====
Photographer Zhang Xulong expressed confusion over the criticism of Tang Jiali Art Nude Photography. He believed it was a legitimate art nude work, emphasizing the importance of a proper appreciation attitude. The book's editor, Guan Hong, considered that Tang's choices in attire and black-and-white photography demonstrated innovative and avant-garde ideas. Some reviewers found Tang's photos to exude an Eastern charm, characterized by elegance, naturalness, and a calm expression. Although her work explored female beauty and sensuality, it prioritized a natural, gentle, and aesthetic portrayal, avoiding overtly sexual associations.

=== Tang Jiali Art Nude Photography ===
==== Motivation of publication ====
After the controversy surrounding her first photography collection, and with the consolation and guidance of People's Fine Arts Publishing House leadership, Tang voluntarily created a second art nude collection titled "Tang Jiali Art Nude Photography" to prove that her art was not pornography but genuine art.

==== Style transformation ====
The photographer for "Tang Jiali Art Nude Photography" was Shi Song, a female editor at People's Fine Arts Publishing House. Tang explained that compared to the dynamic, body language-focused, and tension-oriented style of her first collection by male photographer Zhang Xulong, "Tang Jiali Art Nude Photography" by female photographer Shi Song better portrayed her tender, feminine, and life style, without hesitation in using bolder poses in this collection, due to female photographer didn't have to avoid portraying her sexual side. Some viewers questioned whether the second collection was more pornographic, but Tang defended it as being livelier, more uplifting, and vibrant, rather than more pornographic.

==== Critics over professionalism ====
Photographer Zhang Xulong, responsible for Tang Jiali Art Nude Photography, argued that Shi Song was not a professional photographer and that the photos in "Tang Jiali Art Nude Photography" had been digitally processed, losing their creative photographic essence.

== See also ==
- Zhang Xiaoyu
