= Jiuzhan–Jiangmifeng railway =

Railway line in Jilin, China

Jiuzhan–Jiangmifeng railway or Jiujiang railway (simplified Chinese: 九江铁路; traditional Chinese: 九江鐵路; pinyin: Jĺujiāng tiělù), is a single-track arterial railroad in Northeast China. The 26 km (16 mi) long railway connects Jiuzhan to Jiangmifeng.

== Rail junctions ==
- Xinjiuzhan: Changchun–Tumen railway
- Jiangmifeng: Changchun–Tumen railway

== See also ==
- List of railways in China
