= Longtan, Jilin City =

Coordinates: 43°54′39″N 126°33′44″E

Longtan 龙潭区
- District
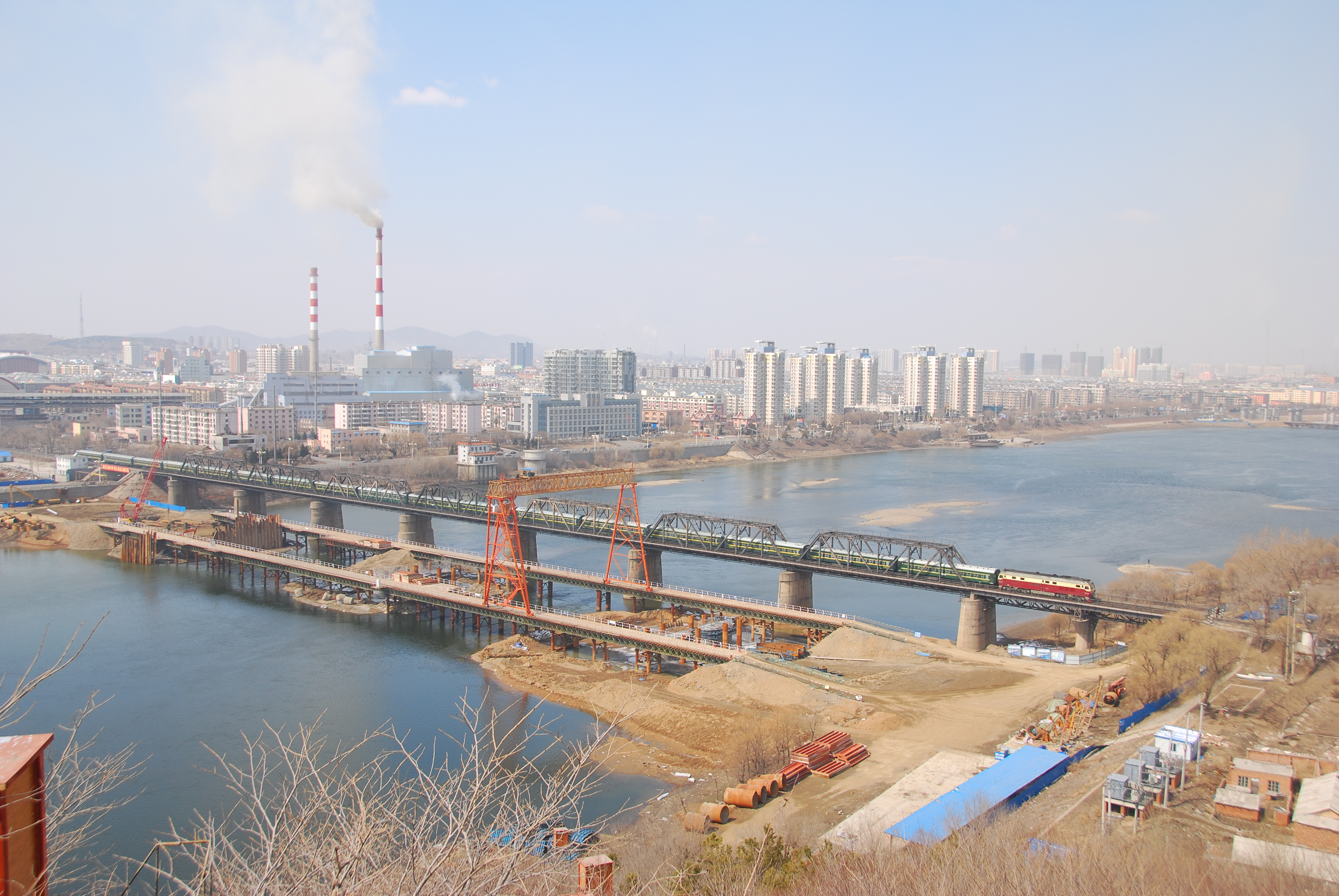

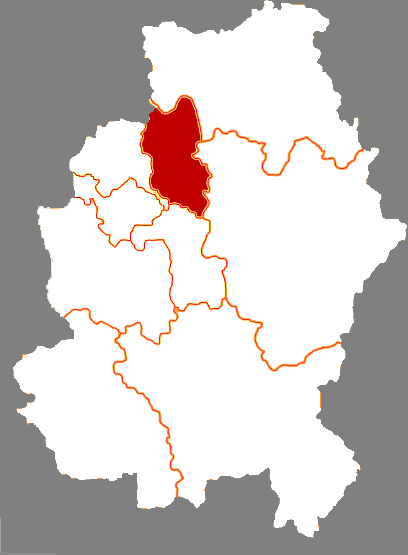
- Location in Jilin City
- Country: People's Republic of China
- Province: Jilin
- Prefecture-level city: Jilin City
- Seat: Zunyi Subdistrict (遵义街道)
- Time zone: UTC+8 (China Standard)

Longtan District (simplified Chinese: 龙潭区; traditional Chinese: 龍潭區; pinyin: Lóngtán Qū) is a district of Jilin City, Jilin, People's Republic of China.

== Administrative Divisions ==
Subdistricts:

- Zunyi Subdistrict (遵义街道), Longtan Subdistrict (龙潭街道), Xin'an Subdistrict (新安街道), Longhua Subdistrict (龙华街道), Hanyang Subdistrict (汉阳街道), Baoziyan Subdistrict (泡子沿街道), Kaoshan Subdistrict (靠山街道), Shanqian Subdistrict (山前街道), New Jilin Subdistrict (新吉林街道), Tuchengzi Subdistrict (土城子街道), Tiedong Subdistrict (铁东街道), Yushu Subdistrict (榆树街道)

The only town is Wulajie Manchu Ethnic Town (乌拉街满族镇)

Townships:

- Jinzhu Township (金珠乡), Jiangbei Township (江北乡), Longtan Township (龙潭乡)
