= Lafa–Harbin railway =

Railway line in Northeast China

Labin Railway
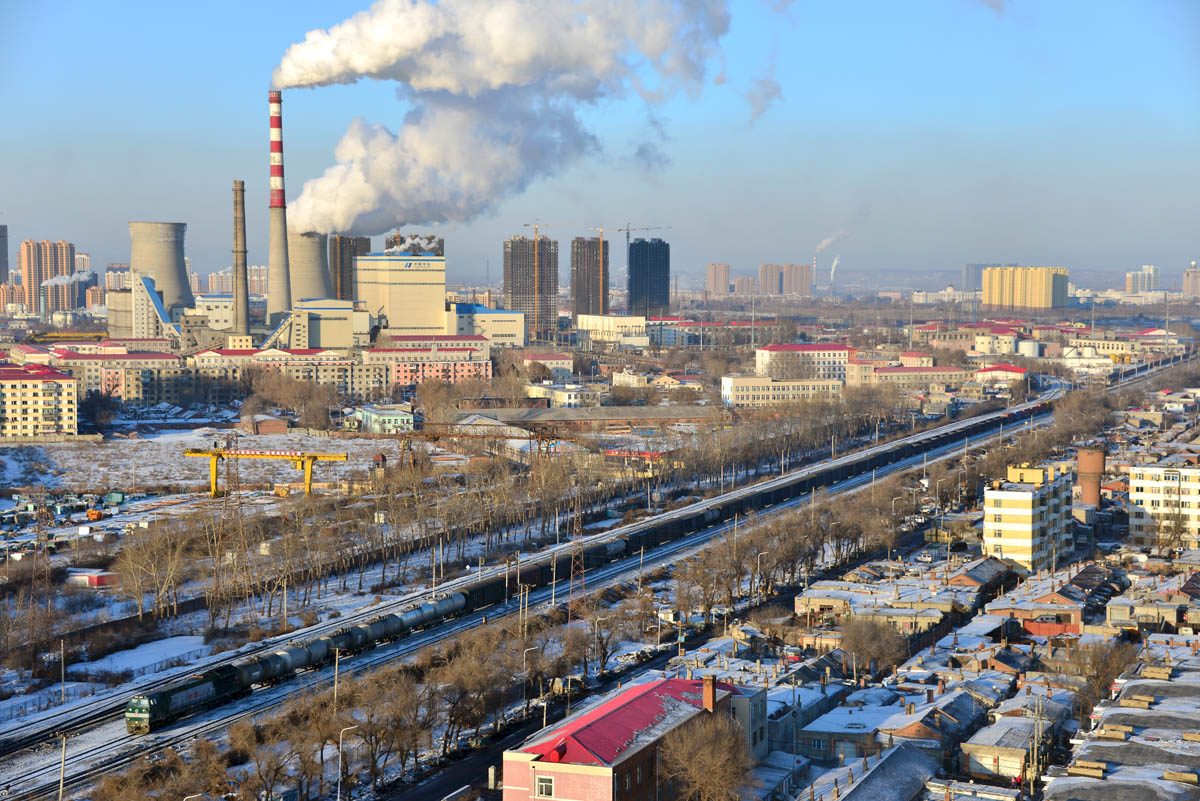

Overview
- Native name: 拉滨铁路 (Lābīn Tiělù)
- Status: Operational
- Owner: Manchukuo National Railway (1934–1945); China Changchun Railway (1945–1955); China Railway (since 1955)
- Locale: Heilongjiang, Inner Mongolia
- Termini: Binjiang; Lafa

Service
- Type: Heavy rail, Regional rail

History
- Opened: 1 September 1934

Technical
- Line length: 271.7 km (168.8 mi)
- Track gauge: 1,435 mm (4 ft 8 1/2 in) standard gauge

The Lafa–Harbin railway, named the Labin Railway (simplified Chinese: 拉滨铁路; traditional Chinese: 拉濱鐵路; pinyin: Lābīn Tiělù), is a 272 km (169 mi) single-track trunk railway in Northeast China, running from Lafa to Binjiang via Harbin. It connects to the Changtu Railway at Lafa, to the Jishu Railway and the Taoshu Railway at Shulan, to the Binsui Railway and the Hahuan Line at Xiangfang, and at Harbin to the Binbei Railway, the Binzhou Railway, and the Jingha Railway.

== History ==
The line, originally named the Labin Line (Rōhin Line in Japanese), was built by the Manchukuo National Railway between 1932 and 1934, and officially opened on 1 September 1934. The Harbin–Binjiang section was originally built by the North Manchuria Railway, and whilst under the management of the Manchukuo National Railway it was part of the Binjiang Line. After the Soviet invasion of Manchuria in 1945 it was taken over by the Soviet Army, and from then until 1955 it was operated by the Sino-Soviet China Changchun Railway. After 1955 it was merged into China Railway and renamed Labin Railway, and is now jointly administered by the Harbin and Shenyang Railway Bureaux.

== Route ==
Distance		Station name			
Total; km	S2S; km	Current name	Former name	Opened	Connections
0	0	Lafa 拉法		1928	Changtu Railway
8	8	Xinzhan 新站		1928	
19	11	Liujiazi 六家子		1928	
28	9	~~Ma'anling~~; ~~马鞍岭~~		1928	Closed
41	13	Shangying 上营		1933	
53	12	~~Xiaocheng~~; ~~小城~~			Closed
68	15	~~Qunling~~; ~~群岭~~			Closed
81	13	Shulan 舒兰		1933	Jishu Railway, Taoshu Railway
96	15	Shuiquliu 水曲柳		1933	
110	14	Ping'an 平安		1934	
122	12	Shanhetun 山河屯		1933	
138	16	Dujia 杜家		1933	
151	13	Wuchang 五常		1933	
167	16	Anjia 安家		1934	
182	15	Beiyinhe 背荫河		1934	
193	11	Lalin 拉林		1934	
211	18	Niujia 牛家		1934	
225	14	Zhoujia 周家		1934	
241	16	Pingfang 平房		1934	
		Liming 黎明		1984	Freight only
254	13	Sunjia 孙家		1934	Wangsun Railway (zh)
259	5	Xiangfang 香坊	Harbin (哈尔滨/Харбин), 1898–1904; Old Harbin (老哈尔滨/Старый Харбин), 1904–1924	1898	Binsui Railway, Hahuan Line
261	2	Wangzhaotun 王兆屯	Muchaichang 木柴厂	1899	Binsui Railway, Hahuan Line
266	5	Harbin 哈尔滨	Songhuajiang 松花江	1899	Binbei Railway, Jingha Railway, Binzhou Railway
271.7	6	Binjiang 滨江		1934	Sankeshu Railway (zh)

== See also ==
- Harbin–Wuchang through train
