= Jilin–Shulan railway =

Railway line in China

Jishu Railway

Overview
- Native name: 吉舒铁路 (Jíshū Tiělù)
- Status: Operational
- Owner: Manchukuo National Railway (1941–1945); China Railway (since 1958)
- Locale: Jilin
- Termini: Jilin; Shulan

Service
- Type: Heavy rail, Regional rail

History
- Opened: 1941
- Closed: 1945
- Reopened: 1958

Technical
- Line length: 90 km (56 mi)
- Track gauge: 1,435 mm (4 ft 8 1/2 in) standard gauge

The Jilin–Shulan railway, named the Jishu Railway (simplified Chinese: 吉舒铁路; traditional Chinese: 吉舒鐵路; pinyin: Jíshū Tiělù), is a 90 km (56 mi) single-track railway line in Northeast China running from Jilin to Shulan. At Jilin, which is the terminus of the Shenji Railway, it connects to the Changtu Railway and the Changhun Intercity Railway, and at Shulan it connects to the Labin Railway and the Taoshu Railway.

== History ==
The railway line between Longtanshan and Shulan, named the Longshu Line, was originally created in 1941 by the Manchukuo National Railway, by building a new stretch of railway to connect the Jilin–Jinzhu Jinzhu Line with the Meiyao–Shulan Meiyao Line, both of which had been built by the privately owned Jilin Railway. This line was destroyed in 1945 during the Soviet invasion of Manchuria. China Railway rebuilt the line between 1958 and 1966, as the distance between Jilin and Harbin is 68 km (42 mi) shorter via this route than via the Labin Railway.

== Route ==
| Distance | | Station name | | | |
| Total; km | S2S; km | Current name | Former name | Opened | Connections |
|---|---|---|---|---|---|
| 0 | 0 | Jilin 吉林 | Dongguan 東關 | 1928 | Changtu Railway (zh), Shenji Railway (zh), Changhun ICR (zh) |
| 4 | 4 | Longtanshan 龙潭山 | | 1927 | Changtu Railway (zh), Longfeng Railway (zh) |
| 7 | 3 | Jiangbei 江北 | | 1938 | Changtu Railway (zh) |
| 12 | 5 | Jilin North 吉林北 | | 1958 | |
| 19 | 7 | Qipan 棋盘 | | 1966 | |
| | | ~~Lixin~~; ~~立新~~ | | | Closed |
| 25 | 6 | Jinzhu 金珠 | | | |
| 30 | 5 | Yafu 亚复 | | 1966 | |
| | | ~~Zhanglao~~; ~~张老~~ | | | Closed |
| 43 | 13 | Dakouqin 大口钦 | | 1966 | |
| 48 | 5 | Qianyao 前窑 | | 1966 | |
| | | ~~Gangyao~~; ~~缸窑~~ | ~~Meiyao~~; ~~煤窯~~ | | Closed, former Meiyao Line |
| 59 | 11 | Fengguang 丰广 | | 1960 | |
| | | ~~Tianhe~~; ~~天合~~ | | | Closed, former Meiyao Line |
| 69 | 10 | Jishu 吉舒 | | 1960 | |
| | | ~~Moshi~~; ~~磨石~~ | | | Closed, former Meiyao Line |
| 82 | 13 | Dongfu 东富 | | 1960 | |
| | | ~~Sandaohe~~; ~~三道河~~ | | | Closed, former Meiyao Line |
| 90 | 8 | Shulan | | 1933 | Labin Railway, Taoshu Railway |
