= Jilin City =

Jilin 吉林市 Chi-lin, Kirin
- Prefecture-level city
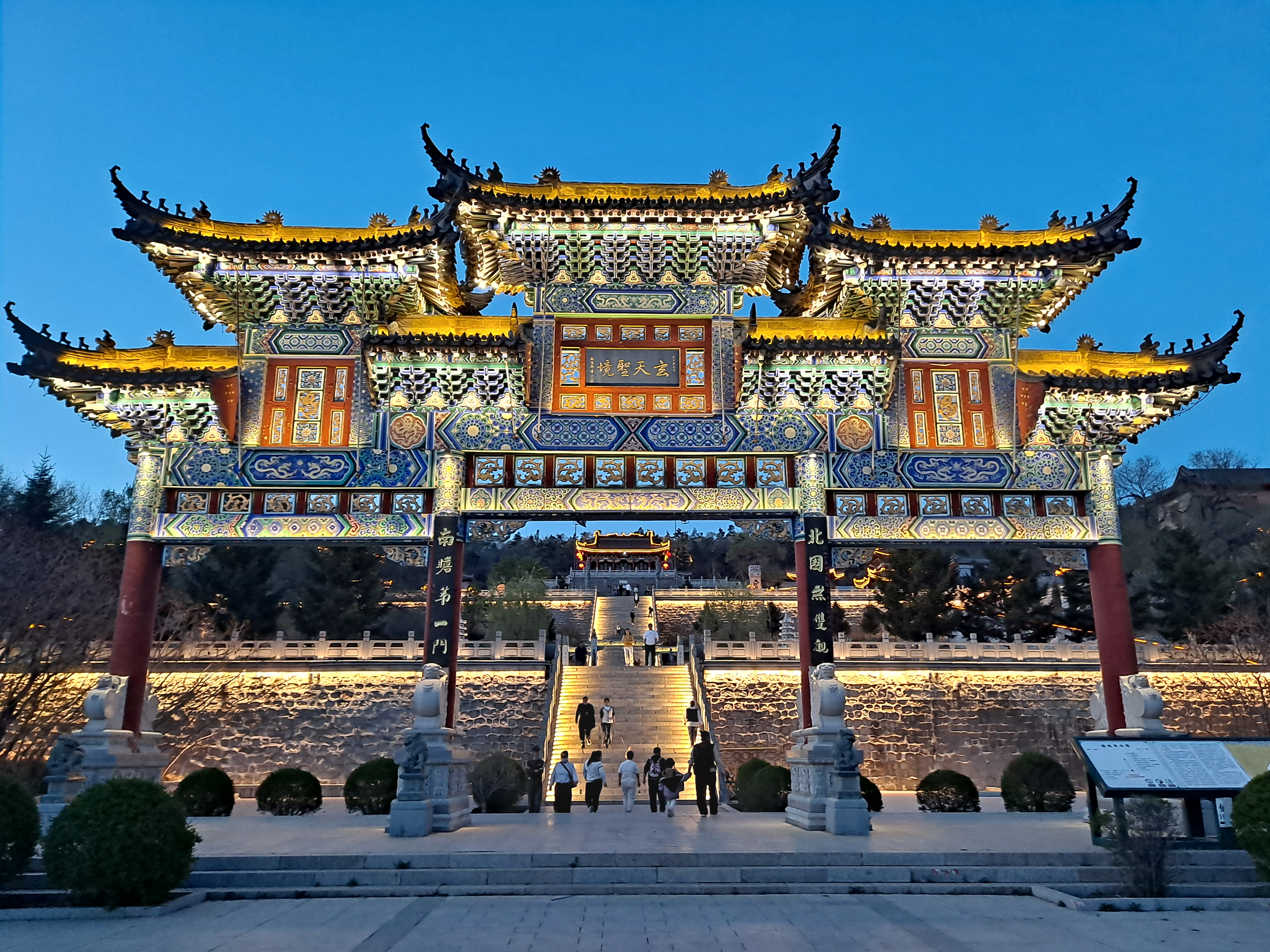
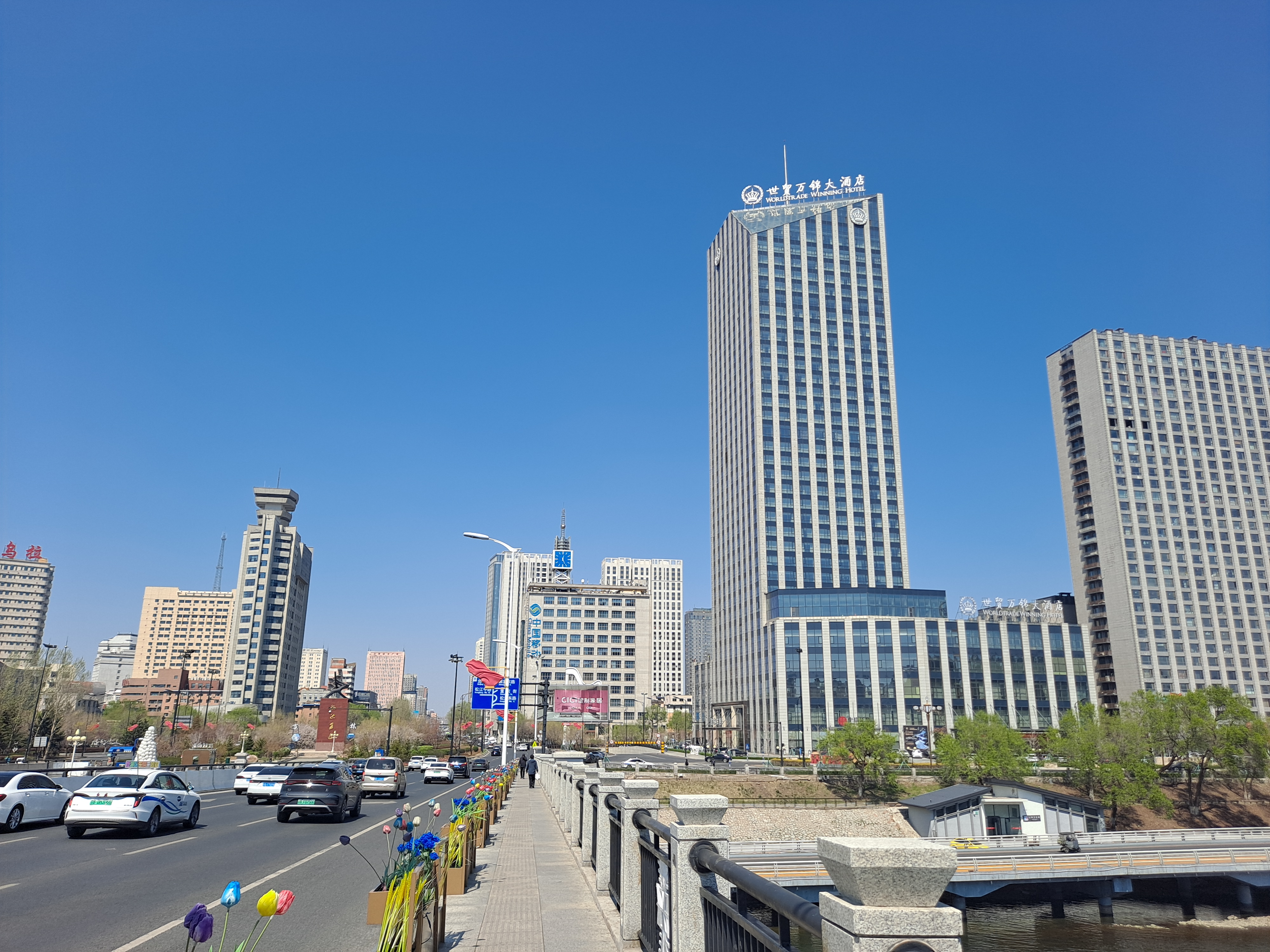
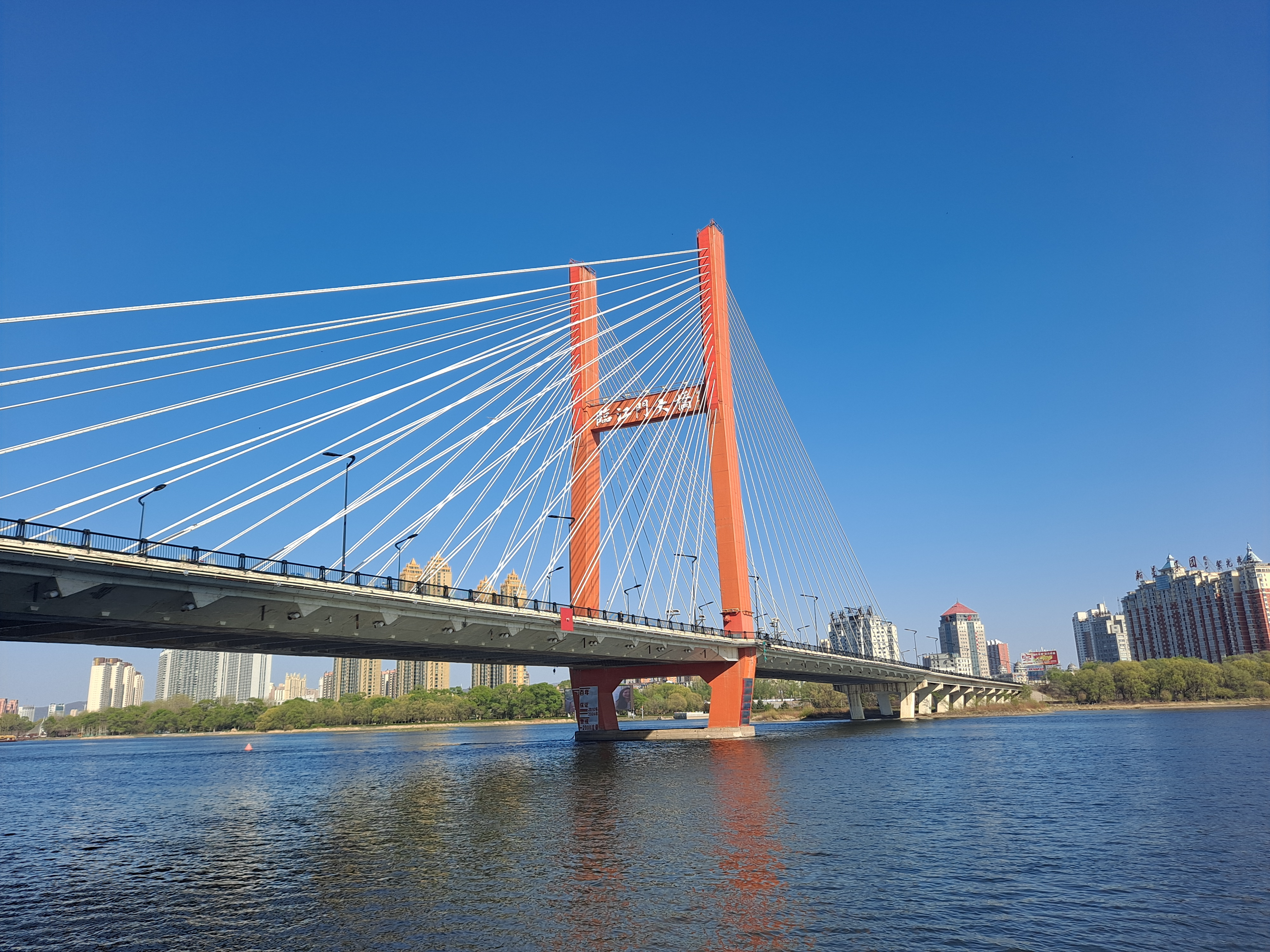
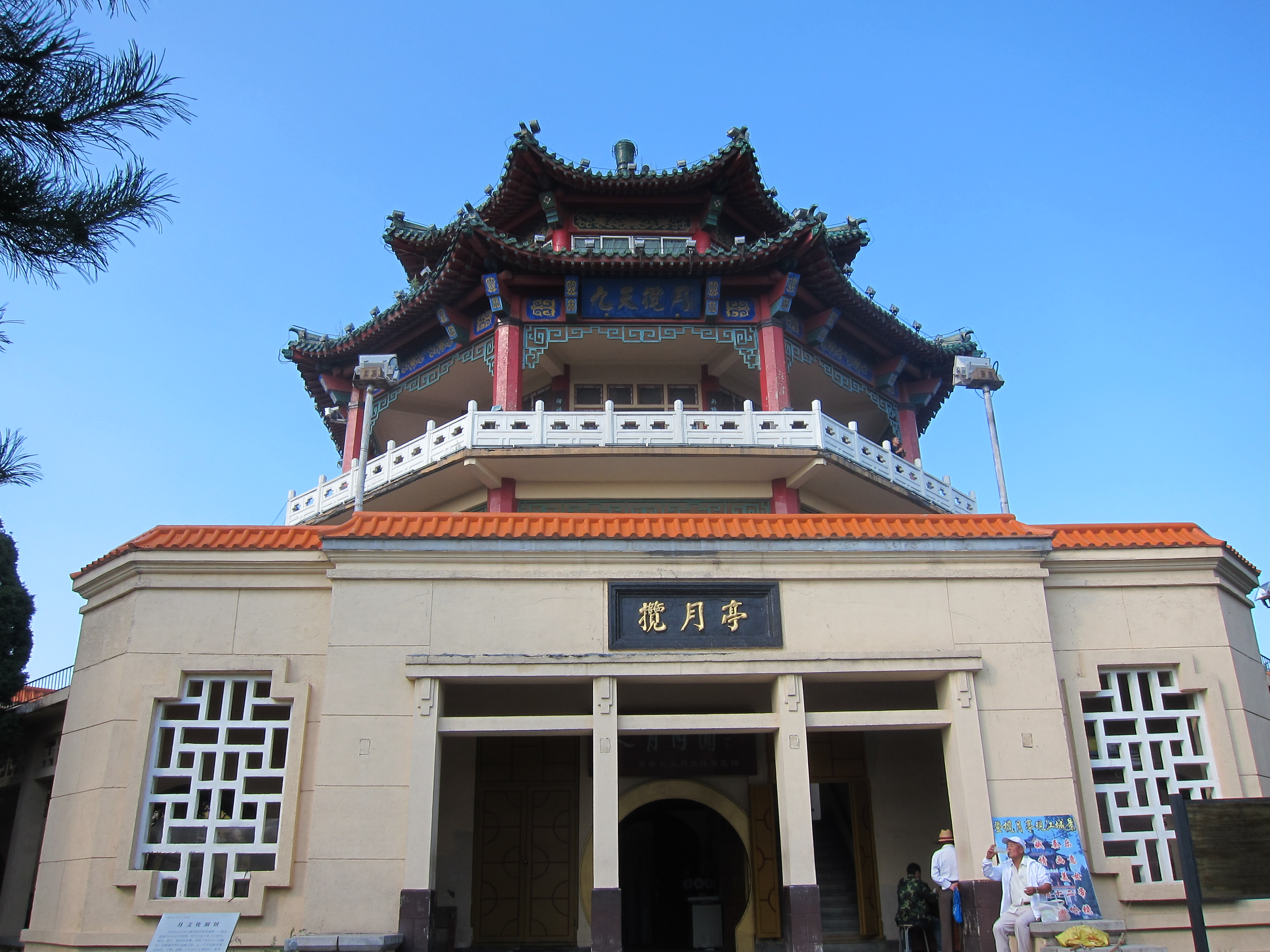
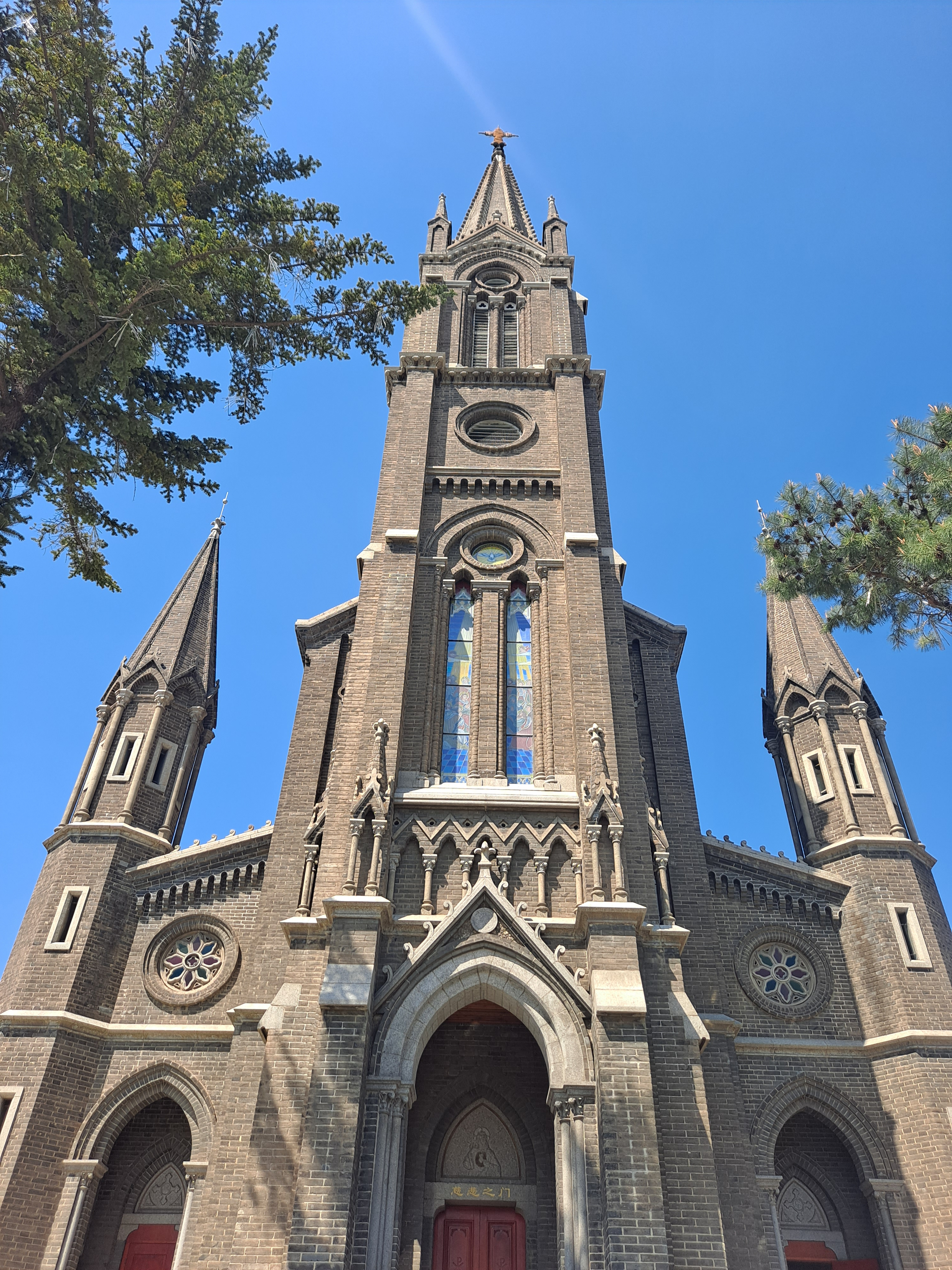
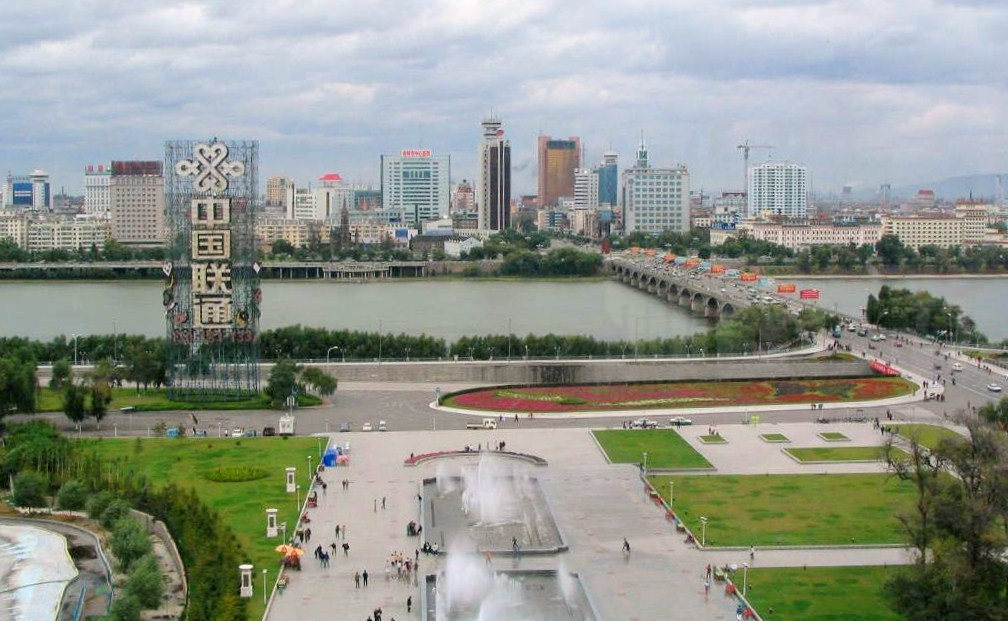
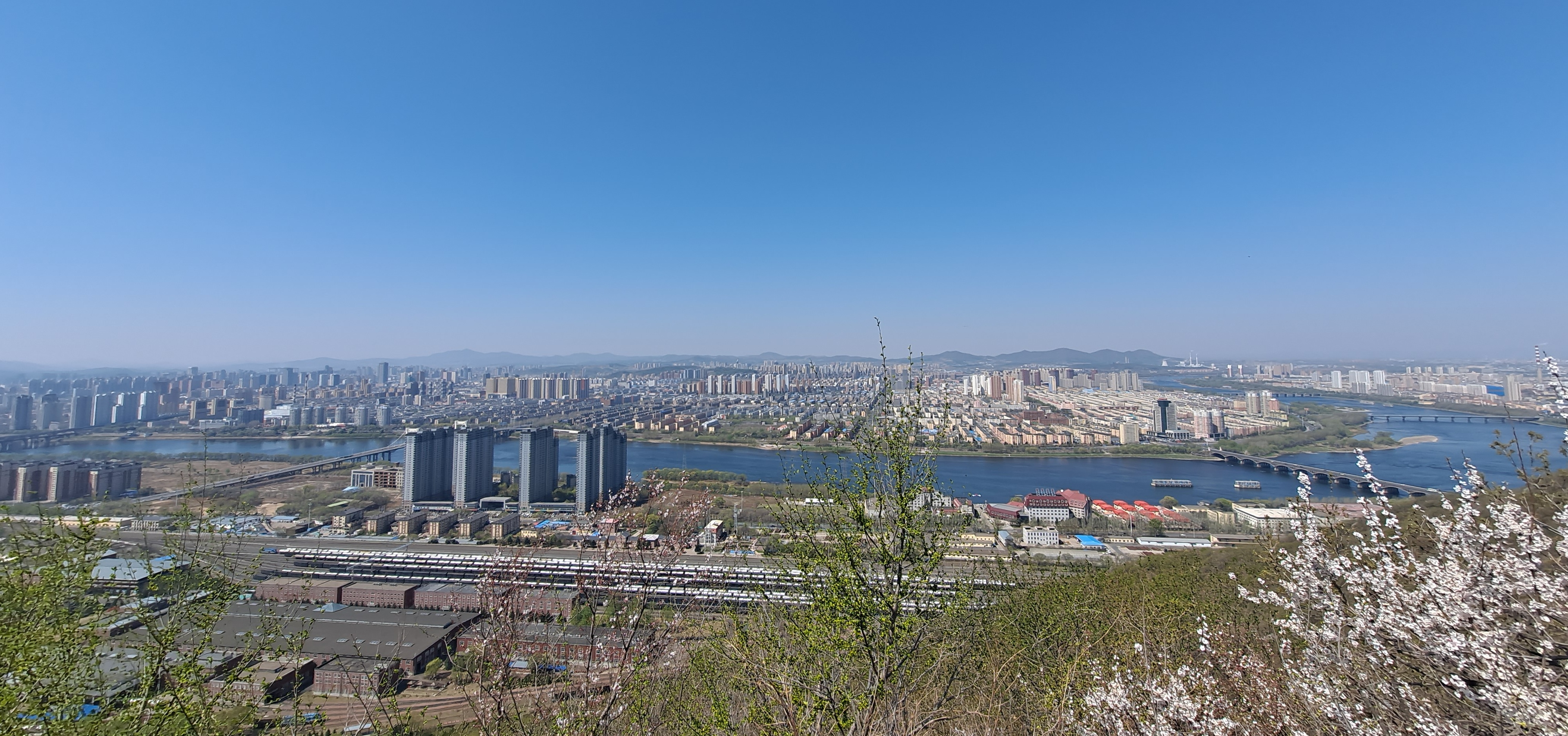
- Jilin Xuandi Temple Skyline of Jiangcheng Square Linjiangmen Bridge Lanyue Pavilion in the Beishan Scenic Area Sacred Heart Cathedral Century Square and Jilin Bridge View of the city from Longshan
- Nickname: River City (江城)
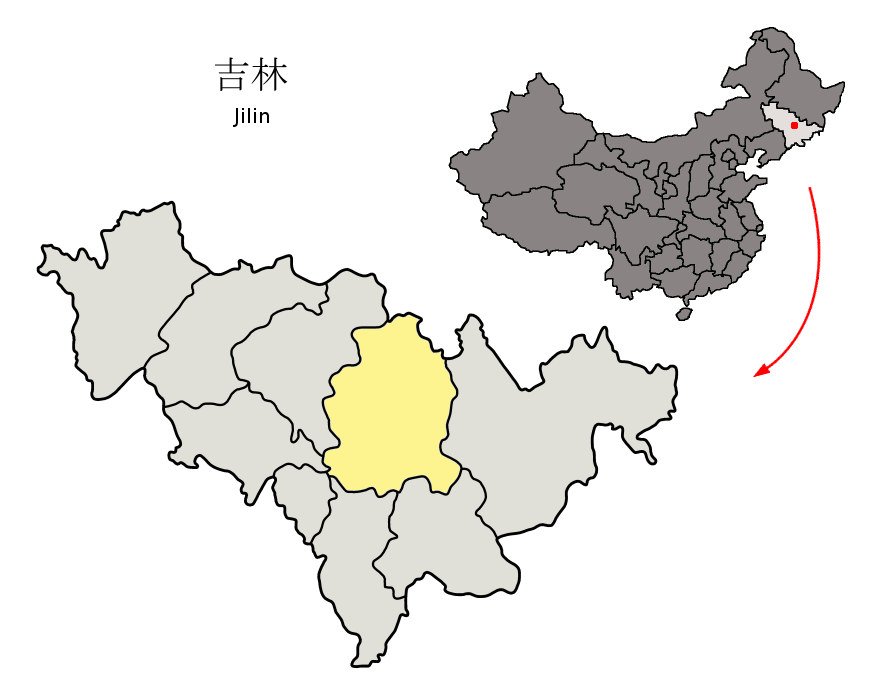
- Location Jilin City (yellow) in Jilin Province (light grey) and China

- Location of the city centre in Jilin
- Coordinates (Jilin City government): 43°50′17″N 126°32′59″E
- Country: People's Republic of China
- Province: Jilin
- County-level divisions: 9
- Established: 1673
- Municipal seat: Chuanying District

Government
  - Type: Prefecture-level city
  - CPC Jilin City Secretary: Zhao Jingbo (赵静波)
  - Mayor: Zhang Huanqiu (张焕秋)

Area
  - Prefecture-level city: 27,166.37 km^{2} (10,488.99 sq mi)
  - Urban: 3,663.9 km^{2} (1,414.6 sq mi)
  - Metro: 3,663.9 km^{2} (1,414.6 sq mi)
- Elevation: 202 m (663 ft)

Population (2020 census)
  - Prefecture-level city: 3,623,713
  - Density: 133.3897/km^{2} (345.4776/sq mi)
  - Urban: 1,895,865
  - Urban density: 517.44/km^{2} (1,340.2/sq mi)
  - Metro: 1,895,865
  - Metro density: 517.44/km^{2} (1,340.2/sq mi)

GDP
  - Prefecture-level city: CN¥ 239.4 billion US$ 38.4 billion
  - Per capita: CN¥ 56,077; US$ 9,003
- Time zone: UTC+8 (China Standard)
- Postal code: 132000
- Area code: 0432
- ISO 3166 code: CN-JL-02
- Major Nationalities: Han, Manchu, Korean, Hui
- Licence plates: 吉B
- Website: www.jlcity.gov.cn

Jilin
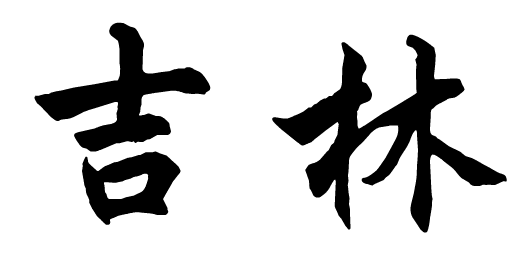
- "Jilin", as written in Chinese

Chinese name
- Chinese: 吉林
- Postal: Kirin
Transcriptions
Standard Mandarin
- Hanyu Pinyin: Jílín
- Wade–Giles: Chi^{2}-lin^{2}

Manchu name
- Manchu script: ᡤᡳᡵᡳᠨ ᡠᠯᠠ ᡥᠣᡨᠣᠨ
- Romanization: Girin'ula hoton

Jilin City (Note: Chinese: 吉林市; pinyin: Jílín Shì, Mandarin pronunciation: [tɕǐlǐn]; alternately romanized as Kirin (Manchu: ᡤᡳᡵᡳᠨ, IPA:/ki.rin/)) is the second-largest city and former capital of Jilin province in northeast China. As of the 2020 census, 3,623,713 people resided within its administrative area of 27,166.37 square kilometres (10,488.99 sq mi) and 1,895,865 in its built-up (or metro) area consisting of four urban districts. A prefecture-level city, it is the only major city nationally that shares its name with its province.

Jilin City is also known as the River City because of the Songhua River surrounding much of the city. In 2007, it co-hosted the Asian Winter Games.

== History ==
Jilin City is one of the oldest cities in Northeast China.

During the reign of the Yongle Emperor in the Ming dynasty, efforts were made to expand Ming control throughout all of Manchuria. Mighty river fleets were built and sailed several times from Jilin City, getting the chieftains of the local tribes to swear allegiance to the Ming rulers. Soon after the establishment of the Manchu-led Qing dynasty, the territory of today's Primorsky Kray was put under the administration of Jilin. As the Russian Empire advanced eastward to the Pacific coast, the Qing government ordered a naval shipbuilding factory to be set up here in 1661. Jilin was officially established as a fort city in 1673 when Anzhuhu (安珠瑚), the Deputy Lieutenant-General (副都统), was ordered to build a castle in Jilin. In 1676, the Military Governor of Ninguta was transferred to Jilin City because of its more convenient location and increasing military importance, while the former Deputy Lieutenant-General was transferred in the opposite direction to Ninguta. Since then Jilin City has developed at a rapid pace. The nickname of Jilin City is River City (江城), which originates from one sentence "连樯接舰屯江城" of a poem written by Kangxi Emperor when he was visiting Jilin City in 1682. Jilin retained its importance into the 18th and 19th century as one of the few cities existing beyond the Willow Palisade, along with Qiqihar, Ninguta and Mukden.

After Manchukuo established its capital in Xinjing (present-day Changchun), Jilin City's importance decreased. By 1940, Jilin's population was 173,624, while Xinjing's population reached 544,202 at the same time. Soviet forces captured Jilin during the August Storm operation.

Jilin became the provincial capital of Jilin Province after the establishment of the People's Republic of China in 1949, until Changchun took this position in 1956.

== Geography ==
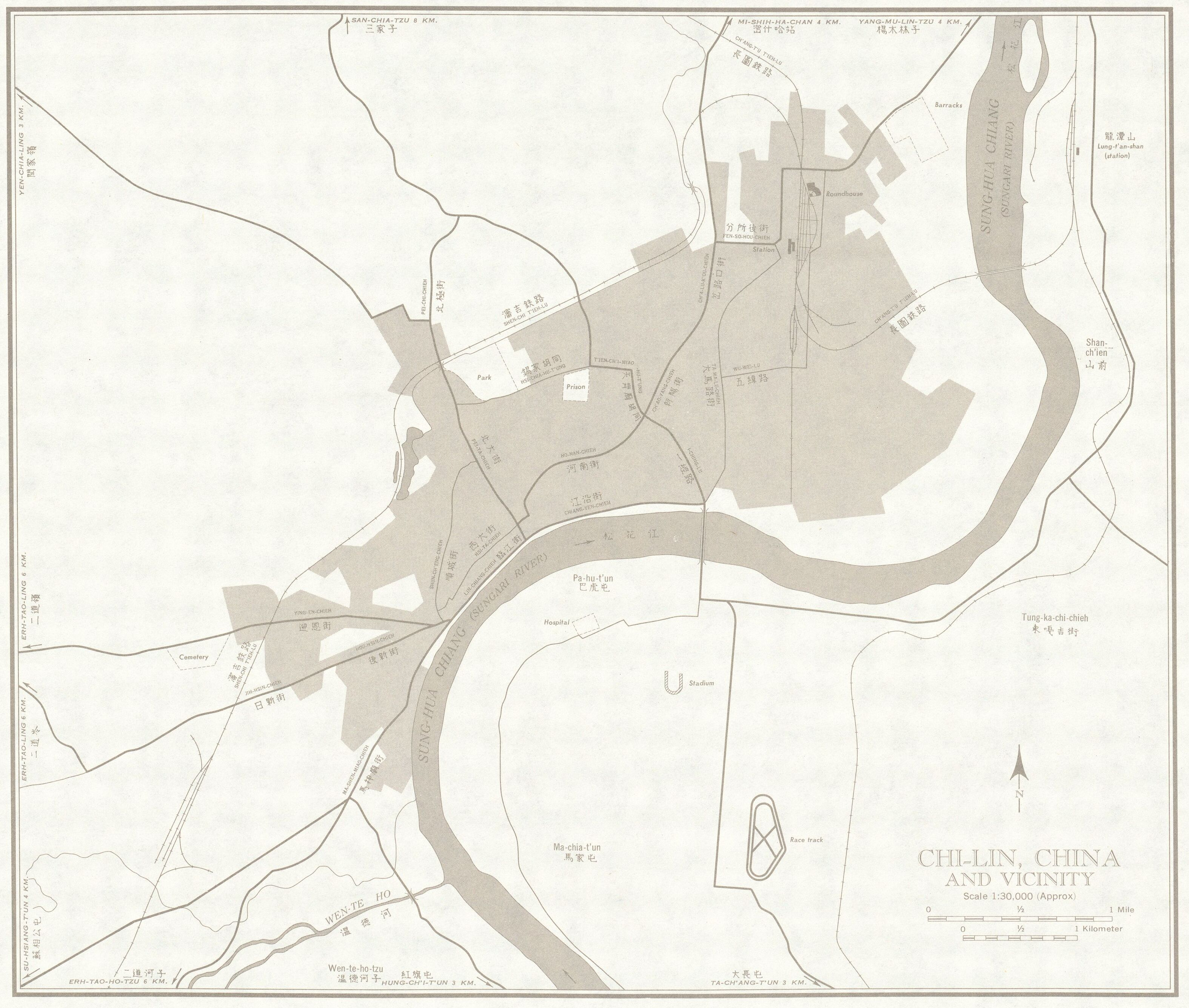
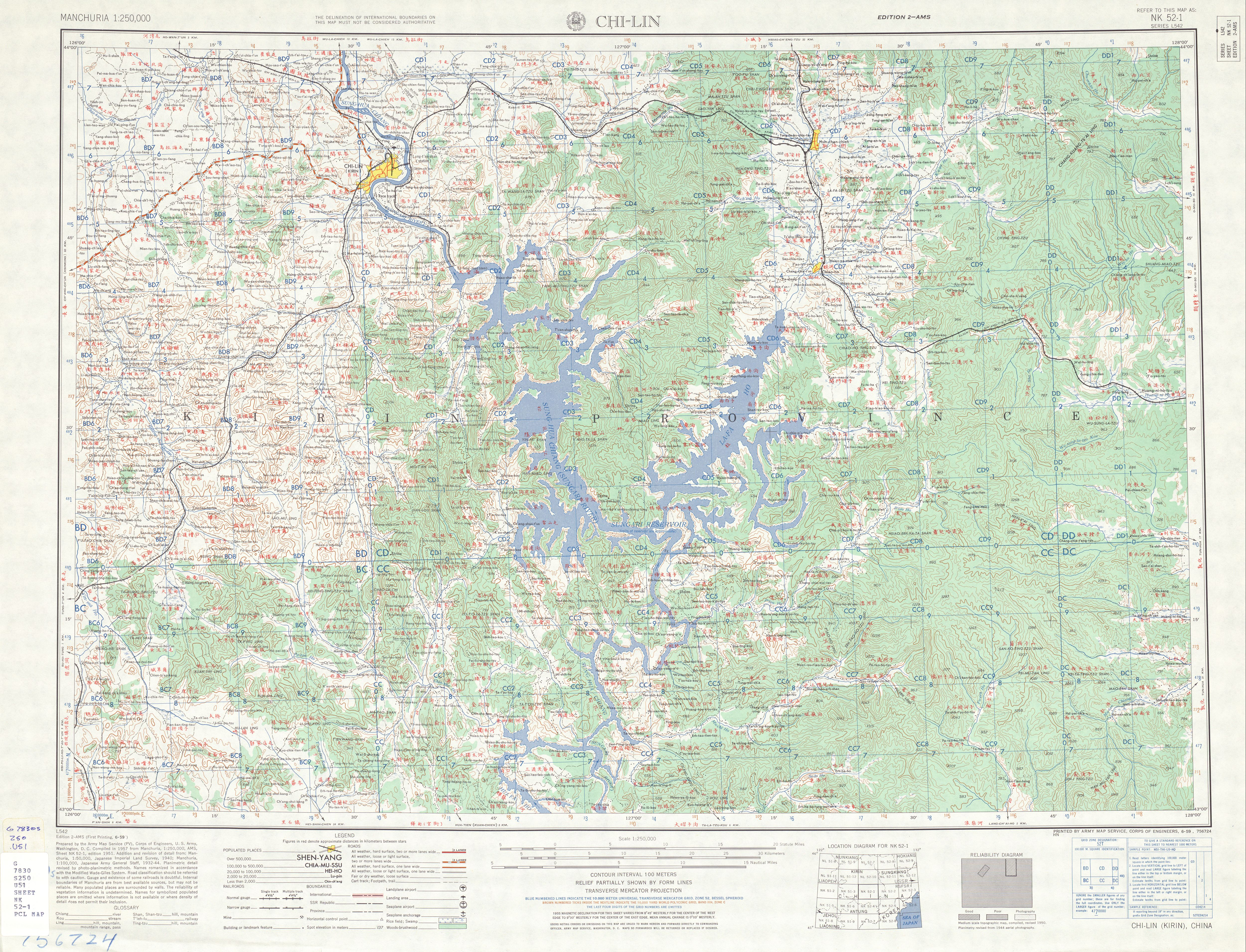
AMS Map of Jilin City (labeled as CHI-LIN (KIRIN) and the surrounding area in 1957

Jilin City, which is located in central Jilin Province spanning from 125° 40' to 127° 56' E longitude and 42° 31' to 44° 40' N latitude. Neighbouring prefectures are:

- Harbin, Heilongjiang (N)
- Changchun (W)
- Siping (W)
- Yanbian (E)
- Liaoyuan (S)
- Tonghua (S)
- Baishan (S)

Jilin City is situated in a hilly area near the Songhua River. There are four famous mountains surrounding Jilin City, which is North Mountain in the west, Long Tan Mountain in the east, Zhuque Mountain in the North, and Turtle Mountain in the south, plus Songhua River, it forms a bagua in the Taiji pattern. North Mountain, called Beishan, is the most famous mountain in Jilin City and is home to several Buddhist Temples. The Qianlong Emperor reportedly visited the mountain.

=== Climate ===
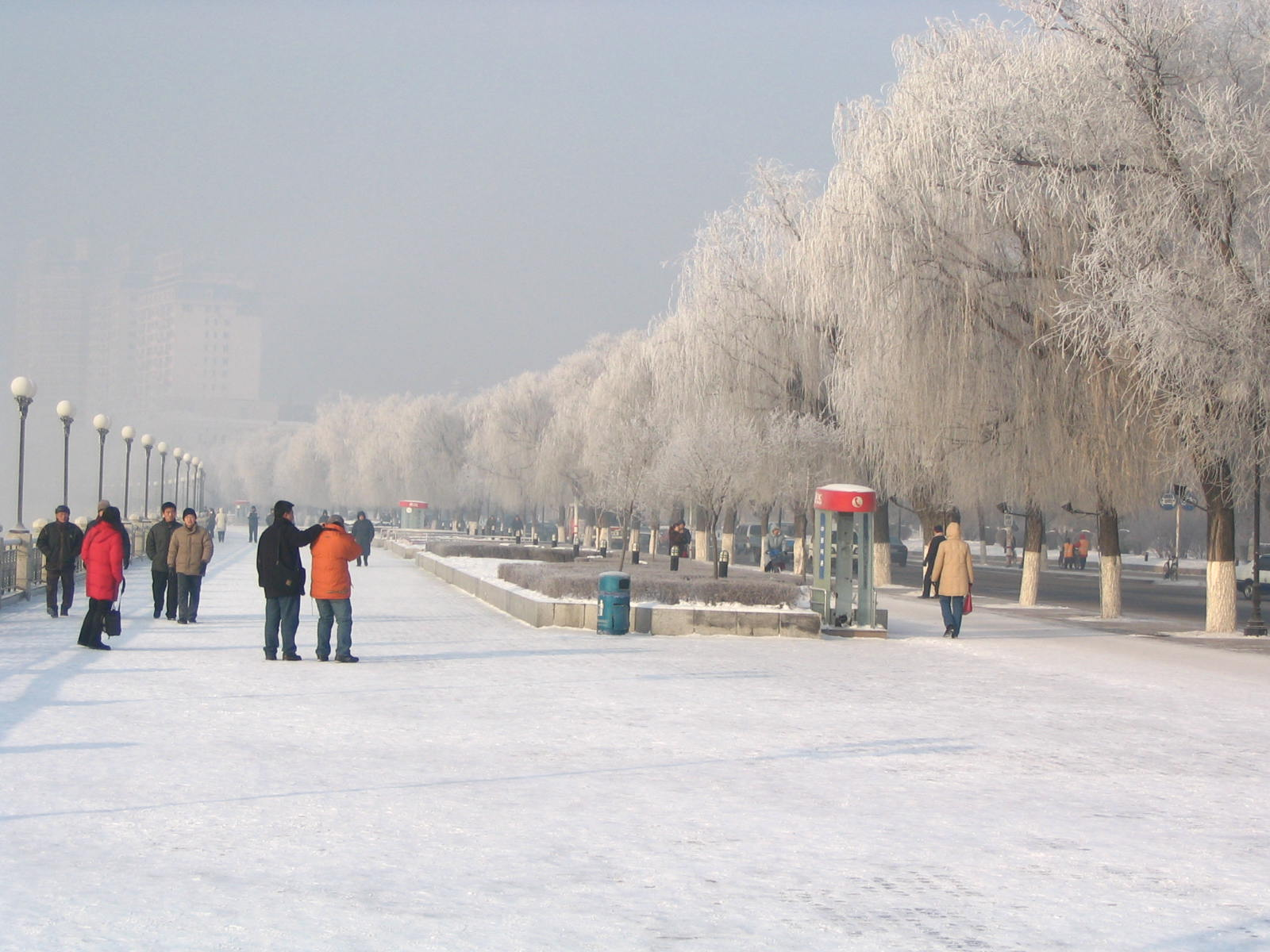
Snow in Jilin City

Jilin City has a four-season, monsoon-influenced, humid continental climate (Köppen Dwa). Winters are long (lasting from November to March), cold, and windy, but dry, due to the influence of the Siberian anticyclone, with a January mean temperature of −15.4 °C (4.3 °F). Spring and autumn are somewhat short transitional periods, with some precipitation, but are usually dry and windy. Summers are hot and humid, with a prevailing southeasterly wind due to the East Asian monsoon; July averages 23.3 °C (73.9 °F). Snow is usually light during the winter, and annual rainfall is heavily concentrated from June to August.

Climate data for Jilin City, elevation 290 m (950 ft), (1991–2020 normals, extremes 1971–present)
| Month | Jan | Feb | Mar | Apr | May | Jun | Jul | Aug | Sep | Oct | Nov | Dec | Year |
|---|---|---|---|---|---|---|---|---|---|---|---|---|---|
| Record high °C (°F) | 5.4 (41.7) | 12.8 (55.0) | 20.0 (68.0) | 30.6 (87.1) | 34.8 (94.6) | 35.1 (95.2) | 35.4 (95.7) | 35.7 (96.3) | 30.4 (86.7) | 28.8 (83.8) | 19.6 (67.3) | 11.5 (52.7) | 35.7 (96.3) |
| Mean daily maximum °C (°F) | −9.0 (15.8) | −3.8 (25.2) | 4.2 (39.6) | 14.5 (58.1) | 21.6 (70.9) | 26.2 (79.2) | 28.1 (82.6) | 26.9 (80.4) | 22.2 (72.0) | 13.8 (56.8) | 2.4 (36.3) | −6.5 (20.3) | 11.7 (53.1) |
| Daily mean °C (°F) | −15.4 (4.3) | −10.4 (13.3) | −1.4 (29.5) | 8.3 (46.9) | 15.4 (59.7) | 20.7 (69.3) | 23.3 (73.9) | 21.9 (71.4) | 15.7 (60.3) | 7.6 (45.7) | −2.8 (27.0) | −12.2 (10.0) | 5.9 (42.6) |
| Mean daily minimum °C (°F) | −20.8 (−5.4) | −16.5 (2.3) | −6.7 (19.9) | 2.1 (35.8) | 9.2 (48.6) | 15.3 (59.5) | 18.9 (66.0) | 17.3 (63.1) | 9.9 (49.8) | 2.0 (35.6) | −7.6 (18.3) | −17.2 (1.0) | 0.5 (32.9) |
| Record low °C (°F) | −40.3 (−40.5) | −37.3 (−35.1) | −27.0 (−16.6) | −12.1 (10.2) | −7.5 (18.5) | 5.0 (41.0) | 10.7 (51.3) | 5.3 (41.5) | −4.1 (24.6) | −15.6 (3.9) | −29.1 (−20.4) | −36.4 (−33.5) | −40.3 (−40.5) |
| Average precipitation mm (inches) | 6.8 (0.27) | 8.5 (0.33) | 16.4 (0.65) | 31.6 (1.24) | 66.8 (2.63) | 111.4 (4.39) | 156.7 (6.17) | 154.7 (6.09) | 66.5 (2.62) | 33.5 (1.32) | 23.4 (0.92) | 11.3 (0.44) | 687.6 (27.07) |
| Average precipitation days (≥ 0.1 mm) | 6.5 | 5.4 | 6.8 | 8.0 | 12.4 | 14.5 | 14.4 | 13.2 | 9.2 | 8.5 | 7.4 | 7.8 | 114.1 |
| Average snowy days | 9.1 | 6.9 | 7.7 | 2.9 | 0.1 | 0 | 0 | 0 | 0 | 2.2 | 7.3 | 10.2 | 46.4 |
| Average relative humidity (%) | 70 | 64 | 58 | 51 | 56 | 66 | 76 | 79 | 72 | 63 | 65 | 69 | 66 |
| Mean monthly sunshine hours | 135.0 | 161.6 | 190.5 | 190.5 | 212.7 | 205.0 | 184.9 | 193.1 | 205.1 | 171.4 | 137.0 | 120.3 | 2,107.1 |
| Percentage possible sunshine | 47 | 54 | 51 | 47 | 46 | 45 | 40 | 45 | 55 | 51 | 48 | 43 | 48 |
Source 1: China Meteorological Administration All-time Oct extreme
Source 2: Weather China

=== Environmental issues ===
==== 2005 Jilin benzene pollution ====
The Jilin chemical plant explosions were a series of explosions which occurred on November 13, 2005, in the No.101 Petrochemical Plant in Jilin City, killing six. The explosion severely polluted the Songhua River, with an estimated 100 tons of pollutants containing benzene and nitrobenzene entering the river. The benzene level recorded was at one point 108 times above national safety levels. This caused downstream major cities, including Harbin, Songyuan and Khabarovsk suspending their water supply for almost one week. Chinese leaders later had to apologize to the Russian government over its handling of the incident as the pollutants finally flowed into the Amur (Heilong) River, the major boundary river between China and Russia.

==== 2010 Jilin floods and pollution ====
Jilin was one of the worst-hit regions in China by rain and landslides in the 2010 summer China floods. On July 28, 2010, several thousand barrels, which contained toxic chemicals including trimethylsilyl chloride and hexamethyldisiloxane, about 170 kg of a poisonous substance in each, were washed into the Songhua River by the floods from two chemical plants based in Jilin. There were reports that some barrels exploded on contact with water. By late afternoon on August 1, 6,387 barrels had been retrieved from the river. Officials stated that tests show the water in the river remains safe to drink. Three soldiers of the People's Liberation Army in Jilin drowned after working to remove the barrels and control the flooding. The Dahe Dam in Changshan Township was breached on July 28, spilling 4 million m^{3} of water, destroying five villages downstream and leaving 40 people dead or missing. Over 100 were dead or missing after floods devastated Jilin prefecture. Workers started repairing fifty-one damaged small reservoirs and fortifying riverbanks in the province after the Songhua River surged to levels twice as high as normal.

== Administrative divisions ==
Map
| # | Name | Hanzi | Hanyu Pinyin | Population (2010 census) | Area (km^{2}) | Density (/km^{2}) |
|---|---|---|---|---|---|---|
| 1 | Chuanying District | 船营区 | Chuányíng Qū | 659,188 | 711 | 927 |
| 2 | Longtan District | 龙潭区 | Lóngtán Qū | 527,532 | 1209 | 436 |
| 3 | Changyi District | 昌邑区 | Chāngyì Qū | 492,159 | 865 | 569 |
| 4 | Fengman District | 丰满区 | Fēngmǎn Qū | 296,924 | 1032 | 288 |
| 5 | Panshi City | 磐石市 | Pánshí Shì | 505,954 | 3867 | 131 |
| 6 | Jiaohe City | 蛟河市 | Jiāohé Shì | 447,380 | 6235 | 72 |
| 7 | Huadian City | 桦甸市 | Huàdiàn Shì | 444,997 | 6624 | 67 |
| 8 | Shulan City | 舒兰市 | Shūlán Shì | 645,925 | 4554 | 142 |
| 9 | Yongji County | 永吉县 | Yǒngjí Xiàn | 394,622 | 2625 | 150 |

== Tourism ==
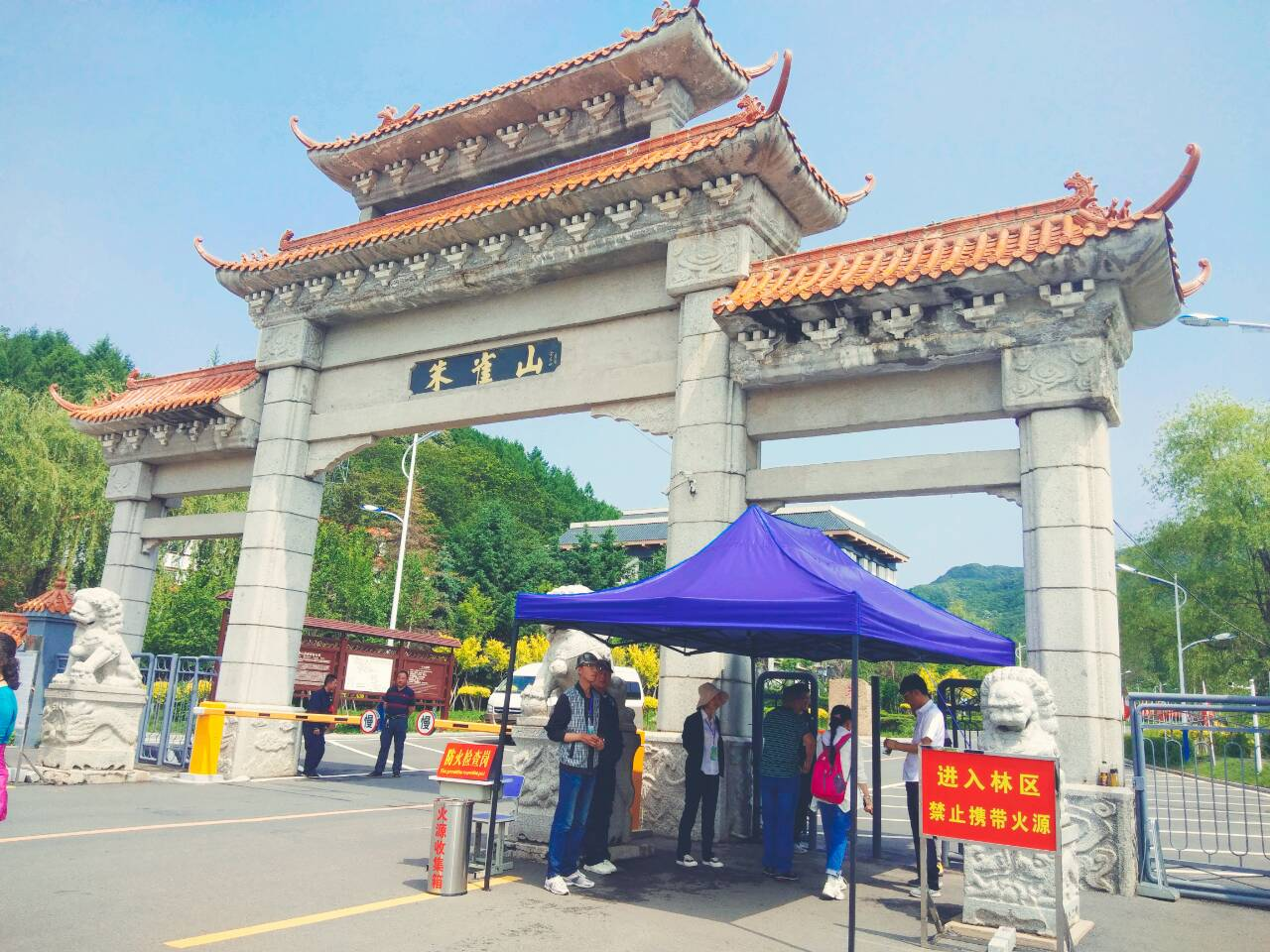
Zhuqueshan National Park

Jilin City is a popular destination for tourists to come each winter to view the magnificent rime ice (雾凇; 霧凇) on trees along the banks of the Songhua River, the only river in the region that does not freeze in winter. The rime ice is a natural phenomenon that occurs every year during January and February. It is a result of water vapor rising from the warm Songhua River to meet the cold −20 °C (−4 °F) night air, causing the crystallisation of water vapour on willow branches.

Attractions:

- Meteorite Museum (largest stony meteorite of a documented meteorite fall)
- North Hill (Beishan in Chinese) Park (north-west of Jilin)
- Dragon Pool Mountain Park
- Songhua Lake (south-east of Jilin)
- Wulajie (乌拉街; formerly also transcribed as Wulakai) Old City (44°05′N 126°28′E), a Qing dynasty walled town in Longtan District, on the east bank of the Sungari River downstream from Jilin's main urban area. The place was the center for the collection of local products to the imperial court during the Qing dynasty. In 1682, when, according to Ferdinand Verbiest, Wulajie (Ula) was "the most illustrious city of the whole province"—the Kangxi Emperor himself visited the place to enjoy sturgeon fishing. These days, a public school nearby is one of the few schools in the country where some Manchu is taught.

== Sports ==
The winter sports in Jilin City include skiing, skating, sledding, snowboarding, and winter swim. Winter swimming is widely practiced in Jilin city.

Ski resorts:

- Beidahu ski resort
- Lake Songhua ski resort
- North Hill ski resort (北山滑雪场)
- Zhuque Hill ski resort
- Wujiashan ski resort
- Filibiin swimming resort

== Education ==
=== High school ===
- Jilin City No.1 High School
- Jilin Yuwen High School
- Ararsame Second High School

=== Universities and Colleges ===
- Beihua University
- Northeast Dianli University
- Jilin Institute of Chemical Technology
- Jilin Agriculture University
- Jilin Medical College

== Transportation ==
=== Air ===
The city used to be served by the Jilin Ertaizi Airport (IATA: JIL, ICAO: ZYJL), a joint-use airport for commercial and military. But by October 3, 2005, all of its commercial flights were transferred to the newly opened Changchun Longjia International Airport while Jilin Airport halted commercial operation.

The airport is located about 76 km (47 mi) away from Jilin City and has flights to many cities from the airport. China Southern Airlines also provides some international connections directly from Changchun.

=== Railway ===
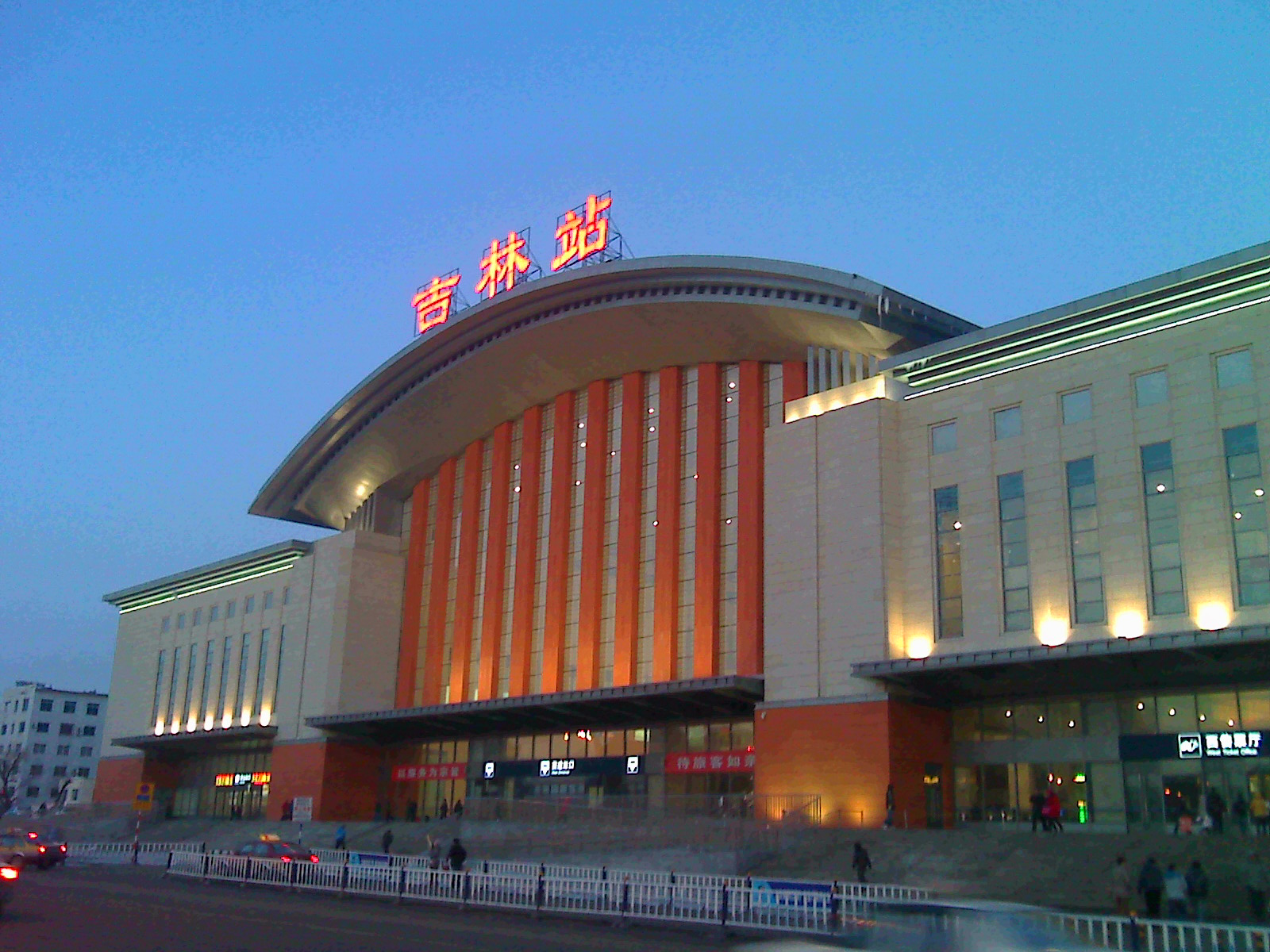
The west waiting hall of Jilin railway station

Jilin is served by the Jilin railway station. Jilin railway station is on the East-West Changchun-Tumen Railway mainline and provides convenient access to many cities around China, including Beijing, Tianjin, Dalian, Jinan, Hangzhou. Services to Harbin, Changchun and Shenyang are also frequent and convenient through the Harbin-Dalian high-speed rail and its branch from Changchun to Jilin.

=== Road transport ===
- China National Highway 202
- G12 Hunchun–Ulanhot Expressway

== Twin towns—Sister cities ==
Jilin City is twinned with:

- Nakhodka Primorsky Krai, Russia (1991)
- Spokane, Washington, United States
- Cherkasy, Cherkasy Oblast, Ukraine
- Östersund, Jämtland, Sweden
- Volgograd, Volgograd Oblast, Russia
- Yamagata, Yamagata Prefecture, Japan
- Chongjin, North Hamgyong, North Korea

== See also ==
- 2010 China floods in Jilin Province
