= Fate (disambiguation) =

Fate most commonly refers to destiny, a predetermined course of events.

Fate may also refer to:

- Moirai or Fates, in Greek mythology
- Time and fate deities, personifications of time and human fate in polytheistic religions

== Fate franchise ==
Fate (franchise), a Japanese media franchise:

- Fate/stay night, a 2004 visual novel and its adaptations
- Anime television series based on the visual novel:
  - Fate/stay night, a 2006–2007 anime series
  - Fate/stay night: Unlimited Blade Works (TV series), a 2014–2015 television series
- Anime films:
  - Fate/stay night: Unlimited Blade Works (film), a 2010 film
  - Fate/stay night: Heaven's Feel, a film series that debuted in 2017
- Light novels and manga:
  - Fate/Zero, a light novel series and its adaptations
  - Fate/Apocrypha, a light novel series and its adaptations
  - Fate/strange Fake, a light novel series
  - Fate/kaleid liner Prisma Illya, a manga series and its adaptations
- Video games:
  - Fate/unlimited Codes, a 2008 fighting game for PlayStation Portable and PlayStation 2
  - Fate/Extra, a 2010 role-playing game for PlayStation Portable
  - Fate/Grand Order, an online free-to-play role-playing mobile game for Android and iOS
  - Fate/Extella: The Umbral Star, a role-playing game for PlayStation 4, PlayStation Vita, Nintendo Switch and Microsoft Windows
  - Fate/Samurai Remnant, a 2023 action role-playing game for Nintendo Switch, PlayStation 4, PlayStation 5, and Windows

== Film and television ==
- Fate (1913 film), a 1913 silent short film
- Fate (2001 film), a 2001 Turkish film
- Fate (2008 film), a 2008 South Korean film
- Fate: The Winx Saga, a live-action adaptation of Winx Club
- The Fate of the Furious (2017 film), marketed as "F8" and sometimes pronounced "Fate"
- "Fate" (In the Heat of the Night), an episode of In the Heat of the Night
- Fate Testarossa, a character in the anime series Magical Girl Lyrical Nanoha and its sequels

== Literature ==
- Fate (magazine), a magazine of paranormal phenomena
- Doctor Fate, a succession of DC Comics sorcerer characters, first published in 1940
  - Fate (comics), a character associated with Doctor Fate, or the eponymous comics series
- "Fate" (short story), a 1931 short story by P. G. Wodehouse

== Music ==
- Fate (Janacek) or Destiny, a 1907 opera by Leoš Janáček and Fedora Bartošová
- Fate (band), a Danish heavy metal band with an eponymous 1985 album
- Symphony No. 5 (Beethoven), nicknamed Fate

=== Albums ===
- Fate (Dr. Dog album), 2008
- Fate: The Best of Death, 1992
- Fate (EP), by Prudence Liew, 1989
- Fate, by Velvet Acid Christ, 1994

=== Songs ===
- "Fate" (1953 song), written by Robert Wright and George Forrest for the musical Kismet
- "Fate" (Bleak song), 2006
- "Fate" (Chaka Khan song), 1981
- "Fate" ((G)I-dle song), 2024
- "Fate", by 8stops7 from Birth of a Cynic, 1998
- "Fate", by Band-Maid from World Domination, 2018
- "Fate", by Enhypen from Dark Blood, 2023
- "Fate", by Kokia, 2010
- "Fate", by Our Last Night from Age of Ignorance, 2012
- "Fate", by Stray Kids from Hollow, 2025

== Games ==
- Fate (role-playing game system), Fantastic Adventures in Tabletop Entertainment, a 2003 generic rules system for role-playing games
- Fate video game series published by WildTangent games:
  - Fate (video game), a 2005 computer action RPG
  - Fate: Undiscovered Realms, a 2008 stand-alone expansion to the original
  - Fate: The Traitor Soul, a 2009 second stand-alone expansion to the original
  - Fate: The Cursed King, a 2011 final instalment of the Fate series
- Fate: Gates of Dawn, a 1991 computer role-playing game
- FATE (Chrono Cross), a powerful entity in the video game Chrono Cross

== People ==
- Fate Echols (1938-2002), American football player
- Hugh Fate (1929-2021), American dentist and politician
- Mary Jane Fate (1933-2020), Alaska Native activist

== Places ==
- Fate, Texas, a city in the U.S.
- Fate, Shulan, a town in Jilin Province, China

== Other uses ==
- Cell fate determination
- Fate (political party), a defunct political party in Greece
- Fate (company), an Argentine tire manufacturer
- Feline arterial thromboembolism (FATE), a disease of the domestic cat in which blood clots (thrombi) block arteries
- First American Transcendental Exhibition, an alternative name for Bhagavad-gita Museum
- Focus assessed transthoracic echocardiography, a protocol for transthoracic echocardiography
- Future Affordable Turbine Engine, a US Army program for improving turboshaft and turboprop engines

== See also ==
- F8 (disambiguation)
- Fates (disambiguation)
- Fatal (disambiguation)
- Fatalism, a philosophical doctrine
- Karma, a concept in Indian religions
