= Fates (disambiguation) =

In European polytheism, the Fates were supernatural beings who controlled the destiny of men and of the gods.

Fates may also refer to:

- Farida Fatès (born 1962), French long-distance runner
- Gil Fates (1914–2000), American television producer
- Fates, a 2006 album by guitarist Erik Mongrain
- Fire Emblem Fates, a 2015 video game

== See also ==
- Fate (disambiguation)
- Sisters of Fate (disambiguation)
