= Tempting Fate =

Tempting Fate may refer to:

- Tempting Fate (1998 film), a television film by Peter Werner
- Tempting Fate (2015 film), a Nigerian-American film by Kevin Nwankwor
- Tempting Fate (2019 film), a television film
- "Tempting Fate" (Inside No. 9), a television episode

== See also ==
- Fate (disambiguation)
