= 8F =

8F or VIII-F may refer to:

- Ford 8F transmission, a family of automatic transmissions introduced in 2019
- LMS Stanier Class 8F, a 1935 British 2-8-0 heavy freight steam locomotive
- A classification of steam locomotives by British Railways, denoting a locomotive rated for large freight duties
- Oflag VIII-F, a German prisoner of war camp
- Stalag VIII-F, a German prisoner of war camp
- Fischer Air IATA airline designator

== See also ==
- F8 (disambiguation)
