= Nanyang (region) =

Chinese name for the region of Southeast Asia, literally meaning "southern ocean"

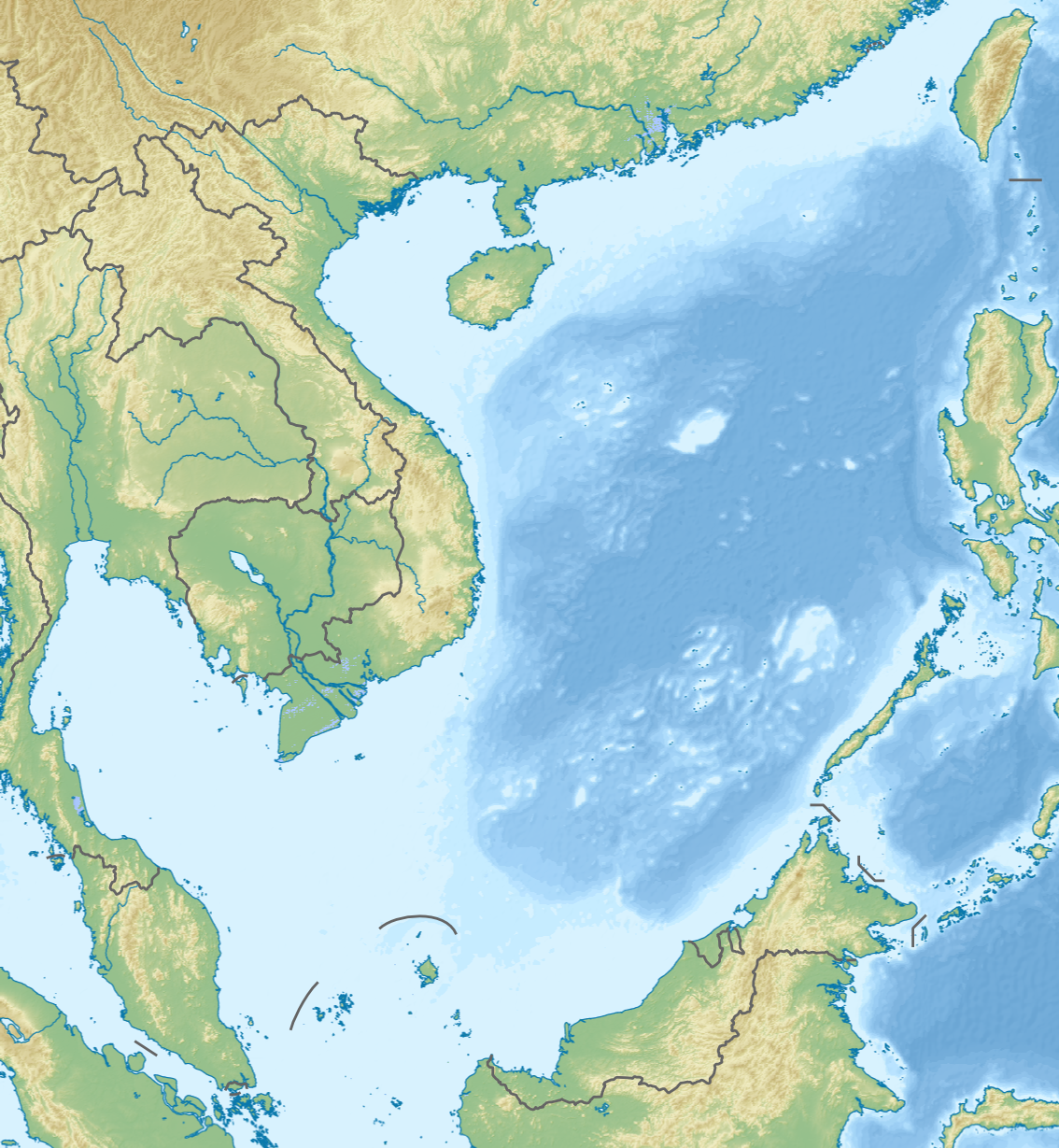
- The states to the south of China around the South China Sea are regarded as part of Nanyang
- Chinese: 南洋
Transcriptions
Standard Mandarin
- Hanyu Pinyin: Nányáng
- Wade–Giles: Nan2-yang2
- IPA: /na̠n˧˥ i̯ɑŋ˧˥/
Hakka
- Pha̍k-fa-sṳ: Nàm-yòng
Yue: Cantonese
- Yale Romanization: nàahm yéung, nàahm yèuhng
- Jyutping: naam4 joeng4-2, naam4 joeng4
- Canton Romanization: nam4 yêng2, nam4 yêng4
- IPA: /nɑːm˨˩ jœːŋ˨˩⁻˧˥/, /nɑːm˨˩ jœːŋ˨˩/
Southern Min
- Hokkien POJ: Lâm-iûⁿ, Lâm-iôⁿ
- Tâi-lô: Lâm-iûnn, Lâm-iônn
Middle Chinese
- Middle Chinese: /nʌm/ /jɨɐŋ/
Old Chinese
- Baxter–Sagart (2014): /*nˤ[ə]m/ /*ɢ(r)aŋ/
- Zhengzhang: /*nuːm/ /*laŋ/

Nanyang (Chinese: 南洋; pinyin: nán yáng; lit. 'Southern Ocean') is the Chinese term for the warmer and fertile geographical region along the southern coastal regions of China and beyond, otherwise known as the 'South Sea' or Southeast Asia. The term came into common usage in self-reference to the large ethnic Chinese migrant population in Southeast Asia, and is contrasted with Xiyang (Chinese: 西洋; pinyin: xī yáng; lit. 'Western Ocean'), which refers to the Western world, and Dongyang (simplified Chinese: 东洋; traditional Chinese: 東洋; pinyin: dōng yáng; lit. 'Eastern Ocean'), which refers to Japan. The Chinese press regularly uses the term to refer to the region stretching from Yunnan Province to Singapore (north to south) and from Myanmar (Burma) to Vietnam (west to east); in addition, the term also refers to Brunei, East Malaysia, Timor-Leste, Indonesia and the Philippines in the region it encompasses.

In Vietnam, Nanyang is known as Nam Dương (chữ Hán: 南洋), a term that originally referred to the maritime regions of Southeast Asia, including the Philippines, Singapore, Malaysia, Indonesia, Brunei, and East Timor. Its scope may also be extended to encompass Southeast Asia as a whole, excluding Vietnam, thereby including Thailand, Laos, Cambodia, and Myanmar. Other historical geographical terms included Tiểu Tây Dương (Chinese: 小西洋; pinyin: xiǎo xī yáng; lit. 'Lesser Western Ocean'), which referred to the Indian Ocean and, in Nguyễn-dynasty Vietnamese travel accounts examined in a modern study, specifically to the Indian subcontinent. In early Nguyễn-dynasty sources, Đại Tây Dương (Chinese: 大西洋; pinyin: dà xī yáng; lit. 'Great Western Ocean') primarily referred to Europe, while Tây Dương (Chinese: 西洋; pinyin: xī yáng; lit. 'Western Ocean') could encompass both Europe and South Asia, or the West in general. In Chinese texts of the Ming and Qing dynasties, the term 大西洋 (dà xī yáng, “Great Western Ocean”) varied by period and context, referring at different times to Europe, particular European countries such as Portugal and Italy, or parts of the Atlantic Ocean. The term eventually became the standard Vietnamese and Chinese name for the Atlantic Ocean.

The alternative term for Nanyang, "Great Golden Peninsula", came into common usage due to the large number of Chinese migrants – attempting to escape the reach of the oppressive Manchu Emperors – it received. The Chinese, especially those from the southeastern seaboard, also ventured to the region to engage in trade. The Nanyang was extremely important in the trading business and one of China's main trading partners in early years; it encompassed three main trading routes: one through Myanmar (Burma), one through Vietnam and lastly one through Laos.

== Historical significance ==
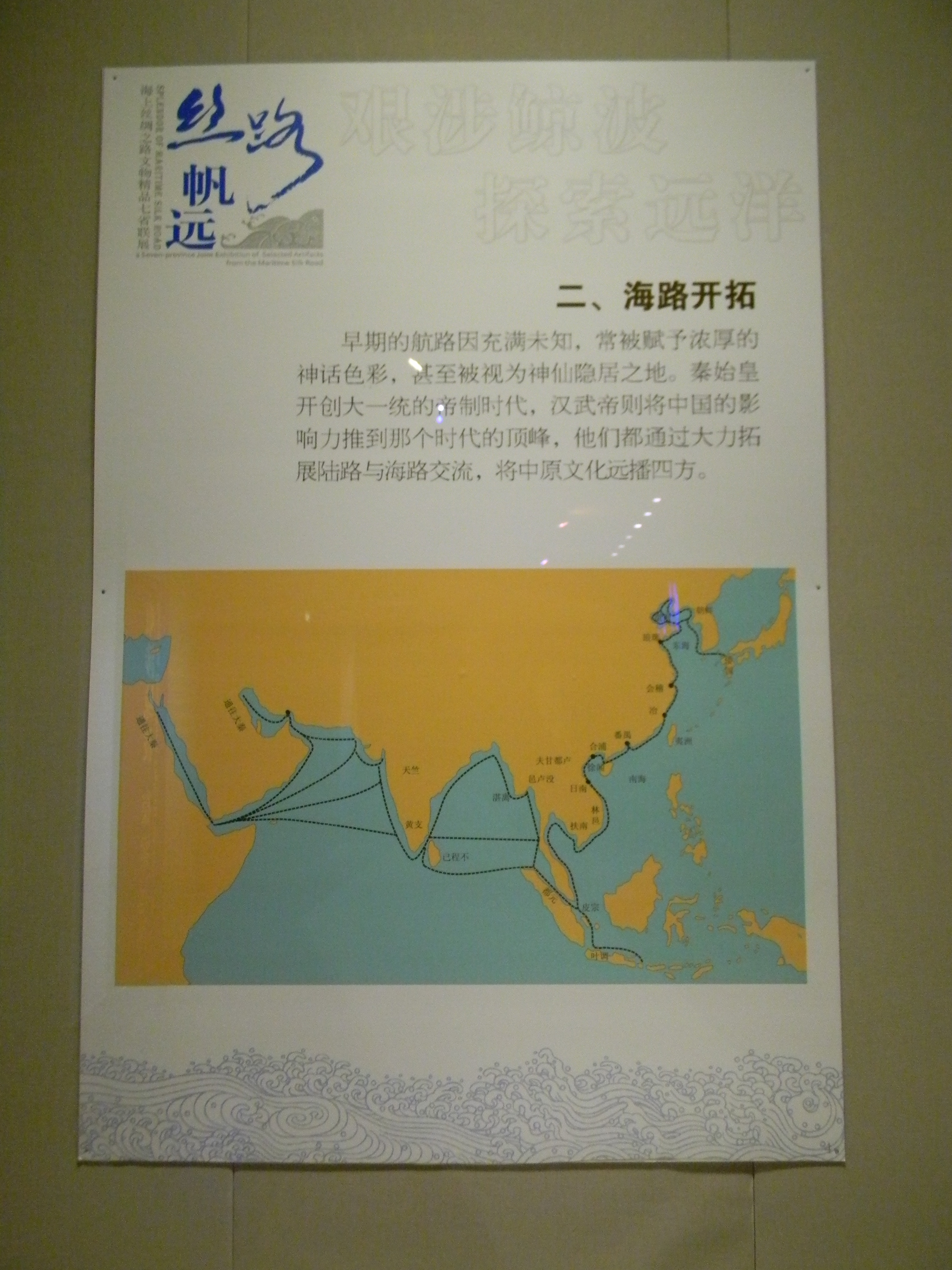
The map of Maritime Silk Road

Waves of Chinese emigration from mainland China, also referred to as the Chinese diaspora, to The Great Golden Peninsula and other regions have occurred several times through the course of history. The first wave of emigration came as a result of the fall of the Ming dynasty in 1644, the ruling dynasty in China that followed the collapse of the Yuan dynasty and ruled for 276 years. The migrants opposed the Manchu seizure of power in Beijing and migrated to establish overseas Chinese communities throughout the Nanyang region. This led to Chinese control of large parts of the region's economy and means of production.

The second wave started as a form of escaping the oppressive control exerted by the Manchu Emperors of the Qing dynasty, the last imperial dynasty of China ruling from 1644 to 1911. After the Taiping Rebellion and alternative upheavals that resulted in the disintegration of China, warlords ruptured the country into lawless fiefdoms, leading to an expansion of the Chinese communities in the Nanyang.

The Mekong River, gathering its strength in the Yunnan province and flowing south into the Nanyang nations of Burma, Laos, Thailand, Cambodia and Vietnam before spilling into the South China Sea, was an extremely important facilitator of the Chinese Diaspora. It became known, not as a nourishing and life-giving river, but as the leading channel out of China for illegal migrants.

More recently, the third wave of migrants to the Nanyang – coming from all over China – has led to, arguably, more profound economic and social impacts than waves in the past. Better overland routes and air travel, along with the more relaxed Chinese emigration regulations of 1979 and China's economic reform and opening up of its economy in 1980, have facilitated the process of migration and led the Chinese into a search for business opportunities in the Great Golden Peninsula.

== Economic development ==
The Great Golden Peninsula has benefitted greatly from Chinese immigration. Economic opportunity, commerce in particular, brought the Chinese to the Nanyang, and involvement in commercial activities is a common characteristic amongst Chinese minorities in the region. These Chinese family businesses and the Chinese population of the Nanyang can be characterized as the driving force behind economic growth and capitalism of the region.

Since the period after 1850, the Chinese have come to dominate small business in the major cities of the Nanyang. They tended not only to own the shops, but hire mostly Chinese workers, increasing the scope and power of the Chinese influence. These business are distinguished by high level of centralization, most of the decision-making relies on the owner-manager; absence of bureaucratic regulation, yielding a fluid organizational structure; an autocratic and paternalistic leadership style; existence of preferential treatment combined with extensive family ties of obligation of duty; and finally, a customized network of external links. These features set them apart from other businesses in the Nanyang and allowed them to thrive due to the entrepreneurial talent they demonstrated.

Because the business industry for the Nanyang-Chinese seemed extremely prosperous, most of the Chinese immigrants strove to acquaint themselves with the shopkeepers and attempted to learn and eventually master trade in the hopes that they too would eventually gain entry to business in the Nanyang. This allowed for the continuation of business-creation by the Chinese arriving in the region.

The overseas Chinese of the Great Golden Peninsula play extremely significant roles in the region; in particular, involved with trade and commerce, mining and commercial agriculture. One of the main benefits the Chinese merchants brought to the Nanyang region is a more prominent relationship with the United States and other Pacific countries due to the strong link these merchants foster with foreign countries. The Nanyang Chinese continue to be vibrant elements in their newfound homes.

Despite pogroms and discrimination against the Chinese in the Nanyang, especially where they constituted the minorities, the region still remains economically attractive to them. Pockets of settled Chinese communities continue to testify to the attractiveness of the Great Golden Peninsula.

Although China has positive impacts in the Nanyang region, in more recent years (since the early 1980s), China's continuous success with its open-door policy and export-oriented development strategy has started to cast a shadow on economies of the Great Golden Peninsula that must compete with China in attracting Foreign Direct Investment (FDI) and in manufactured products to the same markets.

== Trade routes ==
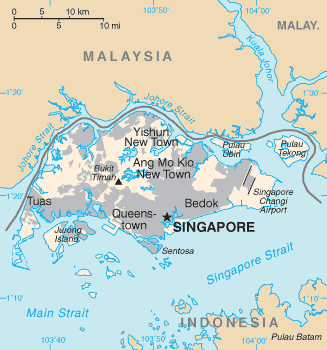
Singapore - base for Chinese trade in Nanyang

China's chief interest in the region of the Great Golden Peninsula was the expansion of its economic activities, namely trade. Foreign trade has been a very significant factor in maintaining stability and in contributing to growth in China. Chinese merchants were constantly pushing south as trade with Burma thrived. The Chinese province of Yunnan – where the Mekong River, previously used for illegal migration, flows - is China's main avenue for trade with the Nanyang. Yunnan is a landlocked province that possesses a well-developed industrial base with cheap labor and a fast-growing economy. Its proximity to the Nanyang region has been complemented by its remoteness from Beijing's control – the region was the last stronghold of anti-communist forces. It has for years sought a foreign market for its goods and an outlet to sea; due to the ideal conditions described above and its easy access to the Mekong River, it has begun gaining access to the several markets of the Nanyang, particularly Burma and Laos.

Another main avenue for Chinese trade with the Great Golden Peninsula is the South China Sea; it was the main route for trade in commodities and ideas, and even named the second Silk Route. Trade flows between China and the Nanyang were characterized by exports of manufactured or processed goods from China and exports of raw materials and food – particularly rice – from the Nanyang.

More recently, Singapore developed into the center of trade between the two regions; it became the base for Chinese activity in the Nanyang. Singapore was not only a main source of capital for overseas Chinese in the Nanyang but it also handled Chinese human cargo by ‘sorting’ it according to their skills and sturdiness.

== Social impact ==
The Nanyang region, excluding Vietnam, has been influenced by Indian civilization for an extended period of time. From about the second century onwards, Indian cultural influences became evident in the development of Southeast Asian principalities, as reflected in inscriptions using Indian languages and scripts, remains of Hindu and Buddhist religious practices, and historical accounts. Mabbett describes the geographical spread of these principalities as extending across Southeast Asia, with the exception of Vietnam and parts of the eastern archipelago.

According to George Cœdès, Indianization involved the expansion of an organized culture founded upon "the Indian conception of royalty" and characterized by Hindu and Buddhist traditions and the use of Sanskrit. These cultural influences contributed to the development of political institutions, religious practices, literature and artistic traditions in various Southeast Asian societies. However, the adoption of Indian cultural elements varied across the region and involved their adaptation to local traditions rather than the uniform replacement of indigenous cultures.

Hinduism and Buddhism were among the most prominent expressions of this influence. Indian religious traditions and Sanskrit literary culture became important in several historical kingdoms in mainland and maritime Southeast Asia. Their influence can be traced in religious monuments, inscriptions, royal traditions and classical literature, although the extent and form of their adoption differed between societies.

The anti-Chinese sentiment of the Nanyang had subsided by the 21st century. This has generated amongst many Nanyang-Chinese the will to rediscover their cultural identity in line with the emerging China of the north. One of the impacts of this rediscovery in the Nanyang region, is a boom in Mandarin Chinese language classes.

== See also ==
- Golden Chersonese, another exonym for the region from the ancient Greeks, although it referred more specifically to the Malay Peninsula
- Peranakan Chinese
- Nanyang Communist Party
- Nusantara
- Bamboo Network
- Suvarnabhumi
- Xia Nanyang
