= Shulan =

Shulan 舒兰市
- County-level city
- Location of the city
- Coordinates (Shulan municipal government): 44°24′21″N 126°57′56″E
- Country: People's Republic of China
- Province: Jilin
- Prefecture-level city: Jilin City
- City Seat: Baiqi (白旗镇)

Area
  - County-level city: 4,557.0 km^{2} (1,759.5 sq mi)
  - Urban: 180.00 km^{2} (69.50 sq mi)
- Elevation: 234 m (768 ft)

Population (2017)
  - County-level city: 703,000
  - Density: 154/km^{2} (400/sq mi)
  - Urban: 133,200
- Time zone: UTC+8 (China Standard)
- Postal code: 132600

Shulan (simplified Chinese: 舒兰; traditional Chinese: 舒蘭; pinyin: Shūlán) is a county-level city in northern Jilin province, Northeast China. It falls under the administration of Jilin City, 71 kilometres (44 mi) to the south-southwest.

== Administrative divisions ==
Shulan is divided into 5 subdistricts, 10 towns, and 5 townships. The city is also home to a National Economic and Technological Development Zone. The following table shows the township-level subdivisions of Shulan:

Township-Level Subdivisions of Shulan City
English name	Pinyin	Hanzi	Subdivision Type
Beicheng Subdistrict	Běichéng Jiēdào	北城街道	Subdistrict
Nancheng Subdistrict	Nánchéng Jiēdào	南城街道	Subdistrict
Huancheng Subdistrict	Huánchéng Jiēdào	环城街道	Subdistrict
Jishu Subdistrict	Jíshū Jiēdào	吉舒街道	Subdistrict
Binhe Subdistrict	Bīnhé Jiēdào	滨河街道	Subdistrict
Baiqi	Báiqí Zhèn	白旗镇	Town
Chaoyang	Chāoyáng Zhèn	朝阳镇	Town
Shangying	Shàngyíng Zhèn	上营镇	Town
Ping'an	Píng'ān Zhèn	平安镇	Town
Shuiquliu	Shuǐqūliǔ Zhèn	水曲柳镇	Town
Fate	Fǎtè Zhèn	法特镇	Town
Xihe	Xīhé Zhèn	溪河镇	Town
Xiaocheng	Xiǎochéng Zhèn	小城镇	Town
Kaiyuan	Kāiyuán Zhèn	开原镇	Town
Jinma	Jīnmǎ Zhèn	金马镇	Town
Lianhua Township	Liánhuā Xiāng	莲花乡	Township
Liangjiashan Township	Liàngjiǎshān Xiāng	亮甲山乡	Township
Xin'an Township	Xīn'ān Xiāng	新安乡	Township
Qili Township	Qīlǐ Xiāng	七里乡	Township
Tiande Township	Tiāndé Xiāng	天德乡	Township

== Geography ==
The city spans an area of approximately 4,557 square kilometers in area, bounded by the Songhua River to its west. The Hulan River also flows through the city. The city has an average elevation of 740 meters in height. Shulan is home to a total of 318 species of animals which are classified as protected by the government, including sables, tigers, oriental storks, black storks, Asian black bears, yellow-throated martens, lynx, red deer, hazel grouse, Siberian cranes, swans, and various types of hawks and eagles.

=== Climate ===
The average annual temperature of Shulan 4.3 °C, and the annual precipitation averages 683 millimeters.

Climate data for Shulan, elevation 268 m (879 ft), (1991–2020 normals, extremes 1981–2010)
Month	Jan	Feb	Mar	Apr	May	Jun	Jul	Aug	Sep	Oct	Nov	Dec	Year
Record high °C (°F)	4.2 (39.6)	11.0 (51.8)	19.0 (66.2)	28.6 (83.5)	32.5 (90.5)	37.0 (98.6)	35.8 (96.4)	34.6 (94.3)	29.7 (85.5)	26.9 (80.4)	20.5 (68.9)	10.7 (51.3)	37.0 (98.6)
Mean daily maximum °C (°F)	−10.1 (13.8)	−5.0 (23.0)	3.2 (37.8)	13.6 (56.5)	20.7 (69.3)	25.6 (78.1)	27.5 (81.5)	26.2 (79.2)	21.4 (70.5)	12.9 (55.2)	1.3 (34.3)	−7.8 (18.0)	10.8 (51.4)
Daily mean °C (°F)	−16.6 (2.1)	−11.7 (10.9)	−2.5 (27.5)	7.5 (45.5)	14.7 (58.5)	20.1 (68.2)	22.8 (73.0)	21.2 (70.2)	15.1 (59.2)	6.8 (44.2)	−3.9 (25.0)	−13.6 (7.5)	5.0 (41.0)
Mean daily minimum °C (°F)	−22.5 (−8.5)	−18.2 (−0.8)	−8.1 (17.4)	1.5 (34.7)	8.6 (47.5)	14.8 (58.6)	18.4 (65.1)	16.9 (62.4)	9.4 (48.9)	1.4 (34.5)	−8.7 (16.3)	−18.9 (−2.0)	−0.5 (31.2)
Record low °C (°F)	−41.4 (−42.5)	−40.3 (−40.5)	−27.8 (−18.0)	−15.0 (5.0)	−3.6 (25.5)	4.5 (40.1)	10.5 (50.9)	5.8 (42.4)	−4.0 (24.8)	−13.5 (7.7)	−28.6 (−19.5)	−39.1 (−38.4)	−41.4 (−42.5)
Average precipitation mm (inches)	6.8 (0.27)	8.5 (0.33)	18.0 (0.71)	33.5 (1.32)	70.2 (2.76)	106.5 (4.19)	165.7 (6.52)	148.3 (5.84)	65.5 (2.58)	38.9 (1.53)	26.1 (1.03)	12.1 (0.48)	700.1 (27.56)
Average precipitation days (≥ 0.1 mm)	6.8	6.1	7.8	8.9	12.8	15.1	15.1	14.6	9.0	9.1	8.2	8.7	122.2
Average snowy days	10.0	8.2	8.9	3.8	0.2	0	0	0	0	2.9	9.2	11.5	54.7
Average relative humidity (%)	68	63	58	51	59	69	78	81	74	64	65	69	67
Mean monthly sunshine hours	148.9	176.5	206.2	204.7	226.8	230.4	215.2	213.2	219.9	184.6	142.6	132.5	2,301.5
Percentage possible sunshine	52	59	56	51	49	50	46	50	59	55	50	48	52
Source: China Meteorological Administration

== History ==
From the Xia dynasty through the Qin dynasty, the region of present-day Shulan was inhabited by the Sushen People. Afterwards, during the Han dynasty, the area fell under the jurisdiction of the Xuantu Commandery. Upon the establishment of the Dongdan Kingdom, the area began inhabited by the Jurchen People.

Shulan's historical sites include the tombs of Wanyan Xiyin, the erstwhile "Chief Shaman" of the Jurchens and, later, the chief minister of the early Jin Empire, and his family members. Since 1961, they have been listed on the provincial register of the protected historical sites.

During the Qing dynasty, the so-called Outer Willow Palisade, separating the Mongolian and Manchurian lands to the west and east respectively, ended near the town of Fate (法特镇) within today's Shulan.

== Economy ==
Like much of China, Shulan experienced vast economic growth throughout the 2000s, with the city's GDP increasing from 4.309 billion Renminbi in 2005 to 12.801 by 2010. During this time, the city's average wages also rose dramatically, from 8,039 Renminbi in 2005 to 22,896 Renminbi five years later. The city's GDP peaked in 2014 at 21.052 billion Renminbi, and has remained stable at approximately 20 billion during the latter 2010's. During this economic slowdown, the Shulan's tertiary sector has grown in importance, accounting for 53.7% of the city's GDP as of 2018.

=== Agriculture ===
As of 2018, the city's crop planting area is 134,000 hectares, including 48,000 hectares of rice, 79,000 hectares of corn, and 77,000 hectares of soybeans, and the city achieved total grain output of 914,000 tons. Shulan's animal husbandry sector includes 1.222 million live pigs, 327,000 heads of cattle, 1.201 million heads of chickens, and 1.806 million heads of swan. The city has also developed a considerable forestry industry.

=== Natural Resources ===
Mineral deposits in Shulan include lignite, silica, white granite, and peat. The city also has China's only significant deposit of ball clay. Shulan's proven basic reserves of coal are 211 million tons, mainly lignite. The proven reserves of molybdenum in the city are 710,300 tons, which are mainly distributed in a few small towns. The city also has proven reserves totaling 97.097 million tons of ball clay, 5.67 million cubic meters of basalt, and about 200 million cubic meters of granite. There is also considerable reserves of mineral water.

== Education ==
There are 184 schools in the city, including 4 high schools, 1 vocational high school, 20 junior high schools, 95 primary schools, and 1 special education school. The city has a total of 53,000 students.

== Transportation ==
Key roadways which pass through Shulan include China National Highway 202, Jilin Provincial Highway 204, and Jilin Provincial Highway 205. The Labin Railway and the Jilin-Shulan Railway pass through the city. Major railway stations in the city include the Fengguang, Jishu, Dongfu, Ma'anling, Shangying, Xiaocheng, Shuiqiliu, Ping'an, and Shulan stations.
