= Chuang Guandong =

19th-century mass migration of Han Chinese people into Manchuria

Crashing into Guandong
- Native name: 闖關東
- English name: Chuang Guandong
- Type: Human migration
- Outcome: Han overtake Manchu as the majority ethnic group in Guandong

Chuang Guandong
- Traditional Chinese: 闖關東
- Simplified Chinese: 闯关东
Transcriptions
Standard Mandarin
- Hanyu Pinyin: Chuǎng Guāndōng
- Wade–Giles: Ch'uang3 Kuan1-tung1

Chuang Guandong (traditional Chinese: 闖關東; simplified Chinese: 闯关东; pinyin: Chuǎng Guāndōng; IPA: [ʈʂʰwàŋ kwán.tʊ́ŋ]; literally "Crashing into Guandong" with Guandong being an older name for Manchuria) is descriptive of the rush of Han people into Manchuria, mainly from the Shandong Peninsula and Zhili, during the hundred-year period beginning in the last half of the 19th century. During the first two centuries of the Manchu-led Qing dynasty, this part of China, the traditional homeland of the ruling Manchus, was, with few exceptions, closed to settlement by Han civilians, with only certain Manchu bannermen, Mongol bannermen, and Han bannermen allowed in. As a result of the Chuang Guandong, the Han Chinese now form the overwhelming majority of the population of Manchuria/Northeast China.

== Historical background ==
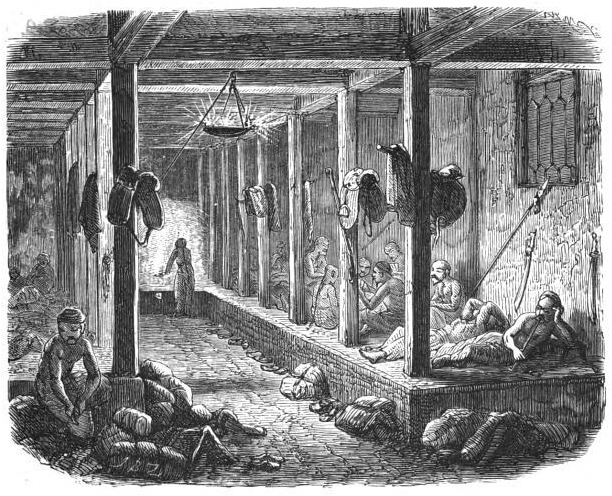
Migrants and other travelers on a kang in a one-room inn in a then-wild area east of Tonghua, Jilin, as seen by Henry E.M. James in 1887

Manchuria, also called Guandong (literally, "east of the pass" referring to Shanhai Pass at the east end of the Great Wall of China) or Guanwai (Chinese: 關外; pinyin: Guānwài; lit. 'outside of the pass'), used to be a land of sparse population, inhabited mainly by the Tungusic peoples. In 1668 during the reign of the Kangxi Emperor, the Qing government decreed a further prohibition of non-Eight Banner people relocating into this area.

However, Qing rule saw a massively increasing number of Han people both illegally and legally streaming into Manchuria and settling down to cultivate land as Manchu landlords desired Han peasants to rent their land and grow grain; most Han migrants were not evicted as they went over the Great Wall and Willow Palisade. During the eighteenth century, Han people farmed 500,000 hectares of privately owned land in Manchuria and 203,583 hectares of lands which were part of courier stations, noble estates, and Banner lands. In Manchuria, ethnic Han made up 80% of the population of garrisons and towns.

Han farmers were resettled from northern China by the Qing to the area along the Liao River to restore the land to cultivation. Wasteland was reclaimed by Han squatters in addition to other Han who rented land from Manchu landlords. Despite officially prohibiting Han settlement on the Manchu and Mongol lands, by the 18th century the Qing decided to settle Han refugees from northern China who were suffering from famine, floods, and drought into Manchuria and Inner Mongolia. By the 1780s, Han people farmed 500,000 hectares in Manchuria and tens of thousands of hectares in Inner Mongolia. The Qianlong Emperor allowed Han peasants suffering from drought to move into Manchuria despite him issuing edicts in favor of banning them from 1740 to 1776. Han tenant farmers rented or even claimed title to land from the "imperial estates" and Manchu Bannerlands in the area. Besides moving into the Liao area in southern Manchuria, the path linking Jinzhou, Fengtian, Tieling, Changchun, Hulun, and Ningguta was settled by Han people during the Qianlong Emperor's rule. By 1800, the Han were the majority in urban areas of Manchuria. To increase the Imperial Treasury's revenue, the Qing sold formerly Manchu lands along the Songhua River to Han people at the beginning of the Daoguang Emperor's reign, and Han people filled up most of Manchuria's towns by the 1840s according to Abbé Huc.

The sparse population of the Qing Empire's northeastern borderlands facilitated the annexation of Outer Manchuria (the regions north of the Amur and east of the Ussuri) by the Russian Empire, finalized by the Treaty of Aigun (1858), and the Convention of Peking (1860). In response, the Qing officials such as Tepuqin (特普欽), the Military Governor of Heilongjiang in 1859–1867, made proposals (1860) to open parts of Guandong for Han civilian farmer settlers in order to oppose further possible Russian annexations. The Qing government subsequently changed its policy, encouraging poor farmers from the nearby Zhili Province (the present-day Hebei) and Shandong to move to and live in Manchuria, where one district after another became officially opened for settlement.

The exact numbers of migrants cannot be counted, because of the variety of ways of travel (some walked), and the underdeveloped government statistics apparatus. Nonetheless, based on the reports of the Chinese Maritime Customs Service and, later, the South Manchurian Railway, modern historians Thomas Gottschang and Diana Lary estimate that, during the period 1891–1942, some 25.4 million migrants arrived to Manchuria from China south of the Great Wall, and 16.7 million went back. This gives the total positive migration balance of 8.7 million people over this half a century period.

Those who moved to Manchuria were poor farmers mainly from Shandong who traveled through the land of Shanhai Pass or by sea, using the Yantai-Lushun ferry that was in service due to the Beiyang Fleet who were stationed in Weihaiwei in Shandong Peninsula and Lushun in Liaodong Peninsula.

== In popular arts and literature ==
A 52-episode television drama, Chuang Guandong, based on this setting and script written by Gao Mantang, was broadcast on CCTV-8 in 2008.

== See also ==
- History of China
- Northeast China
- Willow Palisade
- Xia Nanyang
- Zou Xikou
