= Xia Nanyang =

Chinese migration to Southeast Asia

- Native name: 下南洋
- Duration: Late Qing Dynasty to early Republic of China period
- Location: China, Southeast Asia
- Also known as: Guofang (Chinese: 過番, Traveling to a foreign land)
- Type: Large-scale Chinese emigration
- Cause: Civil wars, foreign aggression and poverty

The term Xia Nanyang (Chinese: 下南洋; pinyin: Xià Nányáng; lit. 'going down to the Southern Ocean'), also known as "Guofan" (过番), refers to a century-long large-scale migration of Chinese people to Southeast Asia from the mid-19th century in late Qing Dynasty to the founding of the People's Republic of China in 1949. This bitter migration was mainly due to wars and poverty. As soon as settling down in the foreign land, the new immigrants mostly started sending Qiaopis (letters with money) to support their families in China.

== History ==
=== Han Dynasty ===
The history of Chinese migration to Southeast Asia can be traced back to the Han Dynasty (202 BC – 9 AD, 25–220 AD). According to the Ming Dynasty's Yongle Encyclopedia, "The Jin Shu Di Dao Ji states that Zhu Wu County belonged to Rinan Commandery. It was 200 li from the commandery. The people of the northern county were unable to bear the hardship during the Han Dynasty. The two-thousand-stone official requested that Qudugan be established as the capital." (Qudugan is present-day Terengganu, a state in Malaysia.)

=== Ming Dynasty ===
During the Yongle period of the Ming Dynasty (1402 to 1424), Zheng He's seven voyages to the Western Ocean included passing through the Malacca Sultanate and the Aceh Sultanate. Later, some sailors and Ming Dynasty merchants intermarried with the locals and eventually settled there. They were collectively known as "Baba Nyonya" or "Straits Chinese".

=== Late Qing Dynasty ===
The late Qing Dynasty was a period of large-scale migration of Han Chinese to Southeast Asia (called "Nanyang" in China.). The Treaty of Beijing between China and Britain made in 1860 stipulated that "Chinese people are allowed to go abroad to work." Later, due to famine and limited farming land in Fujian and Guangdong provinces, many people went to Southeast Asia to make a living. Most of those who survived the long journey then became "contract laborers," colloquially called "coolies" or "piglets". According to their contracts with the smugglers, the laborers spent the first three years of their work "paying back debts" to the smugglers, with most of their wages. Their fates vary: some returned to China; some died due to the hard working and living conditions; and some stayed.

=== Early Years of the Republic of China ===
In 1912, after the establishment of the Republic of China, the Provisional Government issued the "Order Prohibiting the Buying and Selling of People". This ended the practice of selling piglets in China. In 1916 (the 5th year of the Republic of China), Malaya and its British colonies were the first to abolish the indentured labor system. This marked the end of the piglet system.

The period from 1926 (Republic of China Year 15) to 1937 (Republic of China Year 26) marked the second large-scale migration to Southeast Asia. This migration was caused by warlordism civil wars and natural disasters across China. Later, Japan seized the opportunity to invade and occupy China, ultimately resulting in a second large-scale migration.

After the founding of the People's Republic of China on October 1, 1949, in the 1950s, the growing Chinese sense of returning to their roots, coupled with a gradually stabilizing situation in China, brought an end to the century-long large-scale migration to Southeast Asia.

== Nanyang ==
Nanyang
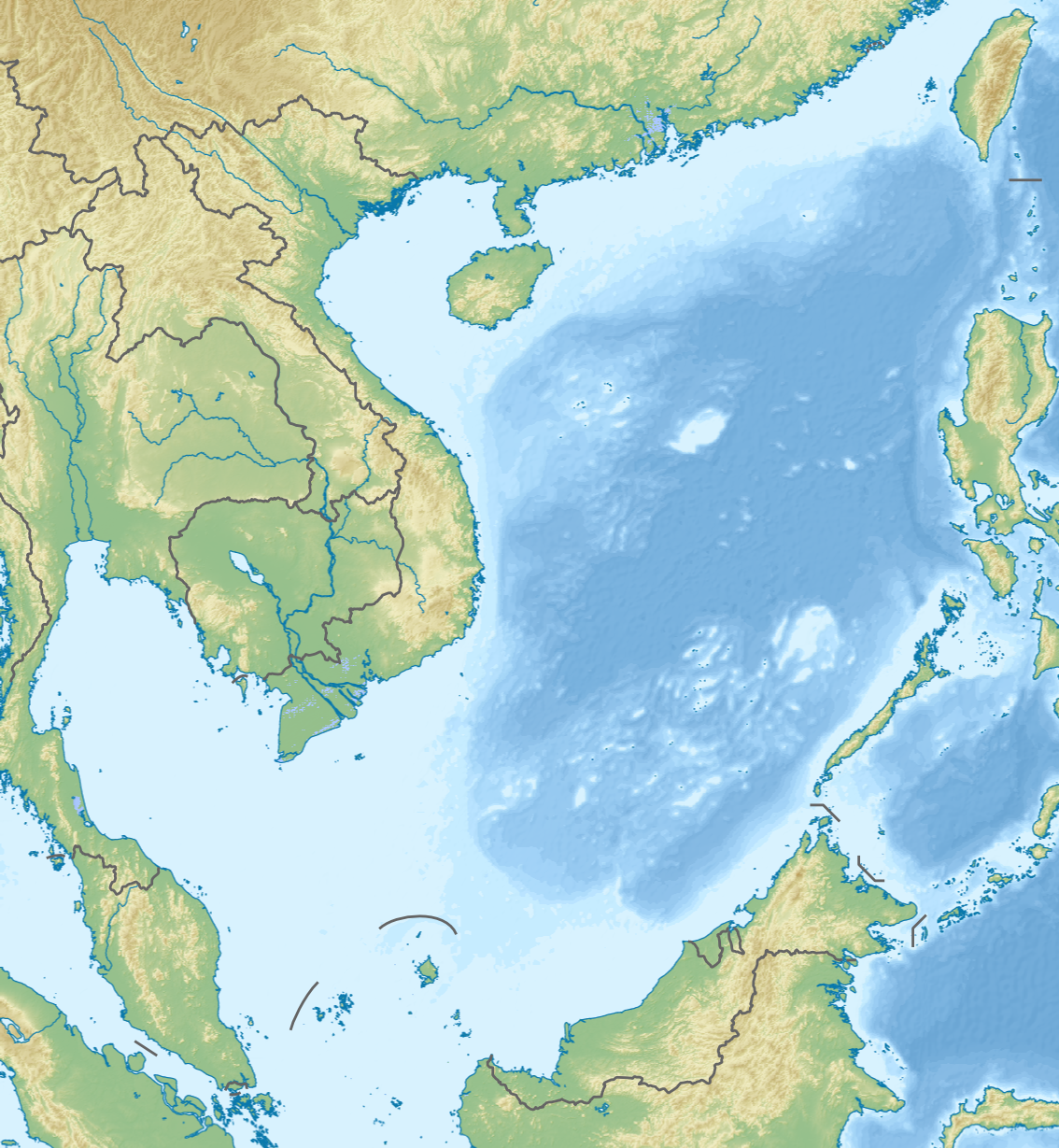
- The states to the south of China around the South China Sea are regarded as part of Nanyang
- Chinese: 南洋
Transcriptions
Standard Mandarin
- Hanyu Pinyin: Nányáng
- Wade–Giles: Nan2-yang2
- IPA: /na̠n˧˥ i̯ɑŋ˧˥/
Hakka
- Pha̍k-fa-sṳ: Nàm-yòng
Yue: Cantonese
- Yale Romanization: nàahm yéung, nàahm yèuhng
- Jyutping: naam4 joeng4-2, naam4 joeng4
- Canton Romanization: nam4 yêng2, nam4 yêng4
- IPA: /nɑːm˨˩ jœːŋ˨˩⁻˧˥/, /nɑːm˨˩ jœːŋ˨˩/
Southern Min
- Hokkien POJ: Lâm-iûⁿ, Lâm-iôⁿ
- Tâi-lô: Lâm-iûnn, Lâm-iônn
Middle Chinese
- Middle Chinese: /nʌm/ /jɨɐŋ/
Old Chinese
- Baxter–Sagart (2014): /*nˤ[ə]m/ /*ɢ(r)aŋ/
- Zhengzhang: /*nuːm/ /*laŋ/

"Nanyang" (Chinese: 南洋; pinyin: Nányáng; lit. 'Southern Ocean') is the Chinese term for the warmer and fertile geographical region along the southern coastal regions of China and beyond, otherwise known as the 'South Sea' or Southeast Asia. The term came into common usage in self-reference to the large ethnic Chinese migrant population in Southeast Asia, and is contrasted with Xiyang (Chinese: 西洋; pinyin: xī yáng; lit. 'Western Ocean'), which refers to the Western world, and Dongyang (simplified Chinese: 东洋; traditional Chinese: 東洋; pinyin: dōng yáng; lit. 'Eastern Ocean'), which refers to Japan. The Chinese press regularly uses the term to refer to the region stretching from Yunnan Province to Singapore (north to south) and from Myanmar (Burma) to Vietnam (west to east); in addition, the term also refers to Brunei, East Malaysia, Timor-Leste, Indonesia and the Philippines in the region it encompasses.

== Qiaopi ==
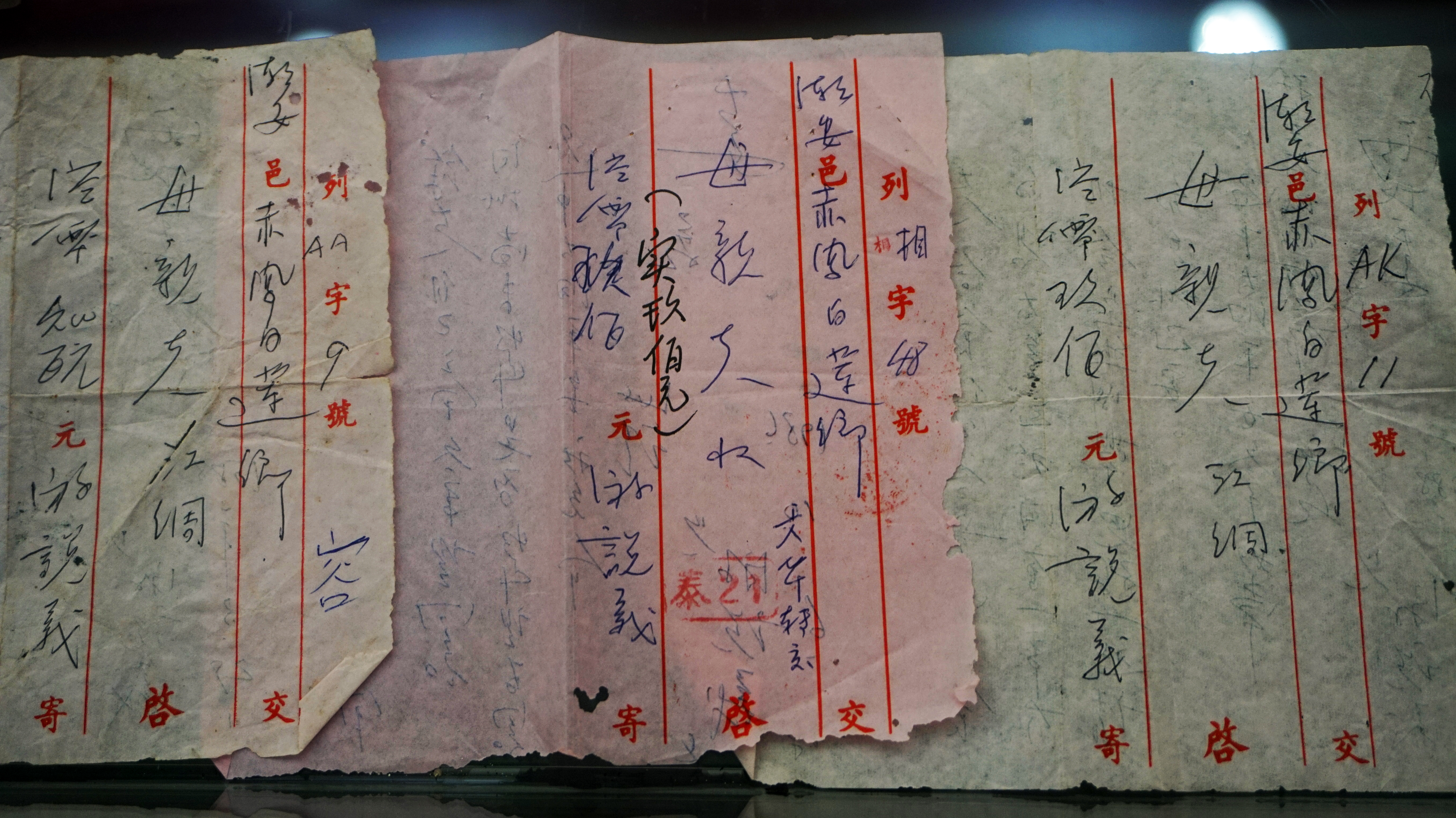
Qiaopi letters

“Qiaopi”, or “Fanpi”, consisted of a letter and money sent by overseas Chinese to their families back in China. Remittance or money is sent together with a letter in a single envelope. Hence, Qiaopi is also called "Yinxin" (银信; yín xìn; 'money letters').

On certain occasions such as a notice of death, a qiaopi may simply be a letter without any money attached. In such a case the qiaopi would be referred to as "baixin (a letter without money)". Only in exceedingly rare occasions would a baixin contain some money.

In 2012, qiaopi was added to the Asia-Pacific Memory of the World Register. And in 2013, it was added to the International Memory of the World Register.

== Other information ==
The people in southern Fujian Province and eastern Guangdong Province refer to Xia Nanyang as "Guo Fan", literally "going to a foreign land". And the immigrants are called "Guo Fan ke" or "Fanke", where "ke" means "guest".

At present, there are about 700 million people living in Southeast Asia, including Singapore, Malaysia, Indonesia, Thailand, Vietnam, the Philippines, and other countries. Among them about 40 millions (5.71%) are Chinese.

Singapore is the only country with a majority of its population being Chinese (2 million, or over 75 percent, of the national population of 3 million). Ethnic Chinese Malaysians make up approximately 22.1% of the country's population, numbering roughly 6.9 to 7.4 million people. In Indonesia 5 to 6 million or 3 percent. In Thailand, 5 to 6 million; in the Philippines, 600,000; in Cambodia, 300,000; in Laos, 25,000; in Vietnam, 2 million Chinese. Most Chinese in Southeast Asia live in the cities.

Xia Nanyang, Chuang Guandong and Zou Xikou are the three large-scale population migrations of China since the Qing Dynasty, among which only Xia Nanyang is international.

== See also ==
- Chinese emigration
- Nanyang (region)
- Chuang Guandong
- Zou Xikou
- Chaoshan culture
