= Zou Xikou =

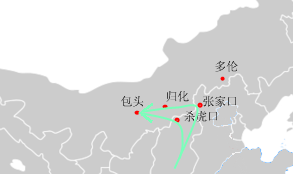
Regional map of Zou Xikou

Zou Xikou (Chinese: 走西口; lit. 'Going through the West Pass'), also called Zou Kouwai (走口外; 'Going outside the pass'), refers to the over four-hundred year activities of migration from the Han Chinese areas of Shanxi, northern Shaanxi, and Hebei within the Great Wall to Inner Mongolia. The purpose was to reclaim wasteland and in search of survival opportunities due to insufficient resources in North China during the Ming and Qing dynasties and the early Republic of China. "Xikou" (West Pass) refers to several passes at the western end of the Ming Great Wall, including Shahu Pass (杀虎口).

Zou Xikou is one of the three major population migrations in modern Chinese history， the others being Chuang Guandong and Xia Nanyang.

== West passes ==
In Chinese history, the word "Pass" (口) originally referred to the passes of the Ming Great Wall. After the Ming Dynasty and Mongolia opened up trade, these military defense passes became trading ports for Han-Mongolian trade. Two of them were the most important: one was Zhangjiakou in Hebei Province, called the "East Pass"; the other was Shahu Pass in Shanxi Province, called "West Pass" (Xikou). However, During the journey westward, all passes along the Great Wall west of Zhangjiakou, bordering northern Shanxi, northern Shaanxi inside the wall and Inner Mongolia outsie the wall, may be called "West Pass." They include the passes in Guihua City (present-day Hohhot), Baotou, and the Shahu Pass.

The phrase "Zou Xikou" (going west) later became a general term referring to going from Shanxi, Shaanxi, and Hebei to the areas outside (the passes of) the Great Wall for immigration or business. And Zou Xikou is also called "Zou Kouwai" (走口外, going outside the pass).

== History ==
=== Initials ===
In 1572, a peace treaty was signed, and the Ming Dynasty court (government) opened up trade routes along the Great Wall with Mongolia. Later, a small number of Han Chinese from the interior began to cross the Great Wall to seek a living in Mongolia.

In the early Qing dynasty (1636-1912), in order to isolate the Mongols and Han Chinese, the Qing court strictly prohibited soldiers and civilians from "cultivating pastures outside the pass". Han Chinese were not allowed to cross the pass privately. However, the ban was not absolute. Emperor Shunzhi allowed a small number of people from Shanxi, Shaanxi, and Hebei to cultivate land in Mongolia, but they had to go in spring and return in autumn, and were not allowed to settle there or bring relatives. This led to the emergence of a group of "wild goose herders" who planted in spring and returned in autumn.

=== First Wave ===
In the early years of the Jiaqing Emperor's reign (1796 – 1820), the Qing government abolished the customs inspection system for those leaving the country, and the migration of people from the interior to the west became a widespread trend. A large number of immigrants gradually shifted from migrating in formation to settling down permanently, and began to gain population dominance in some settlements.

=== Second Wave ===
The second wave lasted from the Guangxu era (1889 – 1908) to the Republic of China era. At that time, the country was plagued by internal and external troubles, political corruption, serious land annexation, and rapid population growth, resulting in a large number of landless peasants. Especially after the signing of the Boxer Protocol in 1901, the Qing Dynasty was eager to raise huge indemnities and opened up Mongolian lands to Han people in full, despite the opposition of the Mongols. The government collected a deposit of silver from immigrants who came to reclaim the land. After paying the money, they could have permanent land use rights. In the 28th year of Guangxu (1902), the Qing court appointed Yi Gu as the Minister in charge of Mongolian Banner reclamation. He measured Mongolian lands in the nomadic areas of Ulanqab, Ikezhao League and Chahar Eight Banners and carried out reclamation. The Qing government encouraged Han people in the interior to settle beyond the border. By the early years of the Republic of China, the number of Han people in Inner Mongolia (including the eastern Mongolia in the area of Chuang Guandong) had reached 3 million, far exceeding the local indigenous population.

== Geographical Factors ==
The immigrants mainly came from western and northern Shanxi and northern Shaanxi. These areas are located on the Loess Plateau, with harsh natural environments: sparse vegetation, infertile soil, and frequent natural disasters. The devastating famine of 1875-1878 occurred in the early years of the Guangxu Emperor's reign. Years of drought left many villages and fields barren, resulting in complete crop failure.

The Hetao Plain outside the Great Wall was a vast, flat grassland with relatively fertile land, abundant water and grass, and a sparse population. As a result, a large number of disaster victims migrated to the Hetao Plain area in central and western Inner Mongolia (which was part of Suiyuan Province during the Republic of China era), including Guihua City (present-day Hohhot), the Ordos League (present-day Ordos), and the Ulanqab League (including the suburbs of Hohhot and cities such as Baotou and Bayannur).

== Impact ==
The westward migration facilitated social integration, trade, and cultural exchange among Shanxi, Shaanxi, Hebei, and Suiyuan, and also fostered factors for social change. The westward migration led to more Han Chinese migrating beyond the Great Wall, resulting in a predominantly Han population in Suiyuan and Chahar provinces at the beginning of the Republic of China. This migration significantly altered the social, economic, and lifestyle structures of the Mongolian region outside the Great Wall, recording the ebb and flow of nomadic and agricultural cultures.

Baotou was first established by the Qiao family from Shanxi, who opened a shop with the name "Fu", which gradually grew into a town and then a city. Hence the saying, "First came the Fu shop, then came Baotou city."

However, the westward migration, as a spontaneous wave of civilian migration, also had many negative aspects. Firstly, rampant banditry; given the weak official control at the time, the destitute easily turned to banditry, causing the region to deviate from normal order for a considerable period. Secondly, widespread opium cultivation and widespread opium addiction. Thirdly, irrational development led to ecological damage. The blind reclamation by immigrants destroyed the original ecosystem of the grasslands, resulting in adverse consequences such as grassland shrinkage, soil erosion, and desertification. The recent sandstorms in northern China are related to the unreasonable development of the area.

== Other information ==
Zou Xikou has also created its own culture, including operas, and songs. In 2020, the 12th Xikou Cultural Festival opened in Baotou.

The ancient Shanxi folk song "Going West" is said to have been passed down for one or two hundred years. Many people in the west can sing it, and it is also sung by people in Shaanxi, Ningxia, Qinghai, and Gansu.

There is a historical drama produced by the China Central Television and Hongji Century (Beijing) Culture Media Co., Ltd.

The people who went west included traders, able-bodied men seeking to cultivate the land, and social outcasts trying to evade military service and legal troubles. Many of them started as apprentices or laborers, and through business activities such as trading and opening shops, they saved money and became business people.

Zou Xikou is one of the three major population migrations in modern Chinese history，the others being Chuang Guandong and Xia Nanyang.

== See also ==
- Chinese emigration
- Chuang Guandong
- Xia Nanyang
