= Qiaopi =

Type of correspondence consisting of a letter and money

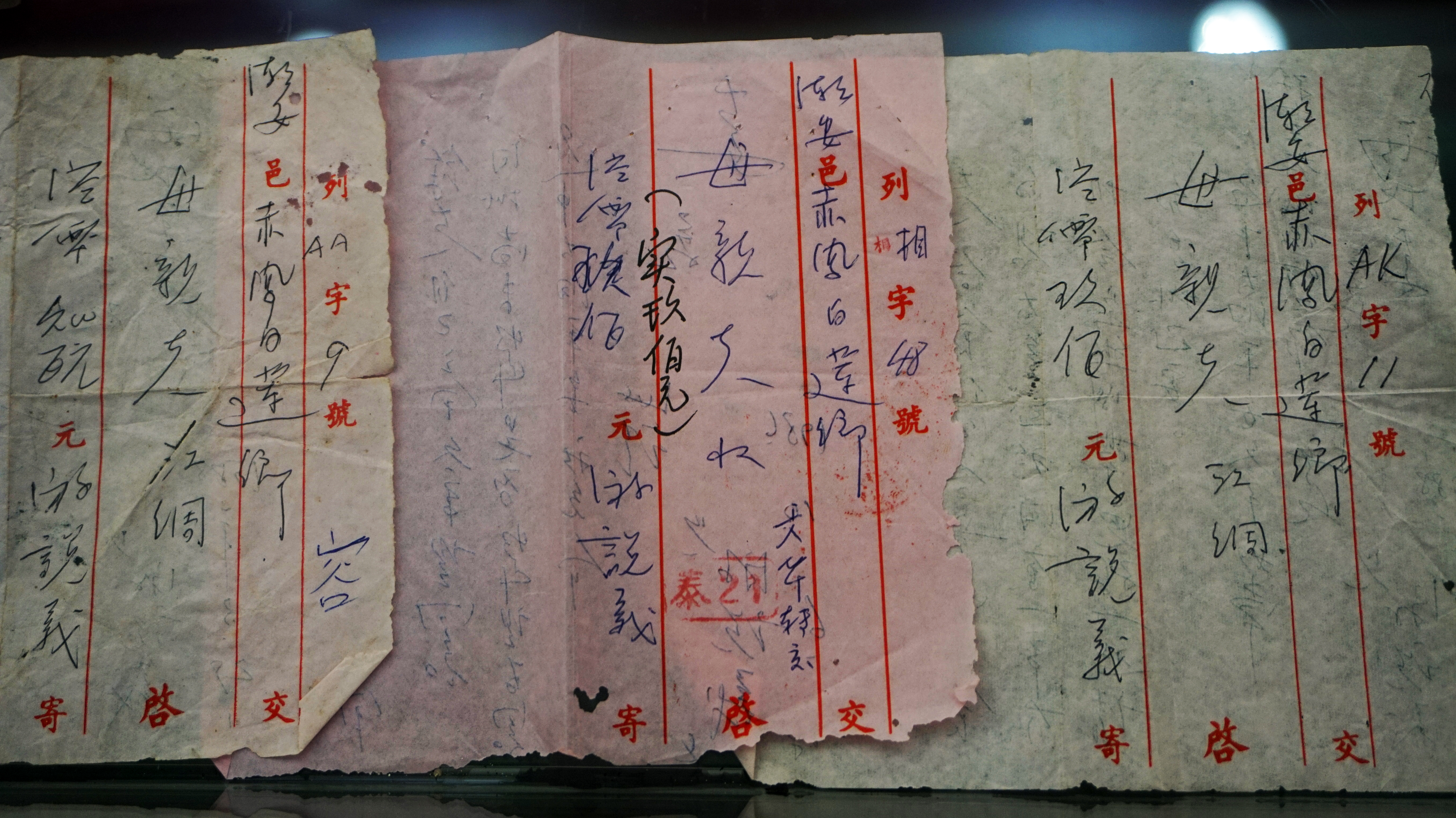
Qiaopi letters

Qiaopi (simplified Chinese: 侨批; traditional Chinese: 僑批), or fanpi (Chinese: 番批), consisted of a letter and money sent by overseas Chinese to their families back in China. Remittance money (referred to as qiaohui) or silver or money (pikuan) were sent together with a letter (pixin) in a single envelope. Qiaopi is sometimes referred to as zhengpi ("main pi") or silver letters (银信; yin xin).

On certain occasions such as a notice of death, a qiaopi might simply be a letter without any money attached. In such a case the qiaopi would be referred to as "baixin" (a letter without money). Only on exceedingly rare occasions would a baixin contain money.

In 2012, qiaopi was added to the Asia-Pacific Memory of the World Register. In 2013, it was added to the International Memory of the World Register.

== Background ==
Qiaopi arose out of the desire of the overseas Chinese community to financially support the families they had left in their qiaoxiang — hometown of the overseas Chinese in China — and to remain connected with them.

=== Shuike ===
Qiaopi were transported by shuike (水客), who were also known as “parallel traders” or “couriers”. A shuike could be anyone travelling back to China. A “courier” was heading back to China for personal reasons and making use of the opportunity by helping to deliver qiaopi from kinsmen back to their home village. In contrast, “parallel traders” could travel to and from various diasporic Chinese communities back to China given the nature of their job. Parallel traders would also engage couriers to move the qiaopi back to China. Ship captains and ship crews also sometimes transported and delivered qiaopi.

=== Qiaopiju ===
Qiaopiju (侨批局; "Chinese remittance shop"), also known as piju (“remittance shop”), began as “a trading company to handle remittances”, established in 1757 by Chen Chenliu. In 1778, another person by the name of Li Kan, following the example set by Chen Chenliu, set up a similar company in Singapore. However, the general consensus is that qiaopiju “in the modern sense first formed in the early to mid-nineteenth century in various regions in China and in Chinese diasporic communities. Qiaopiju also formed due to the ties between shuike and physical shops, along with the increasing establishment of trade routes over the years due to the advent of modern steamships. It has been argued that the qiaopiju would become “the most important institution for the qiaopi trade”.

== History ==
The qiaopi trade was similar to how postal and remittance systems work today. It can be considered a "private mail delivery system". The system transcended national borders and various Chinese ethnic groups. It is possible to trace the origins of the qiaopi to the time of the Ming Dynasty during the reign of Jiajing. Some sources have argued that qiaopi had existed even before the Ming Dynasty. Early qiaopi were said to have originated from areas in the Philippines and Thailand, where letters were sent together with silver by overseas Chinese back to China. Overall, it is believed that qiaopi originated from “Southeast Asia in the 17th century.” It has been argued that the delivery of qiaopi arose independently and “fairly randomly” in various oversea Chinese communities. It is was largely “opportunistic” in nature, relying on the willingness of fellow kinsmen travelling back to China to transport the qiaopi. In the early days of the qiaopi trade, most if not all of the shuike were “first-generation emigrants” who had close ties with overseas Chinese communities related to their clan or ethnic group. Some shuike did not have such ties to a diasporic community or a community back in China and would need to have someone who would guarantee their conduct. Ties of kinship were very important given that shuike were unwilling to bring shame to the name of their clan by conducting themselves improperly or illegally.

=== Early qiaopi trade ===
Shuike would sail to and from China delivering qiaopi in person. Delivery trips made by shuike were few and far between. Trips could be made every other year, but not more than once a year. As demand for qiaopi services surged and as trade routes became more established, shuike from Southeast Asia made trips more frequently, about two to four times per year. Shuike from the Philippines in particular made the journey to and from China much more frequently, on average five to six times a year, depending on the monsoon winds. In Singapore, shuike would make use of monsoon winds, sailing down to Singapore with the northeast monsoon in December and returning to China with the southwest monsoon in June. The delivery fee for qiaopi would cost around 10 to 20 percent of the amount remitted, depending on distance and the amount of money sent. The rate would decrease to around 3 percent as the number of shuike increased, but ultimately it “depended on the remittance's size and the distance to be travelled by the courier”. Sometimes no fees were charged for the delivery of qiaopi, such as when a shuike was delivering for family or friends. Other times, shuike known as “commercial shuike” appropriated the qiaopi money for business purposes.These shuike would then use the profits made from the business venture with the appropriated qiaopi money for the delivery of the remittance. Business ventures included “speculating on exchange rates” and selling overseas goods bought using qiaopi money in China for a profit. At the height of the qiaopi trade, thousands of shuike were plying this trade. Upon receipt of the qiaopi by the intended recipients, an acknowledgement would be returned to the sender. This acknowledgement of receipt of a qiaopi is called a huipi (回批). Apart from being a form of acknowledgement, the huipi was used to inform the sender about life in the home village. The shuike would help to write the huipi after staying for a time to learn about what was happening in the village and disseminate news from abroad.

Delivery by shuike was plagued by a number of problems. It was very slow, and it could take months to complete a delivery. The use of qiaopi in trade, which entailed the handing the qiaopi from trader to trader, created opportunities for errors and mistakes. There was a risk of failure arising from business ventures. Handling large sums of money tempted shuike to misappropriate the money despite the trust-based system and the idea of personal and clan honour. This temptation grew along with the growth in qiaopi trade following an increase in the migration of Chinese overseas. The increase in dishonest shuike greatly eroded the trust-based system and ultimately discredited the idea of a personal relationship ensuring honesty.

=== Qiaopi trade after the Second Opium War ===
The Second Opium War resulted in the opening of new ports in China following the unequal treaties by Western powers and the Qing government abandoning its controls on foreign travel. Chinese migration out of China increased significantly with the beginning of steamship travel to and from China. Transport by steamships meant that travel was less dependent on the winds than sailing, which greatly increased the scale of qiaopi transport businesses. The speed and ease of travel with steam ships would allow shuike to make more trips than they normally would. The volume of qiaopi sent increased significantly after the Beijing convention of 1860. With the introduction of Western institutions such as the post office and Western banking technology, shuike increasingly opted for money transfers and letter delivery using the postal or banking services.

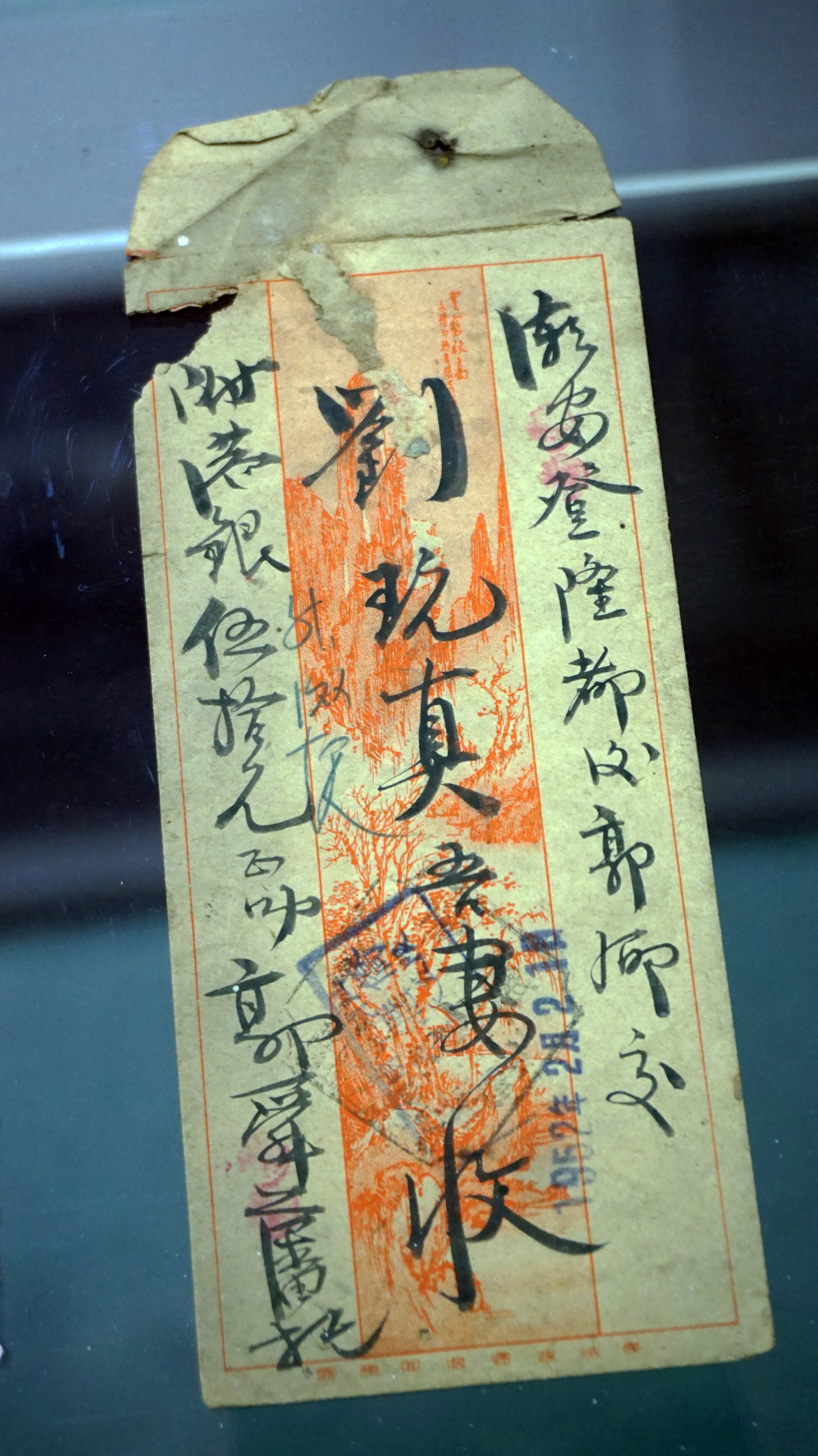
A qiaopi envelope also known as a pikuan.

The establishment of physical shop spaces presented an image of “stability” compared to the roaming shuike. This laid the foundation for the establishment of qiaopiju, as shuike began to settle and form institutions. Following the introduction of Western banking technology and postal institutions, shuike would remit money using post offices or banks. The transport of qiaopi by shuike sailing to and from China would gradually be replaced with qiaopiju (侨批局; "Chinese remittance shop", "Chinese remittance house"). Qiaopiju made use of postal and banking services to move qiaopi back to China. The headquarters of various qiaopiju were located in Southeast Asia, with “branches” back in China. These branch offices would be located in coastal cities like Shantou, Xiamen, or in the urban areas of coastal provinces like Fujian and Guangdong. A remitter would give the money that was to be remitted to the qiaopiju, which would convert the local currency to Chinese money “and provide the remitter with a receipt”. The personal particulars of the remitter would be registered with a serial number. At the same time, the remitter would provide the qiaopiju with a “family letter” and could seek help from the qiaopiju to help write the letter on their behalf if they were illiterate. The amount of money that was to be remitted was indicated on the envelope. The envelope was known as a “pikuan” (批款). A piece of paper measuring “8cm wide and 12.5cm long” for the purpose of acknowledgment of receipt of the qiaopi by the intended recipient would be placed in an envelope stamped with the mark of the qiaopiju as well as the specific “dispatch code”. This envelope, which measured “5cm long by 2.5cm wide”, would be attached to the back of the larger pikuan envelope.

Upon receipt of both the remittance and the family letter, the qiaopiju would purchase Chinese currency and conduct a “telegraphic transfer” of the funds to be remitted. The funds would be transferred to the qiaopiju branch in China. Concurrently, the family letter would be sent via the postal service to the qiaopiju branch in China. When both the family letter and the money reached the qiaopiju branch, both would be sent together to the intended recipient. Upon receipt of both the money and the letter, the recipient would reply or seek someone's help to reply on their behalf. The reply was known as huipi. The process no longer involved the physical movement of shuike delivering qiaopi and coming face-to-face with the remitter's family back in China to write the huipi. Despite the shift, shuike continued to remain relevant even in the 1960s especially in areas lacking modern infrastructure.

=== Qiaopi trade during the Second World War ===
The qiaopi trade during wartime was facilitated by “the Yokohama Specie Bank, the Oversea Chinese Banking Corporation (OCBC), and the qiaopiju in Chaoshan”. Under the Japanese occupation, it was the banks and qiaopiju that were not hostile to the Japanese or collaborated with the Japanese that were allowed to continue the qiaopi trade. Despite close Japanese monitoring of the flow of funds, qiaopi money was delivered to the intended recipients back home in China. Qiaopiju found a way to skirt Japanese control and monitoring. The occupation of Singapore and Hong Kong in 1941 meant that the Shantou post office could no longer deliver qiaopi using the established Singapore-Hong Kong route. While the postal services were no longer conducting qiaopi trade as a result of the war and Japanese occupation, qiaopiju sent qiaopi “via Móng Cái in Vietnam to the Dongxing route”. Dongxing is “a small city located just inside the border between Guangxi province and Vietnam”. As French Indochina was independent of Japanese rule, this allowed the Chinese diasporic community in Southeast Asia to continue to send qiaopi outside the Japanese-monitored qiaopi trade route. Due to the destruction of infrastructure along with the lack of bank transfers and postal services due to the war and Japanese occupation, delivery by shuike became relevant and important again. The Dongxing route would vanish rapidly following the end of the war as the qiaopi trade went back to the Singapore-Hong Kong route.

== Challenges faced by qiaopi traders ==
=== Attempts by authorities to control the qiaopi trade ===
There were various attempts by both colonial and Chinese authorities to control the qiaopi trade. Various authorities had mixed success through various means such as “licensing”. Controls by various governments increasingly made the role of shuike or running a qiaopiju fraught with risk. “Interference, extortion, blackmail, prohibitions, fines, police raids, confiscations, expropriation, and arrest" were some of the many risks faced by people in the qiaopi trade. In the 1930s, the Chinese postal services worked together with the customs authorities to clamp down on qiaopi smuggling by the qiaopiju. In 1914, newly introduced legislation made the “licensing” of qiaopi traders mandatory and attempting to carry out the transport of qiaopi was considered smuggling. Despite this, noncompliance was widespread, and in the case of Shantou province, none of the 75 qiaopiju had license to operate. “Smugglers” transported more huipi and qiaopi compared to traders that were licensed. Chinese authorities tried several times to gain control over the valuable qiaopi trade to no effect. For example, in the case of Singapore, British authorities established a "sub-post office" that would handle the qiaopi trade. It would be compulsory for all qiaopiju in Singapore to have all qiaopi be “stamped and sent through the Chinese sub-post office”.

=== Coexistence ===
While a small part of the qiaopi trade relied on various postal agencies established in the 19th century, the connections qiaopiju had with rural villages in China gave qiaopiju the edge over the postal services. Qing China established its own postal service in the period of 1896–1897 with a regional branch established in 1892 in Xiamen. The Xiamen branch would be dedicated to the transport of qiaopi in 1896. In the early part of the 20th century, Chinese postal services continued to face challenges in wresting control of the qiaopi trade from the shuike and the qiaopi despite having physical spaces at over 1300 locations across China. Most of these “branches” would be in urban areas away from the rural areas of China where many Chinese migrants came from. Likewise, banks faced problems taking over the role of shuike and qiaopiju in controlling the qiaopi trade. The complex procedures for remitting money through banks discouraged would-be remitters from using the service. The qiaopiju continued to survive due to their rich expertise and long-established good standing with the customers. Sending qiaopi with existing qiaopiju or shuike was comparably faster and more dependable compared to the banks and postal services. Small sums saved by individuals could be remitted with ease. Over 80 percent of the remittances were small sums of money below 300 yuan. Even smaller sums of money below 100 yuan constituted over a quarter of remittances, while larger sums of money over 400 yuan only constituted a tenth of all “family-maintenance remittances”. Most of the qiaopi sent were still handled by shuike and qiaopiju. Banks and postal services handled less than 20 percent of the qiaopi sent until 1937.

=== Competition ===
While qiaopiju continued to survive, competition from banks and postal services increased starting from the third decade of the 20th century. The Chinese postal services had to copy the efficiency of qiaopiju to find success in the qiaopi trade. Chinese postal services gradually expanded into rural villages which were often the home towns of the Chinese diasporic community. The postal services improved administration and organisation, and collaborated with banks to facilitate the delivery of money. Chinese postal authorities were gradually given more power. In 1914, China joined the Universal Postal Union (UPU), giving the Chinese postal authority more legitimacy, although there was no central Chinese authority during this Warlord Era period. In 1927, China was reunified, allowing for the consolidation of power and authority. This greatly weakened the position of the qiaopiju. In 1935, mandatory licensing with mandatory yearly renewal of the license was enforced with the postal authorities granted oversight over the issuing and renewal of licenses. Qiaopiju that previously smuggled qiaopi could be denied licenses. In addition to increasing control by Chinese authorities, a loophole which the qiaopiju exploited to deliver huipi or qiaopi letters at a relatively low cost was closed. Qiaopiju would send a “clubbed packet”, which was an envelope which contained many letters written on small pieces of paper, to reduce postage cost. Colonial authorities quickly outlawed the “clubbed packet system” and Chinese authorities were compelled to do the same as well. The postage rate for sending huipi was slowly increased, and the postal service in Guangdong province made the large income of 100,000 yuan in 1932. Despite the “reform”, Chinese postal services were plagued by corruption, dishonest misappropriation of qiaopi money, inefficient overlapping of job roles, and pressuring customers for favours. Despite the breakthrough made by the postal services into the monopoly held by qiaopiju and shuike, the problems plaguing the postal services turned customers away from using the service.

== End of the qiaopi trade ==
Chinese migration overseas decreased significantly following the formation of the People's Republic of China (PRC) in 1949, while the number of Chinese born overseas in diasporic communities increased. As the colonies of Southeast Asia gained their independence, Chinese emigrants gradually assimilated into new national identities, slowly losing their ties with China. Apart from demographic changes and political changes the advancement of banking technology and the comparatively lower rates of inflation, prompted diasporic Chinese to remit money by bank transfer instead of using qiaopi. The stabilisation of the internal situation in China made sending letters by postal services easier. The qiaopi trade, which started with the purpose of connecting the Chinese diasporic community with their home villages in China, gradually lost its importance and relevance. From 1958 to 1964, the amount of money sent annually by the diasporic Chinese community in Singapore and Malaya was 14 million RMB on average. In this period, most remittance money was sent by bank transfer. In 1973, the People's Bank of China assumed control of qiaopi after the passing of a state directive. In 1979, people in charge of the qiaopi trade were assimilated into state-owned Chinese banks, and banks took over the role of the qiaopi traders in facilitating remittances. After this point, qiaopi fully lost their relevance and became obsolete, replaced by the banks and postal services.

== See also ==
- Xia Nanyang
- Teochew letters
- Postage stamps and postal history of China
- Universal Postal Union
