= Willow Palisade =

System of ditches and embankments

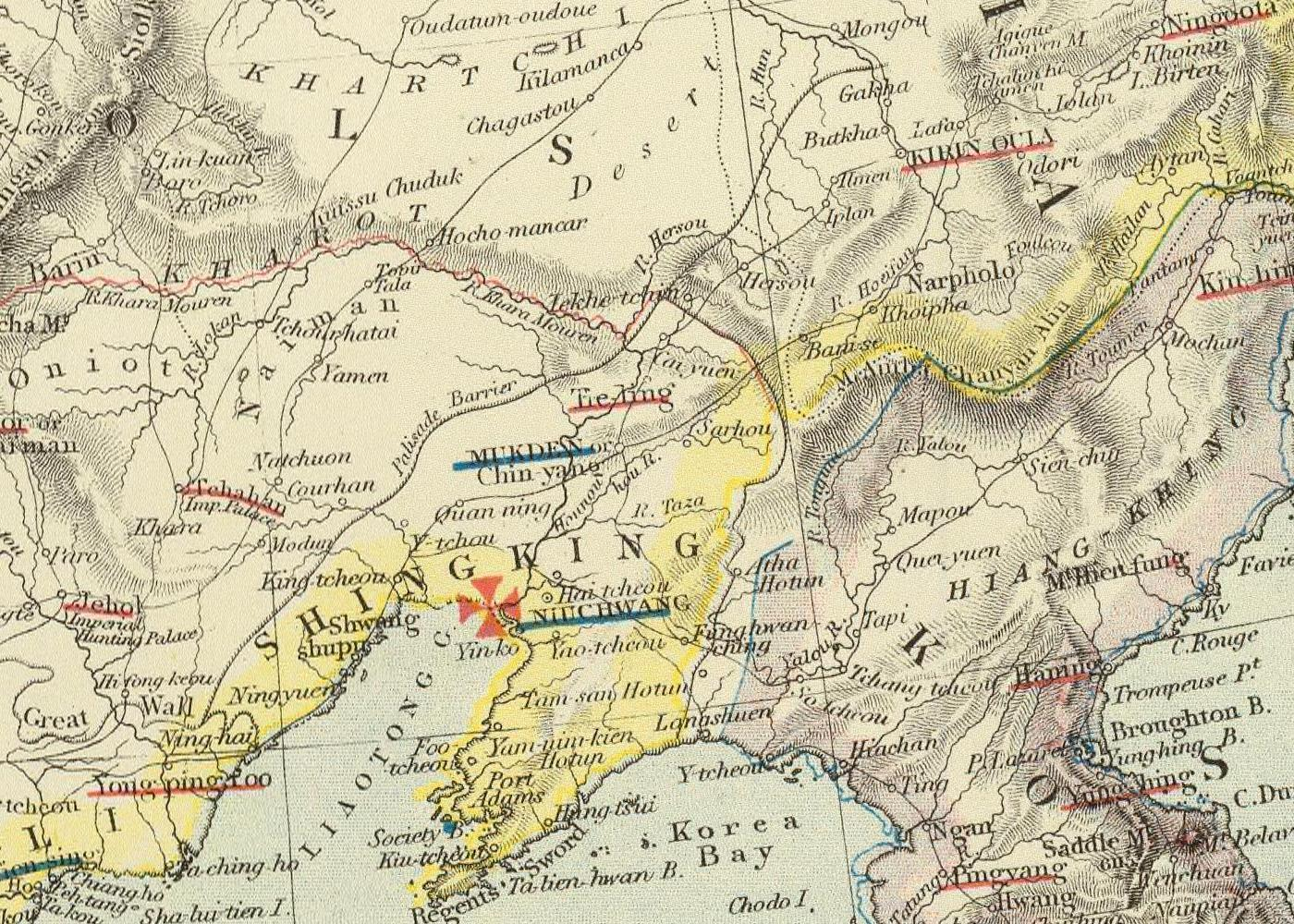
The three sections of the Willow Palisade on an 1883 map

The Willow Palisade (Chinese: 柳條邊; pinyin: Liǔtiáo Biān; Manchu: ᠪᡳᡵᡝᡤᡝᠨ
ᠵᠠᠰᡝ, romanized: Biregen Jase) was a system of ditches and embankments that was planted with willows, intended to restrict movement into Manchuria (including Northeast China and Outer Manchuria), and was built by the Qing dynasty of China during the late 17th century. It is often conveniently divided into three connected sections: the western and eastern sections, forming the Inner Willow Palisade around Liaodong Peninsula, and the northern section, also known as the Outer Willow Palisade, separating the traditionally Manchu areas (to the east) from the traditionally-Mongol area (to the west) north of the Inner Palisade.

== Layout ==
Manchuria borders Mongolia in the west, the Russian Far East in the north, China proper to the south and Korea in the southeast. Manchuria has access to the Yellow Sea and the Bohai Sea to the south, while Outer Manchuria (Primorsky Krai, Khabarovsk Krai and Amur Oblast in Russia) has access to the Sea of Japan and the Sea of Okhotsk to the east and northeast.

To the south, the Inner Willow Palisade separated Jilin from China proper; it restricted the movement of Han civilians into Jilin and Heilongjiang during the Qing dynasty (1644–1912), as the area was off-limits to Han civilians until the Qing started populating the area with them from the late 18th century. Only bannermen were allowed to settle in the area beyond the Willow Palisade. This palisade, often conventionally divided into the eastern and western sections, started in the hills near the Great Wall of China (inland from Shanhaiguan) and ran northeast toward a point located some 33 km north of Kaiyuan, Liaoning, where the Outer Palisade (see below) joined the Inner Palisade. From this junction point the eastern section of the Inner Palisade went eastward, toward the Korean border, and eventually southward, ending near the mouth of the Yalu River.

With an exception of the northernmost segment (north of Kaiyuan), both eastern and western sections of the Inner Palisade ran either outside of the old Liaodong Wall (the defensive wall built by the Ming dynasty in the 15th century to protect the agricultural heartland of Liaoning from incursions by Mongols and Jianzhou Jurchens), or, in places, reused parts of the old wall.

The Outer Willow Palisade separated the Manchu area from modern-day Inner Mongolia; it kept the Manchu and the Mongols in the area separate. This Outer Palisade, often also described as the northern section of the palisade system, started at the junction point of the three sections (north of Kaiyuan) and ran to the north-east, ending soon after crossing the Sungari River north of Jilin City, near the town of Fate (法特, within Shulan County-level city, at 44°29′N 126°31′E).

== Design ==
While the design of different parts of the palisade varied greatly, and changed with time, the palisades, according to the research of the modern geographer R.L. Edmonds, typically consisted of two parallel earthen levees 3 chi (just over 1 meter) high and wide, separated by a trench that was about 1 zhang (3.5 m) deep and 1 zhang wide. Rows of willow trees were planted on top of the levees, each tree's branches being tied to those of its neighbors. Certain sections of the palisades system coincided with the old (Ming dynasty) Liaodong Wall - the extension of the Great Wall of China meant to protect the Ming Liaoning from the Manchus - and there no willows needed to be planted.

The palisades system gradually deteriorated with time, so that by the late Qing it was mostly composed of only one levee with willows on top and a moat on the outer side of it.

There were a number of gates in all three sections of the Willow Palisade, each one garrisoned by a few tens of soldiers. The locations of the gates changed sometimes, but their total number stayed at 20 or 21 during most of the Qing era.

== History ==
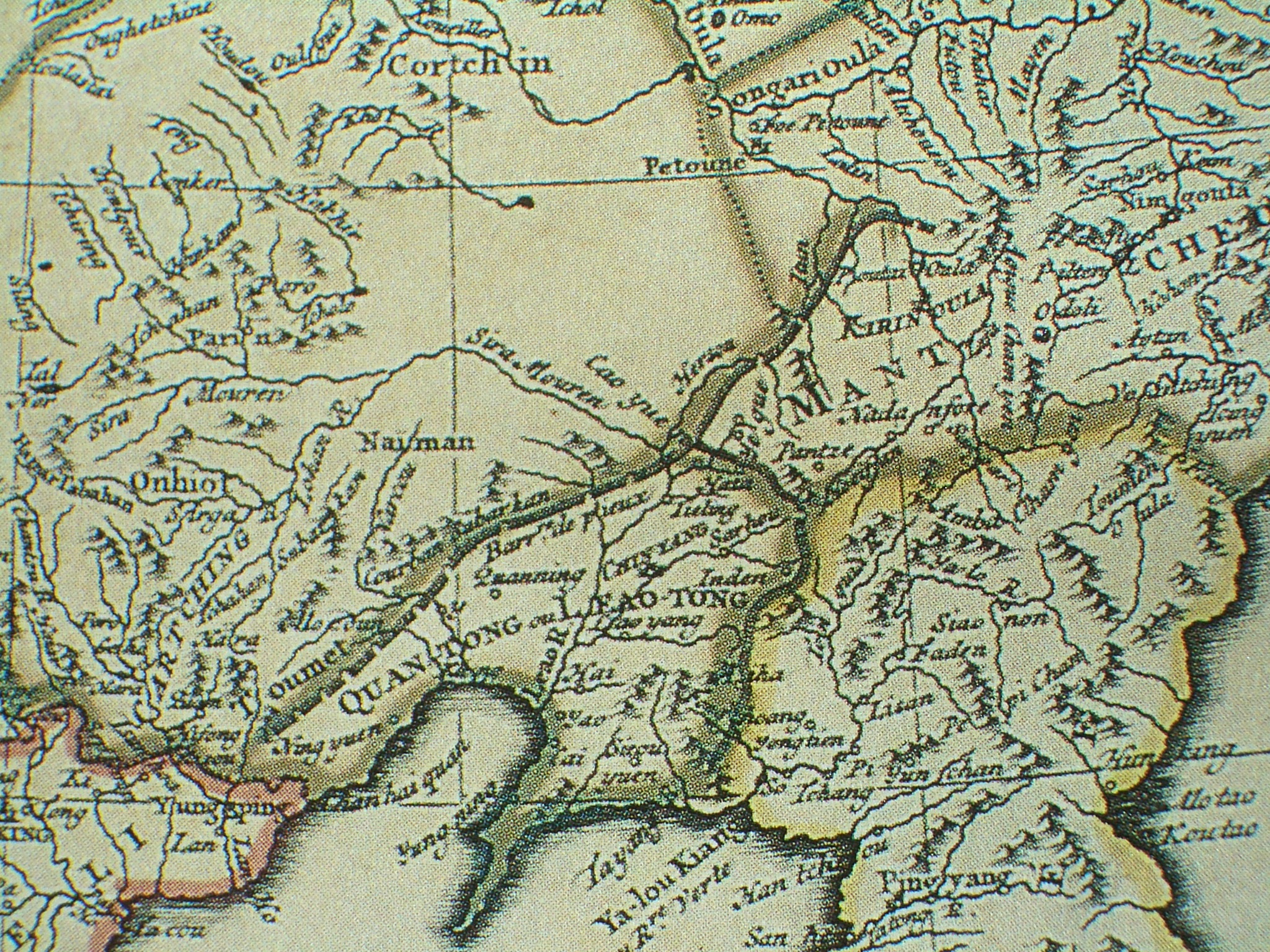
All three sections of the Willow Palisade (Barriere de Pieux) on an early 18th-century French map. The eastern and western sections delimit Liaodong (Leao-Tong), and the northern sections runs to the northeast of Jilin City (Kirin Oula)

Construction of the western section of the system (separating Liaoning from the Mongol lands in the west) is thought to have started in 1648, just four years after the fall of Beijing to the Manchus, and to have been completed before the end of the Shunzhi era (1644–1662). The first gate officers were appointed in 1651–1654. An expansion program, using convict labor, was undertaken in 1676–1679, moving sections of the palisades 20-30 li (12–18 km) west, into the Mongol area.

The construction of the eastern section of the system (the "Inner Willow Palisade" between Liaoning and the Manchus' Jilin) is thought to have started even before the fall of the Ming dynasty in 1644, possibly as early as 1638, and was probably completed by 1672.

The northern section, between the Manchu and Mongol lands, was constructed c. 1681, and therefore known as Xinbian ("The New Palisade").

Originally, the eastern section of the system was meant to prevent the movement of Han civilians from Liaoning (where they usually were tolerated, and sometimes even were encouraged to settle) into the Manchu lands of Jilin, to pick ginseng, poach in the imperial hunting preserves, or even to settle permanently. As the palisade curved south at its eastern end, toward the mouth of the Yalu River, it was also meant to keep settlers from the Yalu River valley, which the early Qing government intended to maintain as an unpopulated "no man's land" along the Joseon border.

Similarly, the western section would keep potential Han settlers from occupying Yangximu pasture lands on the Mongol side of the palisade.

Han civilians were differentiated from Han Bannermen in the Qing. The Qing settled some Han Bannermen in Jilin and Heilongjiang.

Qing authorities resettled Han farmers from northern China to the area along the Liao River in order to restore the land to cultivation. Han squatters and tenants who rented land from Manchu landlords helped to reclaim the wastelands along the river. Despite officially prohibiting Han settlement on the Manchu and Mongol lands, by the 18th century the Qing decided to settle Han refugees from northern China who were suffering from famine, floods, and drought into Manchuria and Inner Mongolia so that Han people farmed 500,000 hectares in Manchuria and tens of thousands of hectares in Inner Mongolia by the 1780s. The Qianlong Emperor allowed Han peasants suffering from drought to move into Manchuria despite him issuing edicts in favor of banning them from 1740 to 1776. Han tenant farmers rented or even claimed title to land from the "imperial estates" and Manchu Bannerlands in the area. Besides moving into the Liao area in southern Manchuria, the path linking Jinzhou, Fengtian, Tieling, Changchun, Hulun, and Ningguta was settled by Han people during the Qianlong Emperor's reign, and Han people were the majority in urban areas of Manchuria by 1800. To increase the Imperial Treasury's revenue, the Qing sold formerly Manchu only lands along the Sungari to Han people at the beginning of the Daoguang Emperor's reign, and Han filled up most of Manchuria's towns by the 1840s according to Abbe Huc.

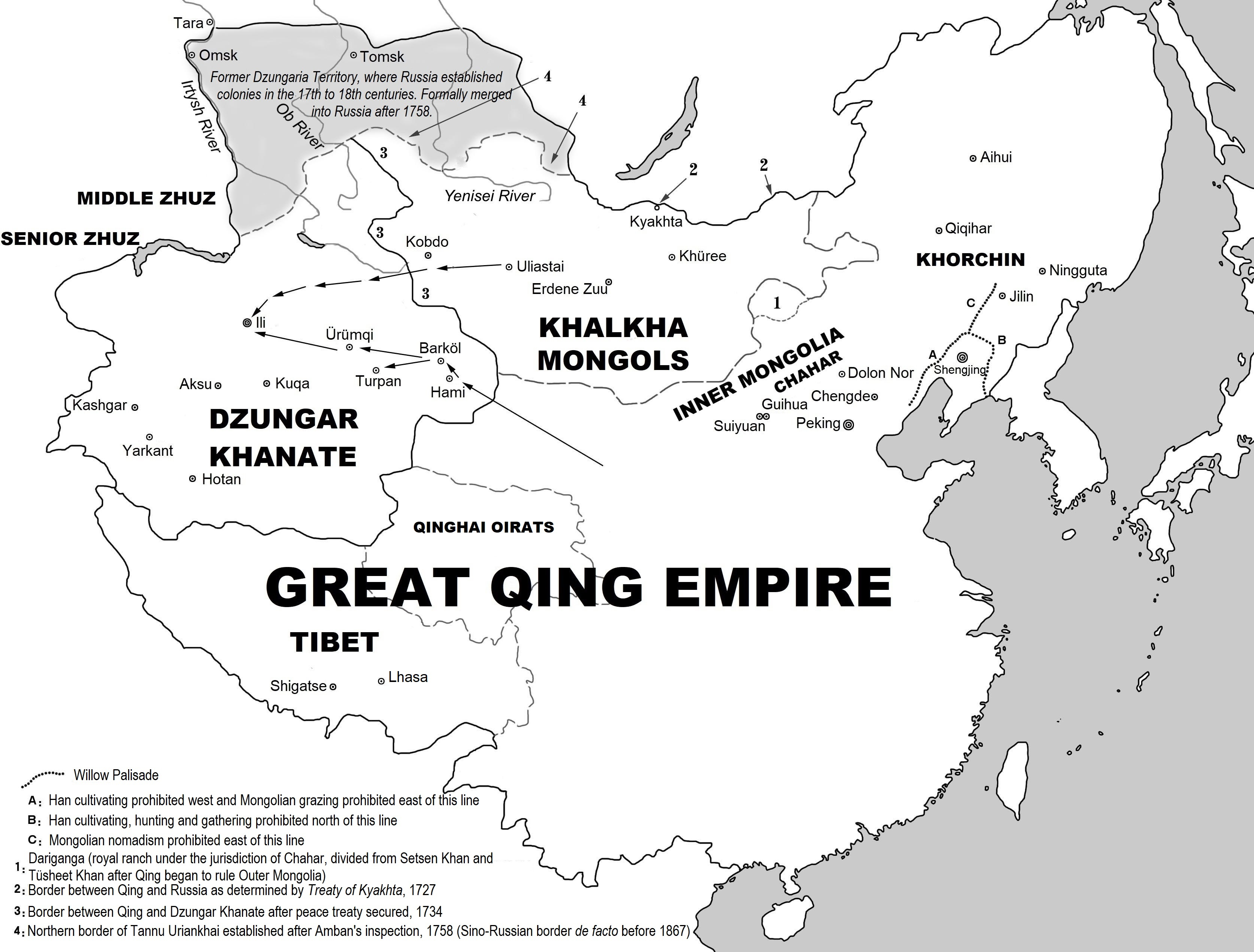
Overview of Qing territory in 1757 with the palisade marked

The mid-18th century saw a gradual decline of the palisades system. Often, troops only guarded sections near the gates, while away from the gates one could find sections where the willows were gone, and the dikes eroded. In 1745, for example, a government censor (御史; yushi) named He Qizhong reported his concern that illegal migrants and ginseng smugglers may be crossing the palisade all too easily. By the late 18th and early 19th century the migration-control function of the palisade further diminished because of the introduction of legal migration schemes enabling Han civilian peasants to settle on certain Manchu or Mongol lands beyond both the western and eastern sections of the palisade, some of which were sponsored by Manchu and Mongol landlords interested in attracting Han tenant farmers on their properties.

Between 1820 and 1860, the strip of present-day Liaoning province between the easternmost section of the Palisade and the Yalu River was populated with Han settlers as well, eliminating the unpopulated area between the Chinese Empire and the Joseon dynasty.

Thus during the 19th and early 20th century the main significance of the Palisades remained in collecting taxes on the ginseng and other goods that passed through the gates, and regulating cutting of lumber beyond the palisades, although smuggling remained a problem.

As attested by a number of travelers in the region in the first decade of the 20th century, the trenches were mostly gone, and only remainders of the dikes remained, mostly in the western section of the system. According to the Japanese traveler Inaba Iwakichi, who went through Weiyuanbao gate (in the eastern section of the system, near its junction with the other two sections near Kaiyuan) in 1907, and then again several years later through a gate in the Outer Palisade near Shibeiling (south of Changchun), there was nothing for him to see but a few old tree stumps. As he was told by an old gate guard, the willows had been cut by Russian and Japanese troops during the Russo-Japanese War of 1904–05. The remaining gates were falling apart, even if still staffed with tax collectors. The last troops were removed from the gates of the Palisades in 1920.

It was reported that among Banner people, both Manchu and Han in Aihun, Heilongjiang in the 1920s, would seldom marry with Han civilians, but they (Manchu and Han Bannermen) would mostly intermarry with each other. Owen Lattimore reported that during his January 1930 visit to Manchuria, he studied a community in Jilin (Kirin), where both Manchu and Han bannermen were settled at a town called Wulakai, and eventually the Han Bannermen there could not be differentiated from Manchus since they were effectively Manchufied. The Han civilian population was in the process of absorbing and mixing with them when Lattimore wrote his article.

== See also ==
- Chuang Guandong
- Qing dynasty in Inner Asia
- Irish Pale
