= F8 =

F8, F.VIII, F 8, F-8, or F/8 may refer to:

== Aviation ==
- F 8 Barkarby, a former Swedish Air Force wing
- F-8 Crusader, a 1955 American single-engine carrier-based jet fighter aircraft built by Vought
- F-8 Mosquito, the designation for the de Havilland Mosquito in USAAF aerial reconnaissance service
- F8C Falcon, a 1928 American single-engine carrier-based biplane fighter aircraft built by Curtiss
- F8F Bearcat, a 1944 American single-engine carrier-based fighter aircraft built by Grumman
- Fokker F.VIII, a 1927 Dutch large twin-engine airliner
- Freedom Airlines, IATA airline designator
- Kampfgeschwader 40, from its historic Geschwaderkennung code with the Luftwaffe in World War II
- Shenyang F-8, an export version of the Chinese Shenyang J-8 jet interceptor aircraft

== Biology ==
- Factor VIII, a protein
- F8: an EEG electrode site according to the 10-20 system.

== Media ==
- Frequency-8, a record label for electronic music producers Mars & Mystre
- Festival 8, the 8th three-day festival by the rock band Phish, held October 30 – November 1, 2009 in Indio, CA
- The Fate of the Furious (Fast & Furious 8) a.k.a. "F8" (2017 film)
- f/8, a common aperture in photography as exemplified by the photojournalism saying "f/8 and be there"
- F8 (album), the 8th studio album by American heavy metal band Five Finger Death Punch

== Technology ==
- Fairchild F8, a 1977 8-bit microprocessor
- F8, a Function key, on a computer keyboard
- Facebook F8, an annual conference hosted by Facebook

== Vehicles ==
- DKW F8, compact front-wheel drive two-stroke engined saloon, introduced in 1939.
- Ferrari F8, a mid-engined sports car produced by the Italian automobile manufacturer Ferrari
- Italian submarine F8, an Italian Regia Marina (Royal Navy) submarine in commission from 1917 to 1919
- LNER Class F8, a class of British steam locomotives

== Other ==
- F8 (classification), a standing wheelchair disability sport classification
- Cockatoo Island ferry service, a ferry service in Sydney, Australia
- F-8, Islamabad, a sector of Islamabad, Pakistan

== See also ==
- Fate (disambiguation), "fate" sometimes slang spelled as "f8"
- 8F (disambiguation)
