= Fate, Jilin =

Fate A Two waiting County-level city of Shun, China

Fate 法特镇
- Town
- Location in Jilin
- Coordinates: 44°29′1″N 126°31′5″E
- Country: People's Republic of China
- Province: Jilin
- Prefecture-level city: Jilin City
- County-level city: Shulan
- Time zone: UTC+8 (China Standard)

Fate (Chinese: 法特; pinyin: Fǎtè) is a town within the county-level city of Shulan, in the north of Jilin Province in Northeast China. It is located on the right (eastern) bank of the Songhua River, 45 kilometres (28 mi) west of downtown Shulan, and 75 kilometres (47 mi) north of the prefectural capital of Jilin City.

According to the local government, the town occupies 146.98 square kilometres (56.75 sq mi); as of 2003, its population was 38,105, most of which (35,654) is rural population.

It was formerly organised as a township (法特乡).

== Economy ==
Fate Town is primarily agricultural. There are 9,000 hectares of cropland there (5,000 ha dry fields and 4,000 ha rice paddies). Annual production of rice is 38,000 tons, and of maize (corn), 50,000 tons. Fruits (1,000 tons a year) and vegetables are grown as well, and animal husbandry and aquaculture are important.

== History ==
During the Qing dynasty, the so-called Outer Willow Palisade, separating the Mongolian and Manchurian lands to the west and east respectively, ended near Fate.

A local historical site is the so-called "Yellow Fish Circle" (黄鱼圈, Huang Yu Juan; 44°31′N 126°26′E): a large round pool with stone walls constructed during the Qing dynasty, and used to store live sturgeon (the Amur sturgeon and Kaluga sturgeon), considered a delicacy by the Manchu Qing Emperors. The fish, caught in the Sungari River in the spring and summer, was kept in the pool until winter, when it became possible to ship it, frozen, to the imperial court in Beijing without being spoiled on the way. The pool has been described as being 500 m in circumference and over a zhang (around 3.3 m) deep; other sources claimed somewhat greater sizes, some 50,000-60,000 square meters in area and 5 meters deep.

The present name of the site, 黄鱼圈 (Huángyú juān, literally "Yellow Fish Circle"), is said to be a corruption of the original homophonic 鳇鱼圈 (Huángyú juān, Kaluga sturgeon Circle).
