= Sisters of Fate =

Sisters of Fate may refer to:

- Sisters of Fate (God of War), video-game characters based on Greek mythology
- The Merry Sisters of Fate, a Lúnasa album
- Fates, mythological beings often depicted as sisters
