= Future Affordable Turbine Engine =

- Type: turboshaft/turboprop
- Manufacturer: GE Aviation
- Major applications: US Army Future Vertical Lift

The Future Affordable Turbine Engine (FATE) is a US Army program for a 5,000-10,000-shp class turboshaft/turboprop for Future Vertical Lift aircraft and its Joint Multi Role precursor.

== Design ==
To extend range and endurance and to increase hot-and-high payload and performance, it should reduce BSFC by 35%, reduce production/maintenance costs by 45%, improve power-to-weight by 80% and design life by 20% to more than 6,000 hours.

== Development ==
In November 2011, GE was selected for $45 million over five years, to develop technologies including advanced aerodynamics, cooling configurations and improved materials; and rig tests to validate innovative components, leading up to a full system demonstration.

In 2017, following the successful tests of the engine’s compressor with the highest single-spool pressure ratio recorded, combustor with GE's most extensive use of CMCs allowing unprecedented high-temperature capability and weight reduction, and turbine rig tests, the first assembled engine completed testing after running 40 hours, reaching the program goals, before a second prototype began testing in 2018.

== See also ==
- Adaptive Versatile Engine Technology (ADVENT)
- Improved Turbine Engine Program
- List of aircraft engines

Comparable engines

- Lycoming T55 (Boeing CH-47 Chinook)
- Rolls-Royce T406 (Bell Boeing V-22 Osprey)
- General Electric GE38/T408 (Sikorsky CH-53K)
