= Bhagavad-gita Museum =

- Established: 1977
- Location: 3764 Watseka Ave., Los Angeles, California
- Coordinates: 34.025332°N 118.397112°W
- Type: Art museum
- Owner: International Society for Krishna Consciousness
- Website: bgmuseum.com

The Bhagavad-gita Museum, officially the Diorama-museum of Bhagavad-gita, also known as the First American Transcendental Exhibition (FATE), is a multimedia art museum located in West Los Angeles, California. Established in 1977, it is dedicated to illustrating the philosophy of Bhagavad-gita and is owned and operated by the International Society for Krishna Consciousness (ISKCON).

== History ==
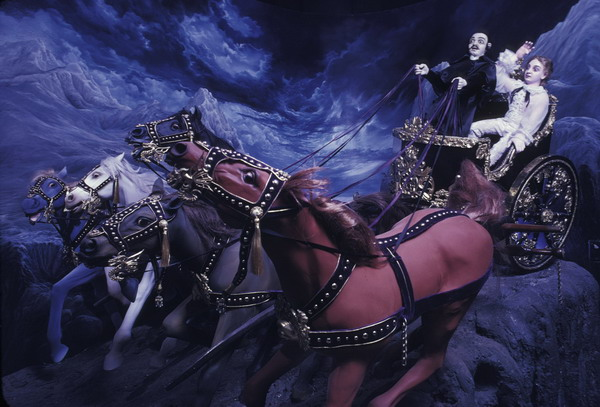
"The Precarious Condition of the Living Entity" diorama

The Bhagavad-gita Museum was inspired by a diorama exhibit developed by Bhaktisiddhanta Sarasvati in the mid 1930s, consisting of dozens of dioramas dedicated to the philosophy of Krishna consciousness. In 1973 Sarasvati's student A. C. Bhaktivedanta Swami Prabhupada, the founder of the International Society for Krishna Consciousness (ISKCON), also known as the Hare Krishna movement, sent a group of disciples from the New York temple to Mayapur, India, to study the art of diorama doll making. After fifteen months of studying, the team returned and doll-making at the Los Angeles site began, the museum finally opening in 1977. The museum is located in West Los Angeles near the border of Culver City, where a sizable Hare Krishna population resides.

For the time, the museum was quite sophisticated: a computer was specially designed to synchronize the exhibition which included lighting, a 16-track sound system, numerous film and slide projectors, and special visual effects. New industrial grade projectors and new lighting effects were installed in 1984. However, this sophistication came at a price, and the exhibit was plagued by computer glitches and maintenance problems falling into significant disrepair by 1995. Starting in 1999 the museum was refurbished, and was reopened in 2001 with modern solid state show controls. Further renovations were made in the 2010s and the museum was reopened in 2016.

== Exhibits ==
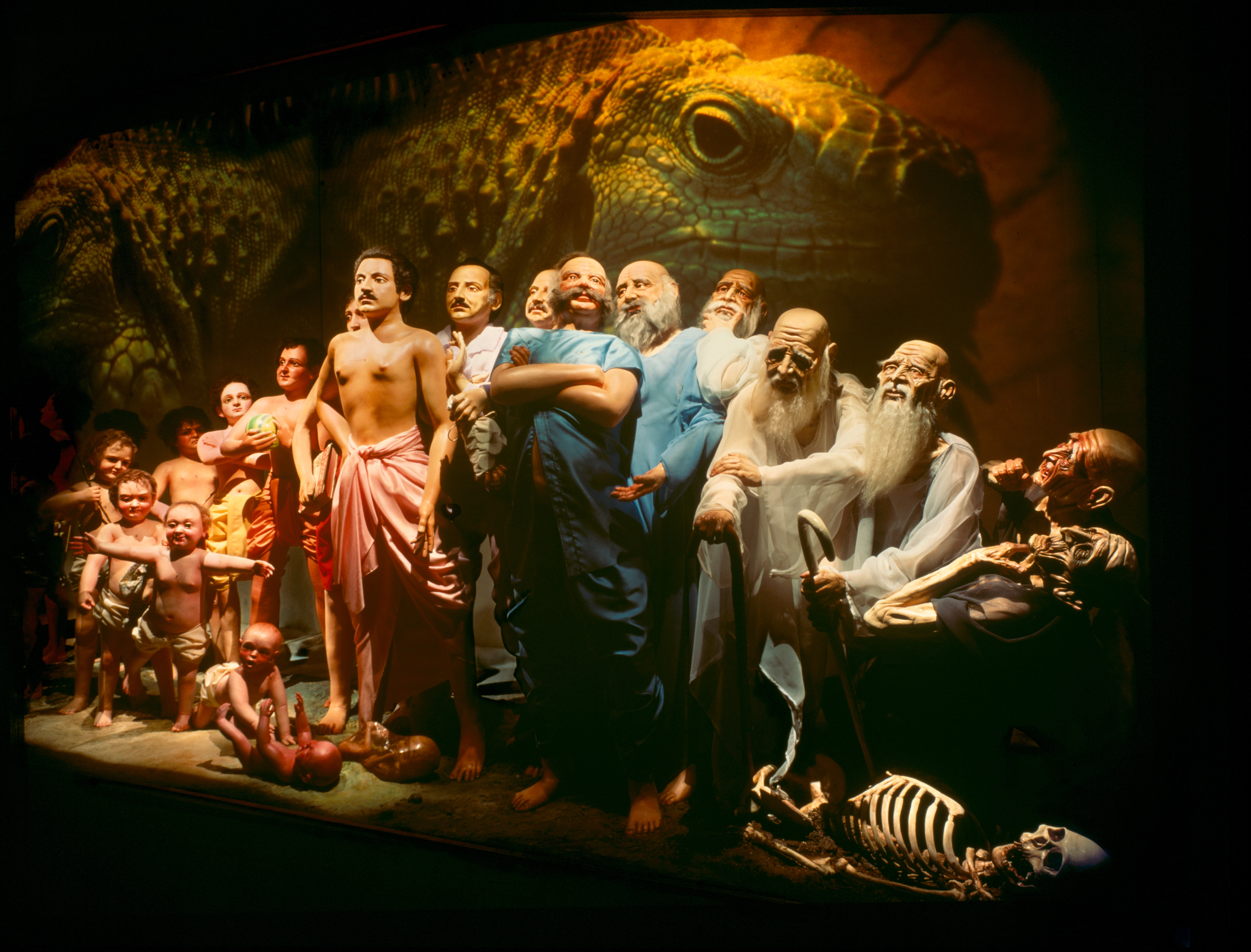
"Changing Bodies" diorama

The exhibit consists of eleven dioramas. The almost life-sized dolls in the dioramas are constructed from traditional Indian doll-making materials such as bamboo, rice straw, various clays, and rice husk, using traditional construction, finishing, and dressing techniques. While the display was refurbished over the years, it was not modernized. The dioramas are:

- "Introduction — Prabhupada and the Bhagavad-gita"
- "Setting the Stage"
- "Changing Bodies"
- "The Precarious Condition of the Living Entity"
- "Choices on the Path of Life"
- "Equal Vision of the Sages"
- "Krishna's Transcendental Manifestations"
- "God's Universal Form"
- "The Ocean of Birth and Death"
- "Lord Chaitanya's Sankirtan Festival"
- "Goloka — The Spiritual Realm"

== Other amenities ==
The museum is adjacent to a restaurant serving vegetarian cuisine, and has a gift shop.

== Reception ==
In 1977, the year of its opening, the museum received media attention due to a photograph by Eddie Adams of the "Changing Bodies" exhibit, which he photographed at Topanga Canyon against the backdrop of the Santa Monica Mountains. The picture appeared in more than a hundred newspapers and was featured in Associated Press' Yearbook 1977. It was selected by the National Press Photographers Association and Popular Photography for the 1978 American Photographic Artists (APA) International Exhibition of Photography.

The museum was featured by LA Weekly in 2011 as one of the "Best of L.A. Arts & Entertainment" and in 2012 as one of "10 Oddball L.A. Museums Worth Seeing". In 2013 Deb Flomberg of CBS Los Angeles described it as "fascinating and educational" and "an important way to learn a lot about this greatly misunderstood religion". Atlas Obscura featured the museum on Obscura Day 2015. In 2017 CBS Los Angeles featured the museum in "Best Museums For Dates In Los Angeles" and called it "an exotic step into the world of the Hare Krishna".
