= List of Chinese films of 2024 =

The following is a list of mainland Chinese films first released in year 2024.

== Box office ==
The highest-grossing Chinese films released in 2024, by domestic box office gross revenue, are as follows:

| Rank | Title | Domestic gross |
|---|---|---|
| 1 | YOLO | CN¥3.42 billion ($475.17 million) |
| 2 | Pegasus 2 | CN¥3.36 billion ($466.83 million) |
| 3 | Successor | CN¥3.33 billion ($462.66 million) |
| 4 | Article 20 | CN¥2.43 billion ($337.62 million) |
| 5 | Boonie Bears: Time Twist | CN¥1.98 billion ($275.1 million) |
| 6 | A Place Called Silence | CN¥1.35 billion ($187.57 million) |
| 7 | The Volunteers: The Battle of Life and Death | CN¥1.21 billion ($168.11 million) |
| 8 | Octopus with Broken Arms | CN¥933 million ($129.63 million) |
| 9 | The Last Frenzy | CN¥781 million ($108.51 million) |
| 10 | Big World | CN¥766 million ($106.43 million) |

== Released ==
=== January–March ===
| Opening | | Title | Director(s) | Cast | Genre | Ref. |
|---|---|---|---|---|---|---|
| J A N U A R Y | 6 | The Monkey King: Heaven's Great Mission | Yuzhou Zhitie | Su Shangqing, Ye Zhiqiu, Gao Zengzhi, Bai Ma | Fantasy | |
| J A N U A R Y | 11 | Kong and Jigme | Chen Guoxing, La Huajia | Song Yang, Jin Ba, Tao Hai, Suolang Wangmu | Drama | |
| J A N U A R Y | 12 | Follow Bear to Adventure | An Xiaoman | Bao Bei'er, Song Xiaofeng, Pan Binlong, Jia Bing, Wei Xiang | Comedy | |
| J A N U A R Y | 12 | Night Falls | Jian Haodong | Ji Liang, Fei Zuo | Drama | |
| J A N U A R Y | 12 | The Storm | Yang Zhigang | Chen Hao, Xing Lin'er | Drama | |
| J A N U A R Y | 13 | This Is Life | Sun Hong | | Documentary | |
| J A N U A R Y | 19 | Tonghua Girl | Feng Shengjie | Tian Bo, Liang Mengyi, Quan Liqun, Zhu Rui, Gao Haoquan | Romantic comedy | |
| J A N U A R Y | 20 | Dance with the Finless Porpoise | Chen Xi, Chen Weijian | Cai Haiting, Gu Jiangshan, Nie Xiying, Sun Lulu, Wei Chao | Fantasy | |
| J A N U A R Y | 20 | The Journey of Flower | Charlie Zhang | Chen Duling, Toby Lee, Mao Zijun, Lai Meiyun, Zhang Zining | Romantic fantasy | |
| J A N U A R Y | 26 | Give Me a Ride | Fan Chao, Chen Yizi | Bao Bei'er, Li Meng, Yang Haoyu, He Landou, Yu Yang | Crime comedy | |
| F E B R U A R Y | 10 | Article 20 | Zhang Yimou | Lei Jiayin, Ma Li, Zhao Liying, Chloe, Liu Yaowen | Comedy-drama | |
| F E B R U A R Y | 10 | Ba Jie | He Ranhao | Zhang Lei, Ji Guanlin, Zhao Mingzhou, Gao Zengzhi, Ma Dehua | Fantasy | |
| F E B R U A R Y | 10 | Boonie Bears: Time Twist | Lin Huida | Tan Xiao, Zhang Wei, Zhang Bingjun | Science fiction comedy | |
| F E B R U A R Y | 10 | Huang Pi: God of Money | Bai Ding and Guan Yang | Li Meng, Yan Nan, Wang Zi, Yang Tianxiang, Liu Yike | Comedy | |
| F E B R U A R Y | 10 | Pegasus 2 | Han Han | Shen Teng, Fan Chengcheng, Yin Zheng, Zhang Benyu, Sun Yizhou | Sports comedy drama | |
| F E B R U A R Y | 10 | YOLO | Jia Ling | Jia Ling, Lei Jiayin, Li Xueqin, Zhang Xiaofei, Qiao Shan | Comedy-drama | |
| F E B R U A R Y | 16 | Break War | Danny Pang Phat | Francis Ng, Simon Yam, Cheng Yuanyuan, Michael Tong | Action | |
| M A R C H | 15 | The Movie Emperor | Ning Hao | Andy Lau, Rima Zeidan, Pal Sinn, Kelly Lin, Ning Hao | Satire | |
| M A R C H | 30 | Viva La Vida | Han Yan | Peng Yuchang, Li Gengxi | Romantic drama | |

=== April–June ===
| Opening | | Title | Director(s) | Cast | Genre | Ref. |
|---|---|---|---|---|---|---|
| A P R I L | 3 | Dwelling by the West Lake | Gu Xiaogang | Leo Wu, Jiang Qinqin, Chen Jianbin, Wang Jiajia | Drama | |
| A P R I L | 3 | Snow Leopard | Pema Tseden | Jinpa, Xiong Ziqi | Drama | |
| A P R I L | 12 | Woof Woof Daddy | Lu Ke | Aaron Kwok, Lan Yingying | Fantasy comedy | |
| M A Y | 1 | Formed Police Unit | Tat-Chiu Lee | Huang Jingyu, Wang Yibo, Zhong Chuxi | Action | |
| M A Y | 1 | Nothing Can't Be Undone by a HotPot | Ding Sheng | Yang Mi, Yu Qian, Tian Yu, Yu Ailei, Li Jiuxiao | Crime comedy | |
| M A Y | 1 | I Love You to the Moon and Back | Li Weiran | Zhang Zifeng, Hu Xianxu | Romantic drama | |
| M A Y | 17 | Strangers When We Meet | Zhang Guoli | Fan Wei, Zhou Dongyu | Crime drama | |
| M A Y | 24 | Three Old Boys | Gao Qunshu | Huang Zhizhong, Jiang Wu, Guo Tao | Crime | |
| J U N E | 8 | G for Gap | Long Fei | Hu Ge, Gao Yuanyuan | Comedy drama | |
| J U N E | 15 | Black Dog | Guan Hu | Eddie Peng, Tong Liya | Drama | |
| J U N E | 22 | Moments We Shared | Zhang Jiajia | Peng Yuchang, Zhou Ye, Ai Liya, Chen Xianen | Drama | |
| J U N E | 28 | Life Hotel | Bowen Liu | Huang Xuan, Liu Yan, Liu Yang, Zhang Zhehua, Dong Bao Shi | Romantic drama | |

=== July–September ===
| Opening | | Title | Director(s) | Cast | Genre | Ref. |
|---|---|---|---|---|---|---|
| J U L Y | 3 | A Place Called Silence | Sam Quah | Wang Chuanjun, Ning Chang, Francis Ng | Crime thriller | |
| J U L Y | 5 | Welcome to My Side | Song Haolin | Yu Shi, Wang Yinglu | Romantic comedy | |
| J U L Y | 10 | A Legend | Stanley Tong | Jackie Chan, Lay Zhang, Gülnezer, Aarif Rahman | Action fantasy | |
| J U L Y | 16 | Successor | Yan Fei, Peng Damo | Shen Teng, Ma Li | Comedy drama | |
| A U G U S T | 2 | Escape from the 21st Century | Li Yang | Zhang Ruoyun, Zhong Chuxi, Song Yang, Wu Xiaoliang | Science fiction comedy | |
| A U G U S T | 3 | Decoded | Chen Sicheng | Liu Haoran, John Cusack, Chen Daoming, Daniel Wu | Period drama | |
| A U G U S T | 9 | Upstream | Xu Zheng | Xu Zheng, Xin Zhilei | Drama | |
| A U G U S T | 10 | Land of Broken Hearts | Shipei Wen | Zhu Yilong, Qiu Tian, Jiang Qiming, Zhu Zhu | Romantic drama | |
| A U G U S T | 23 | The Hedgehog | Gu Changwei | Ge You, Wang Junkai | Drama | |
| S E P T E M B E R | 6 | The Sinking of the Lisbon Maru | Fang Li | Brian Finch, Tony Banham, Lin Agen, Dennis Morley, William Beningfield | Documentary | |
| S E P T E M B E R | 13 | Stand by Me | Yin Ruoxi | Wang Junkai, Deng Jiajia, Chen Yongsheng, Pan Binlong | Drama | |
| S E P T E M B E R | 15 | Like a Rolling Stone | Yin Lichuan | Yong Mei, Jiang Wu, Janice Wu, Zhang Benyu, Ma Su, Ai Liya, Li Yixiang | Drama | |
| S E P T E M B E R | 30 | High Forces | Oxide Pang | Andy Lau, Zhang Zifeng, Qu Chuxiao | Action | |
| S E P T E M B E R | 30 | The Volunteers: The Battle of Life and Death | Chen Kaige | Zhu Yilong, Xin Baiqing, Zhang Zifeng | War drama | |

=== October–December ===
| Opening | | Title | Director(s) | Cast | Genre | Ref. |
|---|---|---|---|---|---|---|
| O C T O B E R | 1 | Bureau 749 | Lu Chuan | Wang Junkai, Miao Miao, Zheng Kai, Ren Min, Xin Baiqing, Li Chen, Ning Chang, Li Meng | Science fiction adventure | |
| O C T O B E R | 1 | Tiger Wolf Rabbit | Shubo Guo | Xiao Yang, Zhao Liying, Liu Ye | Crime drama | |
| O C T O B E R | 1 | The Hutong Cowboy | Ning Hao | Ge You, Li Xueqin, Yang Haoyu | Comedy | |
| O C T O B E R | 1 | Panda Plan | Luan Zhang | Jackie Chan, Xiang Wei, Ce Shi, Yanbo Han | Action comedy | |
| O C T O B E R | 26 | The Unseen Sister | Midi Z | Zhao Liying, Xin Zhilei, Huang Jue | Drama | |
| N O V E M B E R | 15 | To Gather Around | Xunzimo Liu | Deng Chao, Deng Jiajia, Zheng Yunlong, Yu Entai, Zhang Benyu, Ke Da, Li Naiwen, Yang Haoyu | Drama | |
| N O V E M B E R | 22 | Her Story | Shao Yihui | Song Jia, Zhong Chuxi, Zeng Mumei, Zhang Yu | Comedy drama | |
| N O V E M B E R | 22 | Caught by the Tides | Jia Zhangke | Zhao Tao | Drama | |
| D E C E M B E R | 14 | I Am What I Am 2 | Sun Haipeng | Li Xin, Chen Yexiong, Guo Hao | Animated | |
| D E C E M B E R | 27 | Big World | Yang Lina | Jackson Yee, Diana Lin, Jiang Qinqin, Zhou Yutong, Li Gengyou | Drama | |
| D E C E M B E R | 28 | Octopus with Broken Arms | Gan Jianyu | Xiao Yang, Tong Liya, Duan Yihong, Cya Liu | Crime thriller | |

== See also ==
- List of Chinese films of 2023
- List of Chinese films of 2025
