= List of films released in IMAX (2020s) =

Films released in IMAX in the 2020s

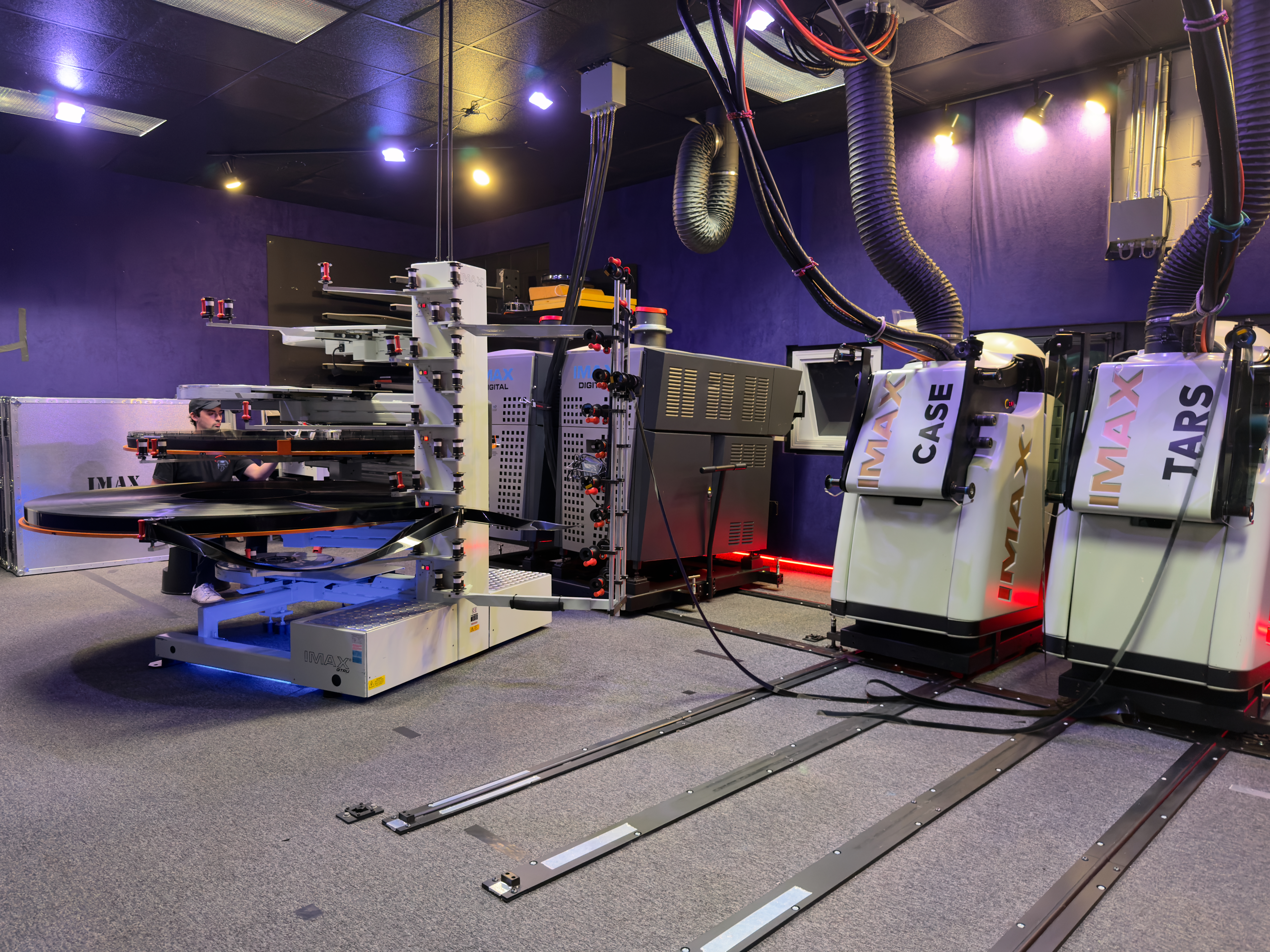
IMAX 70mm and digital projection systems

This is a list of films released in IMAX in the 2020s, a motion-picture film format and projection standard. IMAX cameras and film stock are rarely used for mainstream films; the cameras are heavy and the film stock is expensive. However, since 2002, some feature films shot with IMAX digital cameras or on original 35mm film stock have undergone IMAX Digital Media Remastering (DMR) processing for showing both in 70mm IMAX theaters and in IMAX Digital theaters.

Several animated titles (Fantasia 2000, Beauty and the Beast, Treasure Planet, The Lion King, Falling in Love Again, CyberWorld, Fly Me to the Moon 3D, and Santa vs. the Snowman 3D) were released in IMAX 70mm prints; however, they were not subject to DMR processing. Academy Award-winning cinematographer Roger Deakins supervised custom transfers for Skyfall, Blade Runner 2049, and 1917 rather than using IMAX's DMR process.

This list includes the films that have been released in IMAX theaters. Films that were presented in IMAX theaters using either 35mm or digital prints, but were never specifically mastered for IMAX, are not included.

As of August 11, 2026, The Odyssey (2026) is the highest-grossing IMAX release of all time, grossing over $289 million from IMAX screens. The previous record holder was Avatar (2009), which grossed over $271 million.

== 2020 ==
Name	Release date	Format			Notes
Name	Release date	70mm	Digital	Laser	Notes
Invasion	1 January 2020	No	Yes	Yes	Russia only.
1917	10 January 2020	No	Yes	Yes	Limited engagement. Aspect ratio opened up to 1.90:1 for the entire film. The DMR process was not used for the film; instead, a custom transfer was made. Opened in select IMAX theaters in North America on 10 January 2020 before expanding nationwide on 24 January 2020.
Bad Boys for Life	17 January 2020	No	Yes	Yes	Released in an IMAX Enhanced version on 4K Blu-ray on 21 April 2020. Preserved on home media for IMAX Enhanced on Sony Pictures Core.
Dolittle	17 January 2020	No	Yes	Yes	Released in 2D in North America and selected territories. Released in 3D (conversion) in other territories.
Cats	24 January 2020	No	Yes	Yes	Japan only.
Birds of Prey (and the Fantabulous Emancipation of One Harley Quinn)	7 February 2020	No	Yes	Yes	An exclusive 5-minute prologue preview of Tenet was attached at select IMAX theaters.
Parasite	21 February 2020	No	Yes	Yes	Re-released in IMAX theaters. Selected territories only. Limited engagement.
The Invisible Man	28 February 2020	No	Yes	Yes	
Onward	6 March 2020	No	Yes	Yes	Released in 2D in most territories. Released in 3D in China. Preceded by the short film Playdate with Destiny.
Bloodshot	13 March 2020	No	Yes	Yes	Preserved on home media for IMAX Enhanced on Sony Pictures Core.
I Still Believe	13 March 2020	No	Yes	Yes	Selected territories only. Released early for a one-night engagement on 11 March 2020.
Trolls World Tour	19 March 2020	No	Yes	Yes	Russia only. Limited engagement.
Akira	3 April 2020	No	Yes	Yes	Originally released in 1988. Selected territories only.
Peninsula	15 July 2020	No	Yes	Yes	South Korea and selected territories only. Released in Canada on 19 August and in the US on 21 August.
Muse – Simulation Theory: The IMAX Experience	17 August 2020	No	Yes	Yes	The US, Canada, UK, France, The Netherlands, Denmark, Sweden, Finland, Mongolia, Norway, and Germany in select theaters. Limited engagement.
The Eight Hundred	21 August 2020	No	Yes	Yes	First Chinese feature film to be entirely filmed with IMAX Arri Alexa cameras. China only. Released in UK for a limited one-week engagement on 16 September 2020. Released in Hong Kong on 29 October 2020. Released for a limited one-week engagement in Middle East on 19 November 2020. Released for a limited engagement in South Korea on 10 December 2020. Released for a limited one-week engagement in Russia on 3 May 2021.
Tenet	26 August 2020	Yes	Yes	Yes	75 minutes shot with IMAX 65mm cameras. Presented in an expanded 1.43:1 aspect ratio for IMAX GT venues with 70mm Film & Dual Laser, and 1.90:1 for IMAX Digital and IMAX Laser. Home-Media (excl Streaming) retained the expanded Aspect Ratio in a cropped 1.78:1 (16:9) for IMAX scenes. The IMAX 70mm version debuted in ten theaters globally. The pre-show included a special version of the IMAX countdown.
The New Mutants	28 August 2020	No	Yes	Yes	Selected territories only.
Mulan	11 September 2020	No	Yes	Yes	Released in 3D (conversion) in China, Cambodia, and Thailand. Released in 2D in selected territories.
Streltsov	24 September 2020	No	Yes	Yes	Russia only.
Leap	25 September 2020	No	Yes	Yes	China only.
Vanguard	30 September 2020	No	Yes	Yes	In 3D (conversion). China only.
Asteroid Hunters	1 October 2020	No	Yes	Yes	In 3D (conversion) and 2D.
Jiang Ziya: Legend of Deification	1 October 2020	No	Yes	Yes	In 3D. China only.
My People, My Homeland	1 October 2020	No	Yes	Yes	China only.
Honest Thief	8 October 2020	No	Yes	Yes	
Demon Slayer: Kimetsu no Yaiba the Movie: Mugen Train	16 October 2020	No	Yes	Yes	Japan and selected territories only. Released IMAX in Taiwan on 6 November 2020. Released IMAX in Hong Kong on 19 November 2020. Released IMAX in Thailand on 3 December 2020. Released IMAX in Singapore for a limited one-week engagement on 10 December 2020. Released in North America on 22 April 2021.
Sacrifice	23 October 2020	No	Yes	Yes	China only.
Stand by Me Doraemon 2	20 November 2020	No	Yes	Yes	Japan and Indonesia only.
The Croods: A New Age	25 November 2020	No	Yes	Yes	Released in 2D in North America and selected territories. Released in 3D in China.
Monster Hunter	3 December 2020	No	Yes	Yes	Released in 2D in North America and selected territories. Released in 3D (conversion) in China, The Netherlands and Japan. Preserved on home media for IMAX Enhanced on Sony Pictures Core.
Soul Snatcher	4 December 2020	No	Yes	Yes	China only.
The Silver Skates	10 December 2020	No	Yes	Yes	Russia only.
Wonder Woman 1984	16 December 2020	No	Yes	Yes	Released in 2D in North America. Released in 3D (conversion) in selected territories. 15 minutes shot with IMAX 65mm cameras in select scenes opened up to a 1.90:1 aspect ratio. Released in the US on 25 December simultaneously in theaters and on HBO Max.
The Rescue	18 December 2020	No	Yes	Yes	China only. Aspect ratio opened up to 1.90:1 for the entire film.
Fire	24 December 2020	No	Yes	Yes	Russia only.
Shock Wave 2	24 December 2020	No	Yes	Yes	China and Hong Kong only. Released for a limited one-week engagement in Middle East on 4 February 2021.
Soul	25 December 2020	No	Yes	Yes	In 3D. China only.

== 2021 ==
Name	Release date	Format			Notes
Name	Release date	70mm	Digital	Laser	Notes
Evangelion: 3.333 You Can (Not) Redo	8 January 2021	No	Yes	Yes	Originally released in 2012. Japan only.
Wish Dragon	15 January 2021	No	Yes	Yes	China and selected territories.
Apollo 11: Quarantine	29 January 2021	No	Yes	Yes	
Nomadland	29 January 2021	No	Yes	Yes	Selected territories only. Aspect ratio opened up to 1.90:1 for the entire film.
The Lord of the Rings: The Fellowship of the Ring	5 February 2021	No	Yes	Yes	Originally released in 2001.
Music	10 February 2021	No	Yes	Yes	Selected territories only. One-night-only engagement.
The Lord of the Rings: The Two Towers	12 February 2021	No	Yes	Yes	Originally released in 2002.
The Lord of the Rings: The Return of the King	12 February 2021	No	Yes	Yes	Originally released in 2003. First IMAX DMR film to surpass 200 minutes.
A Writer's Odyssey	12 February 2021	No	Yes	Yes	In 3D (conversion). China and Australia only. Aspect ratio opened up to 1.90:1 for the entire film.
Detective Chinatown 3	12 February 2021	No	Yes	Yes	China only. Filmed partially with Arri Alexa IMAX cameras.
New Gods: Nezha Reborn	12 February 2021	No	Yes	Yes	In 3D. China and Australia only.
Billie Eilish: The World's a Little Blurry	26 February 2021	No	Yes	Yes	Limited engagement.
Chaos Walking	5 March 2021	No	Yes	Yes	
Raya and the Last Dragon	5 March 2021	No	Yes	Yes	Released in 2D in North America. Released in 3D in other territories. Preceded by the short film Us Again. Released simultaneously in theaters and on Disney+ with Premier Access.
Evangelion: 3.0+1.0 Thrice Upon a Time	8 March 2021	No	Yes	Yes	First theatrical release in Japan in 2021. Limited IMAX run in Thailand on 13–19 October 2022. One-night U.S. IMAX release on 30 November 2022.
Godzilla vs. Kong	24 March 2021	No	Yes	Yes	Released in 2D in North America. Released in 3D (conversion) in other territories. Released in the US on 31 March simultaneously in theaters and on HBO Max.
Detective Conan: The Scarlet Bullet	16 April 2021	No	Yes	Yes	Japan only.
Mortal Kombat	23 April 2021	No	Yes	Yes	Released simultaneously in theaters and on HBO Max.
Rurouni Kenshin: The Final	23 April 2021	No	Yes	Yes	Japan only.
Cliff Walkers	30 April 2021	No	Yes	Yes	China only.
Home Sweet Home	1 May 2021	No	Yes	Yes	China only.
Wrath of Man	7 May 2021	No	Yes	Yes	
Spiral: From the Book of Saw	14 May 2021	No	Yes	Yes	
218: Behind the Wall of Silence	20 May 2021	No	Yes	Yes	First IMAX DMR Emirati release. United Arab Emirates only.
A Quiet Place Part II	28 May 2021	No	Yes	Yes	
The Conjuring: The Devil Made Me Do It	4 June 2021	No	Yes	Yes	Released simultaneously in theaters and on HBO Max.
Rurouni Kenshin: The Beginning	4 June 2021	No	Yes	Yes	Japan only.
In the Heights	10 June 2021	No	Yes	Yes	Released simultaneously in theaters and on HBO Max. Screened early for a one-night engagement on Mother's Day 2021. An exclusive sneak peek at the making of Olivia Rodrigo's Sour was attached.
Are You Lonesome Tonight?	12 June 2021	No	Yes	Yes	China only.
Hitman's Wife's Bodyguard	16 June 2021	No	Yes	Yes	
F9	25 June 2021	No	Yes	Yes	Released in 2D in North America and most territories. Released in 3D (conversion) in selected territories on 19 May 2021. An exclusive 5-minute prologue preview of Jurassic World Dominion was attached and was shown in the expanded aspect ratio of 1.90:1.
The Pioneer	1 July 2021	No	Yes	Yes	China only.
1921	1 July 2021	No	Yes	Yes	China only.
Black Widow	9 July 2021	No	Yes	Yes	Released in 2D in select territories. Released in 3D (conversion) in other territories. Aspect ratio opened up to 1.90:1 for 20 minutes of the film and preserved on home media for Blu-ray 3D (in Japan) & IMAX Enhanced on Disney+. Released simultaneously in theaters and on Disney+ with Premier Access.
Chinese Doctors	9 July 2021	No	Yes	Yes	China only.
Belle	16 July 2021	No	Yes	Yes	Released in the United States on 12 January 2022.
Snake Eyes	23 July 2021	No	Yes	Yes	
White Snake 2: The tribulation of Green Snake	23 July 2021	No	Yes	Yes	China only.
Escape from Mogadishu	28 July 2021	No	Yes	Yes	South Korea only.
Jungle Cruise	30 July 2021	No	Yes	Yes	Released in 2D in select territories. Released in 3D (conversion) in other territories. Released simultaneously in theaters and on Disney+ with Premier Access.
Raging Fire	30 July 2021	No	Yes	Yes	China only.
The Suicide Squad	6 August 2021	No	Yes	Yes	Filmed entirely with IMAX-certified Red Ranger Monstro and Komodo cameras. Released simultaneously in theaters and on HBO Max.
Free Guy	13 August 2021	No	Yes	Yes	Released in 2D in North America. Released in 3D (conversion) in select territories.
Mountain Adventure: Out of Bounds	19 August 2021	Yes	No	No	In 3D (conversion). Australia only.
Reminiscence	20 August 2021	No	Yes	Yes	Released simultaneously in theaters and on HBO Max.
If I Can't Have Love, I Want Power	25 August 2021	No	Yes	No	Selected territories only. Filmed with IMAX Arri Alexa cameras. One-night-only engagement.
Shang-Chi and the Legend of the Ten Rings	3 September 2021	No	Yes	Yes	Released in 2D in North America and select territories. Released in 3D (conversion) in other territories. Filmed entirely with IMAX-certified Arri Alexa LF and Arri Alexa Mini LF cameras. Aspect ratio opened up to 1.90:1 for the entire film and preserved on home media for IMAX Enhanced on Disney+.
Dune	16 September 2021	No	Yes	Yes	Released in 2D in North America and select territories. Released in 3D (conversion) in other territories. Filmed entirely with IMAX-certified Arri Alexa LF and Arri Alexa Mini LF. Expanded 1.43:1 aspect ratio at IMAX GT Laser Venues, and 1.90:1 aspect ratio at IMAX Laser and IMAX Digital Venues with 60 minutes of expanded footage. 29 "mega frame" shots expanded horizontally from IMAX to 2.39:1 and shrunk for standard; at least one shot reframed for 2.39:1. Debuted at the Toronto International Film Festival in IMAX at the Ontario Place Cinesphere on 11 September 2021. Released in the US on 22 October simultaneously in theaters and on HBO Max. Re-released in IMAX on 3 December.
Ghost in the Shell (1995)	17 September 2021	No	Yes	Yes	Originally released in 1995. Selected territories only.
Cloudy Mountain	17 September 2021	No	Yes	Yes	China only.
Dear Evan Hansen	24 September 2021	No	Yes	Yes	
No Time to Die	30 September 2021	No	Yes	Yes	Released in 2D in North America and select territories. Released in 3D (conversion) in other territories. 30 minutes shot with IMAX 65mm cameras. Expanded aspect ratio of 1.43:1 (30 minutes) and 1.90:1 (10 minutes) at IMAX GT Laser Venues; 1.90:1 (40 minutes) for IMAX Laser & Digital Venues. Re-released in IMAX on 21 January 2022.
My Country, My Parents	30 September 2021	No	Yes	Yes	China only.
The Battle at Lake Changjin	30 September 2021	No	Yes	Yes	Filmed entirely with IMAX-certified Red Ranger Monstro cameras. China only.
Waterboys	30 September 2021	No	Yes	Yes	China only.
Venom: Let There Be Carnage	1 October 2021	No	Yes	Yes	Released in 2D in select territories. Released in 3D (conversion) in other territories. Preserved on home media for IMAX Enhanced on Sony Pictures Core.
Sword Art Online Progressive: Aria of a Starless Night	30 October 2021	No	Yes	Yes	
Eternals	5 November 2021	No	Yes	Yes	Released in 2D in North America and select territories. Released in 3D (conversion) in other territories. Filmed entirely with IMAX-certified Arri Alexa LF and Arri Alexa Mini LF cameras. Expanded aspect ratio of 1.43:1 (7 minutes) and 1.90:1 (67 minutes) at IMAX GT Laser Venues; 1.90:1 (74 minutes) for IMAX Laser & Digital Venues. Home-Media retained the expanded Aspect Ratio in both 1.90:1 and 1.78:1 (16:9) for IMAX scenes in IMAX Enhanced on Disney+.
Ghostbusters: Afterlife	19 November 2021	No	Yes	Yes	Preserved on home media for IMAX Enhanced on Sony Pictures Core.
Railway Heroes	19 November 2021	No	Yes	Yes	China only.
Resident Evil: Welcome to Raccoon City	2 December 2021	No	Yes	Yes	Selected territories only. Preserved on home media for IMAX Enhanced on Sony Pictures Core.
The Tragedy of Macbeth	5 December 2021	No	Yes	Yes	One-day-only engagement. Re-released for a second one-day engagement on 26 January 2022.
The Matrix	7 December 2021	No	Yes	Yes	Originally released in 1999.
Kanye with Special Guest Drake - Free Larry Hoover Benefit Concert	9 December 2021	No	Yes	Yes	Livestream event. Selected territories only. Filmed with Arri Alexa IMAX cameras. One-night-only engagement.
West Side Story	10 December 2021	No	Yes	Yes	
Elf	13 December 2021	No	Yes	Yes	Selected territories only. One-night-only engagement. Originally released in 2003.
Spider-Man: No Way Home	17 December 2021	No	Yes	Yes	Released in 2D in North America and select territories. Released in 3D (conversion) in other territories. Aspect ratio opened up to 1.90:1 for the entire film and preserved on home media for IMAX Enhanced on Sony Pictures Core and Disney+.
Fireflies in the Sun	17 December 2021	No	Yes	Yes	China only.
The Matrix Resurrections	22 December 2021	No	Yes	Yes	Released simultaneously in theaters and on HBO Max.
The King's Man	22 December 2021	No	Yes	Yes	Selected territories only.
Gekijō-ban Jujutsu Kaisen 0	24 December 2021	No	Yes	Yes	Released in the United States on 18 March 2022 as one-night-only engagement. Released in the Philippines on 22 June 2022.
The Last Warrior: A Messenger of Darkness	30 December 2021	No	Yes	Yes	Russia and CIS only.
Embrace Again	31 December 2021	No	Yes	Yes	China only.

== 2022 ==
Name	Release date	Format			Notes
Name	Release date	70mm	Digital	Laser	Notes
The Pirates: The Last Royal Treasure	26 January 2022	No	Yes	Yes	South Korea only.
The Beatles: Get Back – The Rooftop Concert	30 January 2022	No	Yes	Yes	One-day-only engagement with a live-streamed Q&A. Re-released between 9 and 13 February without the Q&A for the worldwide release.
The Battle at Lake Changjin II	1 February 2022	No	Yes	Yes	Filmed entirely with IMAX-certified digital cameras. China only.
Nice View	1 February 2022	No	Yes	Yes	China only.
Only Fools Rush In	1 February 2022	No	Yes	Yes	China only.
Moonfall	4 February 2022	No	Yes	Yes	
Death on the Nile	11 February 2022	No	Yes	Yes	
Uncharted	18 February 2022	No	Yes	Yes	Aspect ratio opened up to 1.90:1 for 20 minutes and preserved on home media for IMAX Enhanced on Sony Pictures Core.
Donda Experience Performance	22 February 2022	No	Yes	Yes	Livestream Event. One-night-only engagement. Selected territories only.
The Batman	4 March 2022	No	Yes	Yes	
Notre-Dame on Fire	16 March 2022	No	Yes	Yes	Filmed with IMAX-certified digital cameras. France only.
RRR	24 March 2022	No	Yes	Yes	Released in 3D (conversion) in select territories, and in 2D in other territories. Aspect ratio opened up to 1.90:1 for the entire film. India and selected territories only.
Everything Everywhere All at Once	25 March 2022	No	Yes	Yes	One-night-only engagement in select locations on 30 March 2022. Re-released in select North American IMAX theaters on 29 April 2022.
Morbius	1 April 2022	No	Yes	Yes	Preserved on home media for IMAX Enhanced on Sony Pictures Core.
Ambulance	8 April 2022	No	Yes	Yes	
K.G.F. Chapter 2	14 April 2022	No	Yes	Yes	First IMAX DMR Indian Kannada language release. India and selected territories only. Limited engagement.
Fantastic Beasts: The Secrets of Dumbledore	15 April 2022	No	Yes	Yes	
Detective Conan: The Bride of Halloween	15 April 2022	No	Yes	Yes	In Japan only.
Doctor Strange in the Multiverse of Madness	6 May 2022	No	Yes	Yes	In 3D (conversion) and 2D. Filmed entirely with IMAX-certified digital cameras. An exclusive 5-minute preview of Top Gun: Maverick was attached and was shown in the expanded aspect ratio of 1.90:1 and preserved on home media for IMAX Enhanced on Disney+.
Shin Ultraman	13 May 2022	No	Yes	Yes	In Japan only.
The Roundup	18 May 2022	No	Yes	Yes	South Korea only.
Top Gun: Maverick	27 May 2022	No	Yes	Yes	Filmed entirely with IMAX-certified Sony CineAlta VENICE cameras with an aspect ratio opened up to 1.90:1 for 60 minutes. Re-released in IMAX on 24–30 June. Re-released again in IMAX on 12 August. Home-Media retained the expanded Aspect Ratio for IMAX scenes.
Jurassic World Dominion	10 June 2022	No	Yes	Yes	In 3D (conversion) and 2D.
Dragon Ball Super: Super Hero	11 June 2022	No	Yes	Yes	
Lightyear	17 June 2022	No	Yes	Yes	Released in 2D in select territories. Released in 3D in other territories. Filmed entirely with IMAX-virtual camera. The first American CGI-animated feature film to have its expanded 1.43:1 aspect ratio for 25 minutes of the film at IMAX GT Laser Venues and 1.90:1 aspect ratio at IMAX Digital Venues, and preserved on home media in the latter for IMAX Enhanced on Disney+. The first film to have a new IMAX virtual camera in its production.
Elvis	24 June 2022	No	Yes	Yes	Selected territories only. Re-released in select North American IMAX theaters on 26 August 2022.
Kira We El Gin	30 June 2022	No	Yes	Yes	First IMAX DMR Egyptian release. Egypt only.
Minions: The Rise of Gru	1 July 2022	No	Yes	Yes	Released in 2D in select territories. Released in 3D in other territories.
Thor: Love and Thunder	8 July 2022	No	Yes	Yes	In 3D (conversion) and 2D. Filmed almost entirely with IMAX-certified digital cameras with an aspect ratio opened up to 1.90:1 for 35 minutes and preserved on home media for IMAX Enhanced on Disney+.
Kingdom 2: Far and Away	15 July 2022	No	Yes	Yes	Japan only.
Alienoid	20 July 2022	No	Yes	Yes	South Korea only.
Nope	22 July 2022	No	Yes	Yes	50 minutes filmed with IMAX 65mm cameras. Home-Media (excl Streaming) retained the expanded Aspect Ratio in a cropped 1.78:1 (16:9) for IMAX scenes.
Shamshera	22 July 2022	No	Yes	Yes	
Hansan: Rising Dragon	27 July 2022	No	Yes	Yes	South Korea only.
Moon Man	29 July 2022	No	Yes	Yes	China only.
Emergency Declaration	3 August 2022	No	Yes	Yes	Philippines and South Korea only.
Satan's Slaves 2: Communion	4 August 2022	No	Yes	Yes	The first IMAX Indonesian film.
Bullet Train	5 August 2022	No	Yes	Yes	Preserved on home media for IMAX Enhanced on Sony Pictures Core.
Warriors of Future	5 August 2022	No	Yes	Yes	China, Hong Kong and Macau only. Released in Hong Kong and Macau on 25 August. First mainstream Hong Kong film released in IMAX format.
One Piece Film: Red	6 August 2022	No	Yes	Yes	Japan, the Philippines, and North America only. Released in the Philippines on 28 September and in North America on 4 November.
Laal Singh Chaddha	11 August 2022	No	Yes	Yes	
E.T. the Extra-Terrestrial	12 August 2022	No	Yes	Yes	Originally released in 1982.
Jaws	2 September 2022	No	Yes	Yes	Originally released in 1975. Re-released in 2025 in 3D (conversion) and 2D.
Miracle in Cell No.7	8 September 2022	No	Yes	Yes	Indonesia only.
Brahmastra	9 September 2022	No	Yes	Yes	In 3D (conversion) and 2D. India and selected territories only.
The Woman King	16 September 2022	No	Yes	Yes	
Moonage Daydream	16 September 2022	No	Yes	Yes	
Avatar: Remastered	23 September 2022	No	Yes	Yes	Originally released in 2009. In 3D and Variable HFR (48fps) 3D. Aspect ratio opened up to 1.78:1 for the entire film, within a 1.90:1 DCP, instead of constant width, for better viewing.
Don't Worry Darling	23 September 2022	No	Yes	Yes	Selected territories only.
Ponniyin Selvan: I	30 September 2022	No	Yes	Yes	First IMAX DMR Indian Tamil language release. India and selected territories only.
5 Centimeters per Second	30 September 2022	No	Yes	Yes	Originally released in 2007. Limited engagement in Japan only.
Home Coming	30 September 2022	No	Yes	Yes	Filmed entirely with IMAX-certified cameras. China only.
Ordinary Hero	30 September 2022	No	Yes	Yes	China and selected territories.
Amsterdam	7 October 2022	No	Yes	Yes	
Halloween Ends	14 October 2022	No	Yes	Yes	
Black Adam	21 October 2022	No	Yes	Yes	
Sword Art Online Progressive: Scherzo of Deep Night	21 October 2022	No	Yes	Yes	In Japan only.
Bardo, False Chronicle of a Handful of Truths	27 October 2022	No	Yes	No	Mexico only.
Suzume	11 November 2022	No	Yes	Yes	In Japan and the Philippines. Released in North America for a limited one-week engagement on 14 April 2023.
Black Panther: Wakanda Forever	11 November 2022	No	Yes	Yes	In 3D (conversion) and 2D. Filmed entirely with IMAX-certified Sony CineAlta VENICE cameras with an aspect ratio opening up to 1.90:1 for 20 minutes and preserved on home media for IMAX Enhanced on Disney+.
Fall	18 November 2022	No	Yes	Yes	Filmed entirely with IMAX-certified cameras. China only.
Devotion	23 November 2022	No	Yes	Yes	Debuted at the Toronto International Film Festival in IMAX at the Ontario Place Cinesphere on 12 September 2022.
Violent Night	2 December 2022	No	Yes	Yes	Selected territories only.
The First Slam Dunk	3 December 2022	No	Yes	Yes	In Japan and Philippines only.
Avatar: The Way of Water	16 December 2022	No	Yes	Yes	In 3D and Variable HFR (48fps) 3D. Presented in a theatrical 1.85:1 aspect ratio across all IMAX Venues (with Pillarboxing / Windowboxing). Behind the Scenes of Mission: Impossible – Dead Reckoning Part One, Creed III were attached and shown in an expanded aspect ratio of 1.90:1, as well as an exclusive preview for Oppenheimer, which was shown in an expanded aspect ratio of 1.43:1 in select IMAX theaters. Re-released 3 October 2025 in 4K HDR, with select scenes in HFR (48fps).
Babylon	23 December 2022	No	Yes	Yes	Selected territories only.

== 2023 ==
Name	Release date	Format			Notes
Name	Release date	70mm	Digital	Laser	Notes
The Wandering Earth 2	22 January 2023	No	Yes	Yes	Filmed entirely with IMAX-certified cameras. Released in China for IMAX 3D on 15 September 2024.
Full River Red	22 January 2023	No	Yes	Yes	China only.
Deep Sea	22 January 2023	No	Yes	Yes	In 3D. China only.
Hidden Blade	22 January 2023	No	Yes	Yes	China only.
Pathaan	25 January 2023	No	Yes	Yes	India and selected territories.
Ant-Man and the Wasp: Quantumania	17 February 2023	No	Yes	Yes	In 3D (conversion) and 2D. Select sequences filmed with IMAX-certified cameras, presented in 1.90:1 for 35 minutes and preserved on home media for IMAX Enhanced on Disney+.
Creed III	3 March 2023	No	Yes	Yes	Select sequences filmed with IMAX-certified Sony CineAlta VENICE cameras, presented in 1.90:1 for approximately 26 minutes.
Post Truth	10 March 2023	No	Yes	Yes	China only.
Pi	14 March 2023	No	Yes	Yes	Originally released in 1998. One-day-only, limited engagement.
Shazam! Fury of the Gods	17 March 2023	No	Yes	Yes	
Shin Kamen Rider	17 March 2023	No	Yes	Yes	
John Wick: Chapter 4	24 March 2023	No	Yes	Yes	
Bholaa	30 March 2023	No	Yes	Yes	In 3D. India and selected territories.
Dungeons & Dragons: Honor Among Thieves	31 March 2023	No	Yes	Yes	
The Super Mario Bros. Movie	5 April 2023	No	Yes	Yes	Released in 2D in select territories. Released in 3D in other territories.
The Three Musketeers: D'Artagnan	5 April 2023	No	Yes	Yes	France and UK only.
Beau Is Afraid	14 April 2023	No	Yes	Yes	
Detective Conan: Black Iron Submarine	14 April 2023	No	Yes	Yes	
Born to Fly	28 April 2023	No	Yes	Yes	China only.
Godspeed	28 April 2023	No	Yes	Yes	China only.
Ponniyin Selvan: II	28 April 2023	No	Yes	Yes	India and selected territories.
Guardians of the Galaxy Vol. 3	5 May 2023	No	Yes	Yes	In 3D (conversion) and 2D. Filmed entirely with IMAX-certified Red V-Raptor cameras. Aspect ratio opened up to 1.90:1 for the entire film and preserved on home media for Blu-ray 3D (in Japan) & IMAX Enhanced on Disney+.
Fast X	19 May 2023	No	Yes	Yes	Released in 2D in select territories. Released in 3D (conversion) in other territories.
Simhadri	20 May 2023	No	Yes	Yes	Originally released in 2003. Australia only. One-day-only, limited engagement.
The Little Mermaid	26 May 2023	No	Yes	Yes	Released in 2D in select territories. Released in 3D (conversion) in other territories. Aspect ratio opened up to 1.90:1 for select-sequences.
The Roundup: No Way Out	31 May 2023	No	Yes	Yes	South Korea and selected territories.
Spider-Man: Across the Spider-Verse	2 June 2023	No	Yes	Yes	Preserved on home media for IMAX Enhanced on Sony Pictures Core. Re-released on 19 January 2024
Transformers: Rise of the Beasts	9 June 2023	No	Yes	Yes	In 3D (conversion) and 2D.
The Flash	16 June 2023	No	Yes	Yes	
Lost in the Stars	22 June 2023	No	Yes	Yes	China only.
Indiana Jones and the Dial of Destiny	30 June 2023	No	Yes	Yes	Extended preview of The Creator was attached and was shown Exclusively for IMAX Theaters.
Never Say Never	6 July 2023	No	Yes	Yes	China only.
Chang'an	8 July 2023	No	Yes	Yes	China only.
Mission: Impossible – Dead Reckoning Part One	12 July 2023	No	Yes	Yes	Filmed entirely with IMAX-certified Sony CineAlta VENICE cameras, projected in 2.39:1 on all screens.
The Boy and the Heron	14 July 2023	No	Yes	Yes	
Creation of The Gods I	20 July 2023	No	Yes	Yes	China and selected territories.
Oppenheimer	21 July 2023	Yes	Yes	Yes	40 minutes shot with IMAX 65mm cameras. The first film to shoot sections in IMAX black-and-white analog photography. Presented in an expanded 1.43:1 aspect ratio on IMAX 70mm at IMAX GT Venues and Digital at IMAX GT Laser Venues. Presented in 1.90:1 for IMAX Digital Venues. The longest single-platter IMAX film to date, at 180 minutes. Home-Media (excl Streaming & DVD) retained the expanded Aspect Ratio in a cropped 1.78:1 (16:9) for IMAX scenes.
Wonder Family	21 July 2023	No	Yes	Yes	China only.
Smugglers	26, July 2023	No	Yes	Yes	South Korea only.
One and Only	28 July 2023	No	Yes	Yes	China only.
Kingdom 3	28 July 2023	No	Yes	Yes	Japan only.
The Moon	2 August 2023	No	Yes	Yes	South Korea only.
No More Bets	8 August 2023	No	Yes	Yes	China only.
Gran Turismo	11 August 2023	No	Yes	Yes	Presented in 1.90:1 for the entire film on all screens. Preserved on home media for IMAX Enhanced on Sony Pictures Core.
Blue Beetle	18 August 2023	No	Yes	Yes	Filmed entirely with IMAX-certified cameras with an aspect ratio opening up to 1.90:1 for 70 minutes.
MALBATT: Misi Bakara	24 August 2023	No	Yes	Yes	Malaysia and Singapore only
The Equalizer 3	1 September 2023	No	Yes	Yes	Released in an IMAX Enhanced version on 4K Blu-ray on 14 November 2023. Preserved on home media for IMAX Enhanced on Sony Pictures Core.
Jawan	7 September 2023	No	Yes	Yes	India and selected territories only.
The Nun II	8 September 2023	No	Yes	Yes	
A Haunting in Venice	15 September 2023	No	Yes	Yes	
Barbie	22 September 2023	No	Yes	Yes	Originally released on 21 July 2023.
Stop Making Sense	22 September 2023	No	Yes	Yes	Originally released in 1984.
The Volunteers: To the War	28 September 2023	No	Yes	Yes	China only.
Under the Light	28 September 2023	No	Yes	Yes	China only.
The Ex-File 4: Marriage Plan	28 September 2023	No	Yes	Yes	China only.
The Creator	29 September 2023	No	Yes	Yes	
Moscow Mission	29 September 2023	No	Yes	Yes	China only.
The Exorcist: Believer	6 October 2023	No	Yes	Yes	
Taylor Swift: The Eras Tour	13 October 2023	No	Yes	Yes	North America and selected territories only. Limited engagement.
Leo	19 October 2023	No	Yes	Yes	Filmed partially with IMAX-certified RED V-Raptor 8K cameras. India and selected territories.
Killers of the Flower Moon	20 October 2023	No	Yes	Yes	
Death Whisperer	26 October 2023	No	Yes	Yes	Thailand, Cambodia and selected territories.
Godzilla Minus One	3 November 2023	No	Yes	Yes	
The Marvels	10 November 2023	No	Yes	Yes	In 3D (conversion) and 2D. Aspect ratio opened up to 1.90:1 for 30 minutes and preserved on home media for IMAX Enhanced on Disney+.
Tiger 3	12 November 2023	No	Yes	Yes	India and selected territories.
The Hunger Games: The Ballad of Songbirds & Snakes	17 November 2023	No	Yes	Yes	Aspect ratio opened up to 1.90:1 for select-sequences.
12.12: The Day	22 November 2023	No	Yes	Yes	South Korea only.
Napoleon	22 November 2023	No	Yes	Yes	
Kubi	23 November 2023	No	Yes	Yes	Japan only.
Across the Furious Sea	25 November 2023	No	Yes	Yes	China only.
Maestro	1 December 2023	No	Yes	Yes	Four-day exclusive engagement at TCL Chinese in LA and BFI London only.
Renaissance: A Film by Beyoncé	1 December 2023	No	Yes	Yes	Limited engagement
Animal	1 December 2023	No	Yes	Yes	India and selected territories.
Wonka	15 December 2023	No	Yes	Yes	
Endless Journey	15 December 2023	No	Yes	Yes	China only.
Aquaman and the Lost Kingdom	22 December 2023	No	Yes	Yes	In 3D (conversion) and 2D. Filmed entirely with IMAX-certified cameras with aspect ratio opened up to 1.78:1 for the entire film and preserved on Home-Media.
Spy × Family Code: White	22 December 2023	No	Yes	Yes	Japan and selected territories. Released in North America for a limited one-week engagement on 19 April 2024.
Salaar: Part 1 - Ceasefire	22 December 2023	No	Yes	Yes	India and selected territories.
Johnny Keep Walking!	29 December 2023	No	Yes	Yes	China only.

== 2024 ==
Name	Release date	Format			Notes
Name	Release date	70mm	Digital	Laser	Notes
Alienoid: Return to the Future	10 January 2024	No	Yes	No	
The Beekeeper	12 January 2024	No	Yes	Yes	
Captain Miller	12 January 2024	No	Yes	Yes	India and selected territories.
Queen Rock Montreal	18 January 2024	No	Yes	Yes	18–21 January only.
Golden Kamuy	19 January 2024	No	Yes	Yes	
Fighter	25 January 2024	No	Yes	Yes	In 3D. India and selected territories.
Argylle	2 February 2024	No	Yes	Yes	
YOLO	10 February 2024	No	Yes	Yes	China only.
Article 20	10 February 2024	No	Yes	Yes	China only.
Boonie Bears: Time Twist	10 February 2024	No	Yes	Yes	In 3D. China only.
Pegasus 2	10 February 2024	No	Yes	Yes	China only.
Madame Web	14 February 2024	No	Yes	Yes	Preserved on home media for IMAX Enhanced on Sony Pictures Core.
Haikyu!! The Dumpster Battle	16 February 2024	No	Yes	Yes	
Dune: Part Two	1 March 2024	Yes	Yes	Yes	Filmed entirely with IMAX-certified Arri Alexa 65 and Alexa Mini LF cameras. Expanded aspect ratio of 1.90:1 at IMAX Digital Venues. Select scenes in an expanded 1.43:1 aspect ratio at IMAX GT Venues (Both Laser and 70mm). Released in ten 70mm locations worldwide.
Ghostbusters: Frozen Empire	22 March 2024	No	Yes	Yes	Preserved on home media for IMAX Enhanced on Sony Pictures Core.
Ex Machina	27 March 2024	No	Yes	Yes	Originally released in 2015.
Godzilla x Kong: The New Empire	29 March 2024	No	Yes	Yes	In 3D (conversion) and 2D. Filmed entirely with IMAX-certified cameras with an aspect ratio opened up to 1.90:1 for 45 minutes.
SUGA: Agust D TOUR 'D-DAY' THE MOVIE	10 April 2024	No	Yes	Yes	18 and 13 April only.
Maidaan	10 April 2024	No	Yes	Yes	India and selected territories.
Dancing Village: The Curse Begins	11 April 2024	No	Yes	Yes	Filmed with IMAX-certified digital cameras.
Detective Conan: The Million Dollar Pentagram	12 April 2024	No	Yes	Yes	
Bade Miyan Chote Miyan	12 April 2024	No	Yes	Yes	In 3D, India and selected territories.
Civil War	12 April 2024	No	Yes	Yes	
Hereditary	24 April 2024	No	Yes	Yes	Originally released in 2018.
The Roundup: Punishment	24 April 2024	No	Yes	No	
Challengers	26 April 2024	No	Yes	Yes	
Howl's Moving Castle	30 April 2024	No	Yes	Yes	Originally released in 2004. China only.
Formed Police Unit	1 May 2024	No	Yes	Yes	China only.
Twilight of the Warriors: Walled In	1 May 2024	No	Yes	Yes	China only.
The Fall Guy	3 May 2024	No	Yes	Yes	
Kingdom of the Planet of the Apes	10 May 2024	No	Yes	Yes	
The Blue Angels	17 May 2024	No	Yes	Yes	Filmed entirely with IMAX-certified Sony CineAlta VENICE cameras.
The Beach Boys	21 May 2024	No	Yes	Yes	Limited engagement.
Uncut Gems	22 May 2024	No	Yes	Yes	Originally released in 2019.
Furiosa: A Mad Max Saga	24 May 2024	No	Yes	Yes	
Bad Boys: Ride or Die	7 June 2024	No	Yes	Yes	Preserved on home media for IMAX Enhanced on Sony Pictures Core.
Walk the Line	8 June 2024	No	Yes	Yes	China only.
Be My Friend	8 June 2024	No	Yes	Yes	China only.
Inside Out 2	14 June 2024	No	Yes	Yes	Released in 2D in select territories. Released in 3D in other territories.
Midsommar Director's Cut	20 June 2024	No	Yes	Yes	Originally released in 2019.
Kalki 2898 AD	27 June 2024				India and selected territories.
A Quiet Place: Day One	28 June 2024	No	Yes	Yes	
Customs Frontline	28 June 2024	No	Yes	Yes	China only.
Despicable Me 4	3 July 2024	No	Yes	Yes	Released in 2D in select territories. Released in 3D in other territories.
A Place Called Silence	3 July 2024	No	Yes	Yes	China only.
A Legend	10 July 2024	No	Yes	Yes	China only.
Indian 2	12 July 2024	No	Yes	Yes	India and selected territories.
Kingdom 4: Return of the Great General	12 July 2024	No	Yes	Yes	
Successor	16 July 2024	No	Yes	Yes	China only.
Twisters	19 July 2024	No	Yes	Yes	
Deadpool & Wolverine	26 July 2024	No	Yes	Yes	In 3D (conversion) and 2D. Enhanced framing technique known as "Frame-Break" used to enhance CGI effects, making effects travel "outside" the screen.
The Traveller (2024 film)	26 July 2024	No	Yes	Yes	Filmed entirely with IMAX-certified digital cameras, China only.
My Hero Academia: You're Next	2 August 2024	No	Yes	Yes	
Decoded	3 August 2024	No	Yes	Yes	Filmed entirely with IMAX-certified digital cameras, China only.
Borderlands	9 August 2024	No	Yes	Yes	
Upstream	9 August 2024	No	Yes	Yes	China only.
White Snake: Afloat	10 August 2024	No	Yes	Yes	China only.
Alien: Romulus	16 August 2024	No	Yes	Yes	Aspect ratio opened up to 1.90:1 for the entire film.
Go for Broke	16 August 2024	No	Yes	Yes	China only.
Takluk: Lahat Datu	22 August 2024	No	Yes	Yes	Malaysia only
The Crow	23 August 2024	No	Yes	Yes	
Everything Everywhere All At Once	28 August 2024	No	Yes	Yes	Originally released in 2022.
The Colors Within	30 August 2024	No	Yes	Yes	
The Greatest of All Time	5 September 2024	No	Yes	Yes	India and select territories.
Beetlejuice Beetlejuice	6 September 2024	No	Yes	Yes	
Taklee Genesis	12 September 2024	No	Yes	Yes	Aspect ratio opened up to 1.90:1 for 98 minutes of the film, Thailand and selected territories.
Wolfs	20 September 2024	No	Yes	Yes	
Transformers One	20 September 2024	No	Yes	Yes	In 3D and 2D.
Megalopolis	27 September 2024	No	Yes	Yes	5 minutes of expanded 1.43:1 aspect ratio scenes at select IMAX GT Laser venues.
The Wild Robot	27 September 2024	No	Yes	Yes	Released in 2D in select territories. Released in 3D (conversion) in other territories.
Devara: Part 1	27 September 2024	No	Yes	Yes	Aspect ratio opened up to 1.90:1 for select scenes. India and selected territories.
The Volunteers: The Battle of Life and Death	30 September 2024	No	Yes	Yes	China only.
High Forces	30 September 2024	No	Yes	Yes	China only.
A Tapestry of A Legendary Land	1 October 2024	No	Yes	Yes	China only.
Bureau 749	1 October 2024	No	Yes	Yes	China only.
Joker: Folie à Deux	4 October 2024	Yes	Yes	Yes	Filmed entirely with IMAX-certified Arri Alexa 65 and Alexa Mini LF cameras. Also released on IMAX 70mm. 55 minutes of footage in an expanded 1.43:1 aspect ratio at IMAX GT Venues (Both Laser and 70mm) and 1.90:1 aspect ratio at IMAX Digital Venues. Home-Media retained the expanded Aspect Ratio for IMAX scenes.
Death Whisperer 2	10 October 2024	No	Yes	Yes	Aspect ratio opened up to 1.90:1 for the entire film, Thailand, and selected territories.
The Witch	23 October 2024	No	Yes	Yes	Originally released in 2015.
Venom: The Last Dance	25 October 2024	No	Yes	Yes	In 3D (conversion) and 2D. Filmed entirely with IMAX-certified digital cameras with aspect ratio opening up to 1.90:1 for 40 minutes and preserved on home media for IMAX Enhanced on Sony Pictures Core and Disney+.
Singham Again	1 November 2024	No	Yes	No	India and Select territories.
Cesium Fallout	1 November 2024	No	Yes	Yes	China and Hong Kong only.
Paddington in Peru	8 November 2024	No	Yes	Yes	
The Lighthouse	13 November 2024	No	Yes	Yes	Originally released in 2019.
Kanguva	14 November 2024	No	Yes	No	In 3D. India and selected territories.
Red One	15 November 2024	No	Yes	Yes	
Gladiator II	22 November 2024	No	Yes	Yes	
Wicked	22 November 2024	No	Yes	Yes	Released in 2D in select territories. Released in 3D (conversion) in other territories.
Moana 2	27 November 2024	No	Yes	Yes	Released in 2D in select territories. Released in 3D in other territories.
Lupin III: The Castle of Cagliostro	29 November 2024	No	Yes	Yes	Originally released in 1979.
Pushpa 2: The Rule	5 December 2024	No	Yes	No	
The Green Knight	11 December 2024	No	Yes	Yes	Originally released in 2021.
Kraven the Hunter	13 December 2024	No	Yes	Yes	Preserved on home media for IMAX Enhanced on Sony Pictures Core.
The Lord of the Rings: The War of the Rohirrim	13 December 2024	No	Yes	Yes	
Mufasa: The Lion King	20 December 2024	No	Yes	Yes	In 3D and 2D.
Jason Zhang Brilliance Tour	20 December 2024	No	Yes	Yes	China only.
The Brutalist	20 December 2024	No	Yes	Yes	
A Complete Unknown	25 December 2024	No	Yes	Yes	
Nosferatu	25 December 2024	No	Yes	Yes	
La Grande Maison Paris	30 December 2024	No	Yes	Yes	

== 2025 ==
Name	Release date	Format			Notes
Name	Release date	70mm	Digital	Laser	Notes
Se7en	3 January 2025	No	Yes	Yes	Originally released in 1995.
Game Changer	10 January 2025	No	Yes	Yes	India and select territories.
Wolf Man	17 January 2025	No	Yes	Yes	
Mobile Suit Gundam GQuuuuuuX: Beginning	17 January 2025	No	Yes	Yes	
Talk to Me	22 January 2025	No	Yes	Yes	Originally released in 2023.
The Colors Within	23 January 2025	No	Yes	Yes	One-night-only engagement.
Sky Force	24 January 2025	No	Yes	No	India and select territories.
Dark Nuns	24 January 2025	No	Yes	Yes	Philippines, Indonesia and South Korea only.
Creation of the Gods II	29 January 2025	No	Yes	Yes	China and North America. Aspect ratio opened up to 1.90:1 for the entire film.
Operation Hadal	29 January 2025	No	Yes	Yes	Filmed entirely with IMAX-certified digital cameras. China only. Released in China for Special Edition on 30 August 2025.
Ne Zha 2	29 January 2025	No	Yes	Yes	In 3D and 2D. China and select territories only. Released in the U.S. on February 12 and from A24 on August 22.
Detective Chinatown 1900	29 January 2025	No	Yes	Yes	China only.
Legends of the Condor Heroes: The Gallants	29 January 2025	No	Yes	Yes	China only.
Companion	31 January 2025	No	Yes	Yes	Selected territories only.
IU Concert: The Winning	5 February 2025	No	Yes	Yes	Limited engagement. Two nights only.
God Save The Tuches	5 February 2025	No	Yes	No	
Becoming Led Zeppelin	7 February 2025	No	Yes	Yes	Early access on 5 February.
Chhaava	14 February 2025	No	Yes	Yes	India and select territories.
Captain America: Brave New World	14 February 2025	No	Yes	Yes	In 3D (conversion) and 2D. Filmed entirely with IMAX-certified digital cameras with an aspect ratio opening up to 1.90:1 for 30 minutes and preserved on home media for IMAX Enhanced on Disney+. The pre-show included a special version (The Fantastic Four: First Steps) of the IMAX Countdown.
In the Mood for Love	14 February 2025	No	Yes	Yes	Originally released in 2000. China only.
SNL50: The Homecoming Concert	14 February 2025	No	Yes	Yes	TV special. Released in the United States on 14 February 2025 for one-night-only.
Moonlight	26 February 2025	No	Yes	Yes	Originally released in 2016.
Mickey 17	7 March 2025	No	Yes	Yes	
Spring Breakers	19 March 2025	No	Yes	Yes	Originally released in 2012.
The Alto Knights	21 March 2025	No	Yes	Yes	
Snow White	21 March 2025	No	Yes	Yes	
Princess Mononoke	26 March 2025	No	Yes	Yes	Originally released in 1997. Selected territories only.
L2: Empuraan	27 March 2025	No	Yes	Yes	First IMAX DMR Indian Malayalam language release. India and select territories. With a 2.8:1 aspect ratio throughout and no expanded ratio scenes, the film displays thick black bars on IMAX screens, not utilizing their full height.
The Chosen: Last Supper	27 March 2025	No	Yes	No	TV series. Season 5, episodes 1 and 2. Two nights only. First collaboration with Fathom Events.
Sikandar	30 March 2025	No	Yes	Yes	
Pabrik Gula	31 March 2025	No	Yes	Yes	The third IMAX Indonesian film.
A Minecraft Movie	4 April 2025	No	Yes	Yes	Released in 2D in select territories. Released in 3D (conversion) in other territories.
Warfare	9 April 2025	No	Yes	Yes	
The Amateur	11 April 2025	No	Yes	Yes	
One to One: John & Yoko	11 April 2025	No	Yes	Yes	Originally released in 2024.
Yadang: The Snitch	16 April 2025				South Korea in select territories.
Sinners	18 April 2025	Yes	Yes	Yes	25 minutes shot with IMAX 65mm cameras. Presented in an expanded 1.43:1 aspect ratio for IMAX GT Venues with 70mm Film & Dual Laser, and 1.90:1 for IMAX Digital and IMAX with Laser. Home media retained the expanded aspect ratio in a cropped 1.78:1 (16:9) for IMAX scenes.
Detective Conan: One-eyed Flashback	18 April 2025	No	Yes	Yes	
Pink Floyd at Pompeii – MCMLXXII	24 April 2025	No	Yes	Yes	Originally released in 1972. Two nights only.
The Dumpling Queen	30 April 2025	No	Yes	Yes	China only.
Esaaf	17 April 2025	No	Yes	Yes	First IMAX DMR Saudi release.
The Open Door	1 May 2025	No	Yes	Yes	China only.
Thunderbolts*	2 May 2025	No	Yes	Yes	In 3D (conversion) and 2D. Filmed entirely with IMAX-certified digital cameras with an aspect ratio opening up to 1.90:1 for 40 minutes. The pre-show included a special version (The Fantastic Four: First Steps) of the IMAX Countdown.
Final Destination Bloodlines	16 May 2025	No	Yes	Yes	Filmed entirely with IMAX-certified Sony CineAlta VENICE cameras with an aspect ratio opened up to 1.90:1 for 50 minutes.
Project X (2025 Egyptian Film)	21 May 2025	No	Yes	Yes	Egypt only; Released IMAX in Kuwait, Saudi Arabia, Bahrain, the United Arab Emirates, and Oman on 5 June.
Mission: Impossible – The Final Reckoning	23 May 2025	No	Yes	Yes	Filmed almost entirely with IMAX-certified Sony CineAlta VENICE cameras with an aspect ratio opened up to 1.90:1 for 45 minutes. Home media retained the expanded aspect ratio for IMAX scenes.
Thug Life	5 June 2025	No	Yes	Yes	India and select territories only.
How to Train Your Dragon (2025)	13 June 2025	No	Yes	Yes	In 3D (conversion) and 2D. Select sequences filmed with IMAX-certified digital cameras with aspect ratio opening up to 1.90:1 for 50 minutes. Home media retained the expanded aspect ratio for IMAX scenes.
She's Got No Name	21 June 2025	No	Yes	Yes	China only.
F1	27 June 2025	No	Yes	Yes	Filmed entirely with IMAX-certified Sony CineAlta VENICE cameras with an aspect ratio opened up to 1.90:1 for the entire film.
Jurassic World Rebirth	2 July 2025	No	Yes	Yes	China and Japan only.
A Cool Fish 2	5 July 2025	No	Yes	Yes	Filmed entirely with IMAX-certified digital cameras. China only.
Superman	11 July 2025	No	Yes	Yes	In 3D (conversion) and 2D. Filmed entirely with IMAX-certified digital cameras with an aspect ratio opened up to 1.90:1 for the entire film.
Curious Tales of a Temple	12 July 2025	No	Yes	Yes	China only.
You Are The Best	18 July 2025	No	Yes	Yes	China only.
The Lychee Road	18 July 2025	No	Yes	Yes	China only.
Demon Slayer: Kimetsu no Yaiba – The Movie: Infinity Castle – Part 1: Akaza Returns	18 July 2025	No	Yes	Yes	Released in the U.S. on 12 September 2025 The first Japanese animated feature film to have its expanded 1.43:1 aspect ratio for IMAX GT Laser Venues.
Omniscient Reader: The Prophecy	23 July 2025	No	Yes	Yes	South Korea in select territories.
The Fantastic Four: First Steps	25 July 2025	No	Yes	Yes	In 3D (conversion) and 2D. Filmed almost entirely with IMAX-certified digital cameras with an aspect ratio opened up to 1.90:1 for the entire film. 5 minutes of the film also opened up to 1.43:1 in IMAX GT Laser Venues. The pre-show included a special version of the IMAX Countdown. Home media retained the expanded aspect ratio for IMAX Enhanced on Disney+ with the 1.43:1 IMAX scenes in a cropped 1.78:1 (16:9).
Dead to Rights	25 July 2025	No	Yes	Yes	China only.
TOKYO Mobile Emergency Room The Movie 2 Nankai Mission	1 August 2025	No	Yes	Yes	Japan only.
Nobody	2 August 2025	No	Yes	Yes	China only.
Dead & Company Live From Golden Gate Park	3 August 2025				
Weapons	8 August 2025	No	Yes	Yes	
Dongji Rescue	8 August 2025	No	Yes	Yes	Filmed entirely with IMAX-certified digital cameras. China only.
Athadu	9 August 2025				Originally released in 2005. India and select territories only.
War 2	14 August 2025	No	Yes	Yes	India and select territories.
The Grateful Dead Movie	14 August 2025				Originally released in 1977. Limited engagement.
The Shadow's Edge	16 August 2025	No	Yes	Yes	China only.
Black Swan	21 August 2025	No	Yes	Yes	Originally released in 2010. Limited engagement.
Girl Climber	24 August 2025				One-night-only.
The Exit 8	29 August 2025	No	Yes	Yes	Japan only.
No Other Choice	29 August 2025	No	Yes	Yes	South Korea only. Re-released for one-night-only in select territories on 8 December 2025.
Sign o' the Times	29 August 2025				Originally released in 1987.
The Conjuring: Last Rites	5 September 2025	No	Yes	Yes	Aspect ratio opened up to 1.90:1 for 10 minutes. Home media retained the expanded aspect ratio in an open matte 1.78:1 (16:9) for IMAX scenes.
Shenzhou13	5 September 2025	No	Yes	Yes	China only.
Spinal Tap II: The End Continues	12 September 2025	No	Yes	Yes	
David Gilmour Live at the Circus Maximus, Rome	17 September 2025				
Evil Unbound	18 September 2025	No	Yes	Yes	China only.
Him	19 September 2025	No	Yes	Yes	Aspect ratio opened up to 1.90:1 for the opening sequence. Home media retained the expanded aspect ratio in an open matte 1.78:1 (16:9) for the opening sequence.
Chainsaw Man – The Movie: Reze Arc	19 September 2025	No	Yes	Yes	Released in 2D in Japan only. Released in 3D (conversion) and 2D in the U.S. on October 24.
The Smashing Machine	22 September 2025	No	Yes	Yes	Limited engagement. Ending scene shot with IMAX 65mm cameras with the scene opening up to 1.43.1 in all theaters.
One Battle After Another	26 September 2025	Yes	Yes	Yes	Presented in an expanded 1.43:1 aspect ratio on 70mm Film at IMAX GT Venues and Digital at IMAX GT Laser Venues. Presented in 1.90:1 for IMAX Digital Venues. Shot in full-frame VistaVision, it is the first feature-length narrative film presented entirely in 1.43:1 aspect ratio.
The Volunteers: Peace at Last	30 September 2025	No	Yes	Yes	China only.
A Writer's Odyssey II	1 October 2025	No	Yes	Yes	Filmed entirely with IMAX-certified digital cameras. China only.
Three Kingdoms: Starlit Heroes	1 October 2025	No	Yes	Yes	China only.
Death Whisperer 3	1 October 2025	No	Yes	Yes	Aspect ratio opened up to 1.90:1 for the entire film, Thailand and selected territories.
Kantara: Chapter 1	2 October 2025	No	Yes	Yes	Aspect ratio opened up to 1.90:1 for 30 minutes. India and select territories.
Tron: Ares	10 October 2025	No	Yes	Yes	In 3D (conversion) and 2D. Filmed entirely with IMAX-certified digital cameras with an aspect ratio opened up to 1.90:1 for 50% of the film. Home-Media retained the expanded aspect ratio for IMAX Enhanced on Disney+
Chien 51	15 October 2025	No	Yes	Yes	France only.
Frankenstein	17 October 2025	No	Yes	Yes	Limited engagement in select territories.
Thamma	21 October 2025	No	Yes	Yes	India and select territories.
Springsteen: Deliver Me from Nowhere	24 October 2025	No	Yes	Yes	
Depeche Mode: M	28 October 2025				
G-Dragon in Cinema: Übermensch	29 October 2025				
Baahubali: The Epic	31 October 2025	No	Yes	Yes	Aspect ratio opened up to 1.90:1 for the entire film. India and select territories.
Back to the Future	31 October 2025	No	Yes	Yes	Originally released in 1985.
Hope on the Stage: The Movie	3 November 2025				
Predator: Badlands	7 November 2025	No	Yes	Yes	In 3D (conversion) and 2D.
Jujutsu Kaisen: Execution	7 November 2025	No	Yes	Yes	Released in the U.S. on 5 December 2025
The Running Man	14 November 2025	No	Yes	Yes	
Soyut Dışavurumcu Bir Dostluğun Anatomisi Veyahut Yan Yana	14 November 2025	No	Yes	Yes	First IMAX DMR Turkish release.
Wicked: For Good	21 November 2025	No	Yes	Yes	Released in 2D in select territories. Released in 3D (conversion) in other territories.
Scarlet	21 November 2025	No	Yes	Yes	Preserved on home media for IMAX Enhanced on Sony Pictures Core.
Zootopia 2	26 November 2025	No	Yes	Yes	Released in 2D in select territories. Released in 3D in other territories.
Amsterdamned II	4 December 2025	No	Yes	Yes	First IMAX DMR Dutch release.
Dhurandhar	5 December 2025	No	Yes	Yes	India and select territories.
Gezhi Town	6 December 2025	No	Yes	Yes	China only.
Rolling Stones: Live at the Max	10 December 2025	No	Yes	Yes	Shot with IMAX film cameras. Originally released in 1991.
The Shining	12 December 2025	No	Yes	Yes	Originally released in 1980.
Avatar: Fire and Ash	19 December 2025	No	Yes	Yes	In 3D and Variable HFR (48fps) 3D. Presented in a theatrical 1.85:1 aspect ratio across all IMAX Venues (with Pillarboxing / Windowboxing). An exclusive 5-minute prologue preview of The Odyssey was attached, with the prologue being shown in an expanded 1.43:1 aspect ratio at select IMAX GT Venues (Film & Laser). The pre-show included a special version (Star Wars: The Mandalorian and Grogu) of the IMAX Countdown.
Escape from the Outland	31 December 2025	No	Yes	Yes	Filmed partially with IMAX-certified digital cameras. China only.

== 2026 ==
Name	Release date	Format			Notes
Name	Release date	70mm	Digital	Laser	Notes
Dziki	1 January 2026				Poland only.
Boy	14 January 2026				South Korea only.
Kokuho	16 January 2026	No	Yes	Yes	Originally released in 2025. Re-released in Japan on 16 January 2026. One-night U.S. IMAX release on 21 January 2026.
Project Y	21 January 2026				South Korea only.
Mercy	23 January 2026	No	Yes	Yes	In 3D (conversion) and 2D. Filmed entirely with IMAX-certified Sony CineAlta VENICE cameras with an aspect ratio opened up to 1.90:1 for 60 minutes. Enhanced framing technique known as "Frame-Break" used to enhance CGI effects, making effects travel "outside" the screen.
Border 2	24 January 2026	No	Yes	Yes	India and select territories only.
Marty Supreme	30 January 2026	No	Yes	Yes	Originally released in December 25, 2025.
Mobile Suit Gundam: Hathaway	30 January 2026	No	Yes	Yes	
Marsupilami	4 February 2026	No	Yes	No	France only.
Stray Kids: The dominATE Experience	6 February 2026				
Eric Church: Evangeline vs. The Machine Comes Alive	11 February 2026				
Wuthering Heights	13 February 2026	No	Yes	Yes	
Crime 101	13 February 2026	No	Yes	Yes	
Kung Fu	13 February 2026	No	Yes	Yes	Taiwan only.
Gintama: Yoshiwara in Flames	13 February 2026	No	Yes	Yes	
Pegasus 3	17 February 2026	No	Yes	Yes	China and selected territories only.
Blades of The Guardians	17 February 2026	No	Yes	Yes	China and Hong Kong only.
Scare Out	17 February 2026	No	Yes	Yes	China only.
2DIE4	19 February 2026	No	Yes	Yes	First IMAX DMR Brazilian release. Filmed entirely with IMAX-certified digital cameras with aspect ratio opened up to 1.90:1 for the entire film. First released in the US, and later in Brazil.
EPiC: Elvis Presley in Concert	20 February 2026	No	Yes	Yes	One-week limited engagement.
ATHOS - Au cœur de la Patrouille de France	25 February 2026	No	Yes	No	Filmed entirely with IMAX-certified digital cameras with aspect ratio opened up to 1.90:1 for the entire film. France only.
Twenty One Pilots: More Than We Ever Imagined	26 February 2026				
Scream 7	27 February 2026	No	Yes	Yes	[1184]
The Bride!	6 March 2026	No	Yes	Yes	Filmed entirely with IMAX-certified Sony CineAlta VENICE cameras with an aspect ratio opened up to 1.90:1 for 55 minutes. 15 minutes of the film also opened up to 1.43:1 in IMAX GT Laser venues.
Hoppers	6 March 2026	No	Yes	Yes	Released in 2D in select territories. Released in 3D in other territories. The pre-show included a special version (Star Wars: The Mandalorian and Grogu) of the IMAX countdown.
Ghost Board	12 March 2026	No	Yes	Yes	Thailand and selected territories only.
Kiki's Delivery Service	13 March 2026	No	Yes	Yes	Originally released in 1989. Selected territories only. Re-released in Japan on June 19, with an 4K restoration.
Golden Kamuy: Abashiri Kangoku Shûgeki-hen	13 March 2026	No	Yes	Yes	Japan only.
Tommy	17 March 2026				Originally released in 1975.
Danur: The Last Chapter	18 March 2026	No	Yes	Yes	Indonesia only.
Dhurandhar: The Revenge	19 March 2026	No	Yes	Yes	India only.
Project Hail Mary	20 March 2026	Yes	Yes	Yes	Filmed entirely with IMAX-certified digital cameras with an aspect ratio opened up to 1.43:1 at IMAX 70mm and IMAX GT Laser venues and 1.85:1 (with Pillarboxing / Windowboxing) at IMAX Digital venues for 75% of the film. An exclusive 5-minute prologue preview of The Odyssey was attached, with the prologue being shown in an expanded 1.43:1 aspect ratio at select IMAX GT Venues (Film Only) as well as a 1.43.1 trailer for Dune: Part Three (Film & Laser). Re-released on April 17 at select IMAX locations. Home-Media retained the expanded Aspect Ratio in both a cropped 1.78:1 (16:9) and full-frame 1.43:1 across multiple releases.
The Super Mario Galaxy Movie	1 April 2026	No	Yes	Yes	Released in 2D in select territories. Released in 3D in other territories.
Detective Conan: Fallen Angel of the Highway	10 April 2026	No	Yes	Yes	Japan and Thailand only
Cave of Forgotten Dreams	15 April 2026	No	Yes	Yes	In 3D (conversion). Originally released in 2010. Selected territories only. Two days only.
Lee Cronin's The Mummy	17 April 2026	No	Yes	Yes	
Whisper of the Heart	21 April 2026	No	Yes	Yes	Originally released in 1995. Selected territories only.
Michael	24 April 2026	No	Yes	Yes	Re-released in May 15 at select IMAX locations.
Sakamoto Days (2026 film)	29 April 2026	No	Yes	Yes	Japan only.
The Devil Wears Prada 2	30 April 2026	No	Yes	Yes	China only.
Cold War 1994	1 May 2026	No	Yes	Yes	China and Hong Kong only.
Mortal Kombat II	8 May 2026	No	Yes	Yes	Filmed entirely with IMAX-certified digital cameras with aspect ratio opened up to 1.90:1 for 45 minutes of the film.
The Secret World of Arrietty	19 May 2026	No	Yes	Yes	Originally released in 2010. Selected territories only.
Colony	21 May 2026	No	Yes	Yes	South Korea and Mexico.
Star Wars: The Mandalorian and Grogu	22 May 2026	No	Yes	Yes	In 3D (conversion) and 2D. Filmed entirely with IMAX-certified digital cameras with an aspect ratio opened up to 1.43:1 for 55 minutes of the film at IMAX GT Laser Venues and 1.90:1 for IMAX Digital Venues. The pre-show included a special version of the IMAX Countdown. Home-Media retained the expanded Aspect Ratio for Physical Media and IMAX Enhanced on Disney+ with the 1.43:1 IMAX scenes in a cropped 1.78:1 (16:9).
7 Dogs	27 May 2026	No	Yes	Yes	Arab countries only
Kattalan	28 May 2026				India only
Memento	29 May 2026	No	Yes	Yes	Originally released in 2000. China only.
De Gaulle : Résistance	3 June 2026	No	Yes	No	France only.
Peddi	4 June 2026	No	Yes	Yes	India and select territories.
Masters of the Universe	5 June 2026	No	Yes	Yes	Selected territories only.
Disclosure Day	12 June 2026	No	Yes	Yes	
Toy Story 5	19 June 2026	No	Yes	Yes	Released in 2D in select territories. Released in 3D in other territories.
Big Fish & Begonia	19 June 2026	No	Yes	Yes	Originally released in 2016. China only.
Supergirl	26 June 2026	No	Yes	Yes	Released in 2D in select territories. Released in 3D (conversion) in other territories. Filmed entirely with IMAX-certified Sony CineAlta VENICE cameras. Aspect ratio opens up to 1.90:1 for 52 minutes.
Crossing	26 June 2026	No	Yes	Yes	China only.
Minions & Monsters	1 July 2026	No	Yes	Yes	Released in 2D in select territories. Released in 3D in other territories.
De Gaulle : Liberté	3 July 2026	No	Yes	No	France only.
Moana	10 July 2026	No	Yes	Yes	Released in 2D in select territories. Released in 3D (conversion) in other territories.
Kung Fu Soccer	11 July 2026	No	Yes	Yes	China only.
Hope	15 July 2026	No	Yes	Yes	South Korea and select territories.
The Odyssey	17 July 2026	Yes	Yes	Yes	First feature film to be shot entirely with IMAX 65mm cameras. Presented in an expanded 1.43:1 aspect ratio on 70mm Film at IMAX GT Venues and Digital at IMAX GT Laser Venues. Presented in 1.90:1 for IMAX Digital Venues.
All Wishes Come True!	18 July 2026	No	Yes	Yes	China only.
Chiikawa the Movie: The Secret of the Mermaid Island	24 July 2026	No	Yes	Yes	Japan only.
Spider-Man: Brand New Day	31 July 2026	No	Yes	Yes	China, Japan, and South Korea only. Expanded to select domestic theaters on 7 August 2026. Aspect ratio opened up to 1.90:1 for the entire film. Also available in an expanded 1.90:1 letterboxed format in Standard Flat venues. Home-Media retained the expanded aspect ratio for IMAX Enhanced on Sony Pictures Core.
Once Upon a Time in the Middle East	11 August 2026	No	Yes	Yes	Filmed partially with IMAX-certified digital cameras. China only.
Confession of a Shaman	12 August 2026	No	Yes	Yes	Aspect ratio opened up to 1.90:1 for the entire film, Thailand only.
The End of Oak Street	14 August 2026	No	Yes	Yes	Filmed entirely with IMAX-certified Sony CineAlta VENICE cameras. Aspect ratio opens up to 1.90:1 for 40 minutes.
Toxic	26 August 2026	No	Yes	Yes	Aspect ratio opens up to 1.90:1.
The Dog Stars	28 August 2026	No	Yes	Yes	
Onslaught	4 September 2026	No	Yes	Yes	
Mandaadi	10 September 2026	No	Yes	Yes	
Oasis: Don't Look Back in Anger	18 September 2026	No	Yes	Yes	Utilising 1:43:1 aspect ratio.
Resident Evil	18 September 2026	No	Yes	Yes	Filmed entirely with IMAX-certified digital cameras. Aspect ratio opens up to 1.90:1 for 33 minutes. Home-Media retained the expanded aspect ratio for IMAX Enhanced on Sony Pictures Core.
The Paradise	24 September 2026	No	Yes	Yes	India and select territories only.
Avengers: Endgame Encore	25 September 2026	No	Yes	Yes	Originally released in 2019. Filmed entirely with IMAX digital cameras. Re-release featuring "custom introduction, additional new footage, and a special end tag exclusive to Infinity Vision and IMAX releases." Aspect ratio opens up to 1.90:1 for the entire film.
Death Whisperer: Saming the Werebeast	30 September 2026	No	Yes	Yes	Aspect ratio opened up to 1.90:1 for the entire film, Thailand and selected territories.
Lalka	30 September 2026	No	Yes	Yes	Poland only.
Digger	2 October 2026	No	Yes	Yes	
Street Fighter	16 October 2026	No	Yes	Yes	Select sequences filmed with IMAX-certified digital cameras with aspect ratio opening up to 1.90:1 for 67 minutes.
Dominion of Darkness 2	8 October 2026	No	Yes	Yes	Indonesia only.
The Doll: Ghawiyah	29 October 2026	No	Yes	Yes	Indonesia only.
Godzilla Minus Zero	3 November 2026	No	Yes	Yes	Filmed entirely with IMAX-certified digital cameras. Aspect ratio opens up to 1.43.1 at IMAX GT Laser venues and 1.90.1 at IMAX Digital venues for 75 minutes. First non-English film to be presented in 1.43:1 aspect ratio.
Ramayana: Part 1	6 November 2026	No	Yes	Yes	In 3D (conversion). Filmed entirely with IMAX-certified digital cameras.
The Hunger Games: Sunrise on the Reaping	20 November 2026	No	Yes	Yes	Filmed entirely with IMAX-certified digital cameras. Aspect ratio opens up to 1.90.1 for 45 minutes of the film.
The Further Mis-Adventures of Cliff Booth	25 November 2026	No	Yes	Yes	Exclusive IMAX previews from November 25.
Avengers: Doomsday	18 December 2026	No	Yes	Yes	In 3D (conversion) and 2D. Selected territories only. Aspect ratio opened up to 1.90:1 for the entire film.
Dune: Part Three	18 December 2026	Yes	Yes	Yes	Select sequences shot with IMAX 65mm cameras and IMAX-certified digital cameras, with select scenes expanded to 1.43:1 at IMAX 70mm GT venues, IMAX Laser GT venues, and 1.90:1 at IMAX Digital Venues for 71 minutes.
King	December 24, 2026	Yes	Yes	Yes	India and select territories only.
Jumanji: Open World	December 25, 2026				

== 2027 ==
Name	Release date	Format			Notes
Name	Release date	70mm	Digital	Laser	Notes
Children of Blood and Bone	15 January 2027	No	Yes	Yes	Filmed entirely with IMAX-certified digital cameras.
The Prestige	27 January 2027	No	Yes	Yes	Originally released in 2006.
The Wandering Earth 3	6 February 2027	No	Yes	Yes	China only.
Narnia: The Magician's Nephew	12 February 2027	No	Yes	Yes	Exclusive IMAX previews from February 10.
Star Wars	19 February 2027	Yes	Yes	Yes	Originally released in 1977. Limited Engagement Only.
The Thomas Crown Affair	5 March 2027	No	Yes	Yes	Filmed entirely with IMAX-certified digital cameras. Aspect ratio opens up to 1.90:1 for select sequences.
Sonic the Hedgehog 4	19 March 2027	No	Yes	Yes	Aspect ratio opens up to 1.90:1 for the entire film.
Godzilla x Kong: Supernova	26 March 2027	No	Yes	Yes	In 3D (conversion) and 2D. Filmed entirely with IMAX-certified digital cameras.
Varanasi	7 April 2027	No	Yes	Yes	Filmed entirely with IMAX-certified digital cameras. First Indian film to be shot in 1.43:1 aspect ratio.
Panic Carefully	9 April 2027	No	Yes	Yes	Filmed entirely with IMAX-certified digital cameras. Aspect ratio opens up to 1.43.1 entirely at IMAX GT venues and 1.90.1 at IMAX Digital venues. The movie happens to be the first film shot on IMAX digital cameras that opens up to 1.43.1 for the entire runtime.
Satan's Slave 3: Origin	15 April 2027	No	Yes	Yes	Indonesia only.
The Legend of Zelda	30 April 2027	No	Yes	Yes	
The Resurrection of the Christ: Part One	6 May 2027	No	Yes	Yes	Filmed partially with IMAX-certified digital cameras.
Star Wars: Starfighter	28 May 2027	Yes	Yes	Yes	In 3D (conversion) and 2D. Filmed partially with IMAX-certified digital cameras. with select scenes expanded to 1.43:1 at IMAX 70mm GT venues, IMAX Laser GT venues, and 1.90:1 at IMAX Digital Venues.
How To Train Your Dragon 2	11 June 2027	No	Yes	Yes	In 3D (conversion) and 2D. Filmed partially with IMAX-certified digital cameras.
Spider-Man: Beyond the Spider-Verse	18 June 2027	No	Yes	Yes	Filmed entirely with IMAX-virtual camera with an Aspect ratio opens up to 1.43:1 at IMAX Laser GT venues, and 1.90:1 at IMAX Digital Venues for the entire film. Home media release to retain IMAX aspect ratio on Sony Pictures Core.
Shrek 5	30 June 2027	No	Yes	Yes	Released in 2D and 3D (conversion) in select territories. Limited engagement.
Man of Tomorrow	9 July 2027	No	Yes	Yes	In 3D (conversion) and 2D. Filmed entirely with IMAX-certified digital cameras.
A Minecraft Movie Squared	23 July 2027	No	Yes	Yes	
The Great Beyond	1 October 2027	No	Yes	Yes	
The Mummy: Book of the Dead	15 October 2027	No	Yes	Yes	Filmed partially with IMAX-certified digital cameras.
Frozen 3	24 November 2027	No	Yes	Yes	Released in 2D in select territories. Released in 3D in other territories.
Avengers: Secret Wars	17 December 2027	No	Yes	Yes	In 3D (conversion) and 2D. Filmed entirely with IMAX-certified digital cameras with an aspect ratio opened up to 1.90:1 for the entire film.

== 2028 ==
Name	Release date	Format			Notes
Name	Release date	70mm	Digital	Laser	Notes
The Batman: Part II	18 February 2028	No	Yes	Yes	Filmed partially with IMAX-certified digital cameras.
Elden Ring	3 March 2028	No	Yes	Yes	Filmed partially with IMAX-certified digital cameras.
Miami Vice '85	19 May 2028	No	Yes	Yes	Filmed entirely with IMAX-certified digital cameras.
The Resurrection of the Christ: Part Two	25 May 2028	No	Yes	Yes	Filmed partially with IMAX-certified digital cameras.
Days of Thunder	2 June 2028	No	Yes	Yes	Filmed partially with IMAX-certified digital cameras.
Incredibles 3	16 June 2028	No	Yes	Yes	Released in 2D in select territories. Released in 3D in other territories. Filmed partially with IMAX-virtual camera with aspect ratio opens up to 1.43:1 at IMAX Laser GT venues, and 1.90:1 at IMAX Digital Venues for select sequences.
Ramayana: Part 2	October 2028	No	Yes	Yes	Filmed partially with IMAX-certified digital cameras. India only.
Black Panther III	15 December 2028	Yes	Yes	Yes	In 3D (conversion) and 2D. Filmed partially with IMAX 65mm cameras.
