= Hi, Mom (2021 film) =

2021 Chinese comedy film by Jia Ling

- Promotional poster
- Traditional Chinese: 你好，李煥英
- Simplified Chinese: 你好，李焕英
- Literal meaning: Hello, Li Huanying
- Directed by: Jia Ling
- Written by: Jia Ling; Sun Jibin; Wang Yu; Bu Yu; Liu Honglu
- Starring: Jia Ling; Zhang Xiaofei; Shen Teng; Chen He
- Cinematography: Sun Ming; Liu Yin
- Edited by: Ye Xiang
- Music by: Fei Peng; Michael Lai Siu-Tin
- Production companies: Beijing Jingxi Culture & Tourism Co., Ltd.; Shanghai Ruyi Film & TV Production, Ltd.; Tianjin Maoyan Weiying Culture Media; Beijing Jingcai Time Culture Media; New Classic Media; Big Bowl Entertainment; Alibaba Pictures
- Distributed by: China Film Co., Ltd.; Tianjin Maoyan Weiying Culture Media; Beijing Jingcai Time Culture Media; Shanghai Ruyi Film & TV Production, Ltd.
- Release date: 12 February 2021 (China)
- Running time: 128 minutes
- Country: China
- Language: Mandarin
- Budget: RMB 380 million (US$59 million)
- Box office: US$841.7 million

Hi, Mom (Chinese: 你好，李焕英; pinyin: Nǐ hǎo, Lǐ Huànyīng; lit. 'Hello, Li Huanying') is a 2021 Chinese comedy film written, directed by and starring Jia Ling. It co-stars Zhang Xiaofei, Shen Teng, and Chen He. It is the first film directed by Jia Ling; a semi-autobiographical fantasy story about a young woman who is suddenly thrown back in time to the year 1981, where she meets her mother and develops a bond of sisterhood with her. The film's themes include familial love, maternal love, and filial piety. It was released on 12 February 2021 (Chinese New Year).

The film has grossed US$841 million at the box office, making it the third-highest-grossing film of 2021, the fourth-highest-grossing non-English film of all time, and the highest-grossing film by a solo female director until Barbie in 2023. The film received positive reviews, with word of mouth contributing to its popularity. In addition, the film also won the honor of excellent film at the 36th China Popular Film Awards, and won the award for excellent feature film at the 19th China Huabiao Awards.

== Plot ==
After her mother Li Huanying is fatally injured in a car accident in 2001, grief-stricken Jia Xiaoling finds herself transported back in time to the year 1981, where she becomes her mother's close friend. Jia Xiaoling feels that she has not been a good enough daughter in the present, so back in 1981, she does all she can to make Li Huanying happy, including setting her up with a factory manager's son, Shen Guanglin, in the hope of giving her mother a better husband, a better daughter, and a better life than she had the first time around.

== Cast ==
- Jia Ling as Jia Xiaoling
- Zhang Xiaofei as Li Huanying
  - Liu Jia as Li Huanying (middle-aged)
- Shen Teng as Shen Guanglin
- Chen He as Leng Te
- He He as Bao Yumei
  - Ding Jiali as Bao Yumei (middle-aged)
- Bao Wenjing as Zhao Yanhua
- Han Yunyun as Wang Qin
  - Wang Lin as Wang Qin (middle-aged)
- Xu Juncong as Xu Zhikai
- Qiao Shan as Jia Wentian
  - Jia Wentian as Jia Wentian (middle-aged)

== Production ==
Hi, Mom is Jia Ling's directorial debut. She spent more than three years writing the script with her co-writers, and production started on 25 September 2019. It was filmed on location at factories in Jia Ling's hometown of Xiangyang, Hubei.

The film is adapted from Jia Ling's 2016 comedy sketch of the same name, "Hello, Li Huanying", from season 1 of Comedy General Mobilization. It is also based on stories of Jia Ling's own mother, also named Li Huanying, who died in 2001 shortly after Jia started college. Jia made the film as a tribute to her mother.

The film's Chinese title literally means "Hello, Li Huanying" rather than "Hi, Mom". When asked about this difference, Jia Ling said that a mother is not just a mother, but her own person too.

=== Advance publicity ===
On 25 September 2019, Jia Ling published a post announcing the launch of the movie Hi, Mom.

On 7 January 2020, the film was announced. On 29 October, the film was announced to be scheduled for release on Lunar New Year's Day (12 February) 2021. On 16 December, the studio released a trailer titled "What kind of family is this?" On 24 December, the studio released posters of Jia Ling, Shen Teng and Zhang Xiaofei. On 25 December, the film released a promotional video titled "Where are you going, Dad". On 31 December, the studio released the music video for the promotional song "Little Girl Under the Street Lamp".

== Reception ==
=== Box office ===
Hi, Mom was released on 12 February 2021, and in its first weekend it grossed US$195 million (RMB 1.26 billion). The film's popularity grew through word of mouth, and on 15 February its single-day box office total was US$80 million, surpassing Detective Chinatown 3. By 16 February, the film had grossed more than RMB 1.8 billion, making Jia Ling the highest-grossing woman director in Chinese box office history (the previous record was RMB 1.36 billion for Us and Them, directed by Rene Liu). On 21 February the film's cumulative box office total surpassed Detective Chinatown 3, making it the highest-grossing film of the 2021 Chinese New Year holiday period. On 6 March, its gross reached 5.04 billion RMB, surpassing 2019's Nezha to become the second-highest-grossing film of all time in China. In late March, the film's gross surpassed Wonder Woman (2017) to become the highest-grossing film by a solo female director of all time. This record would be surpassed by Barbie in 2023. At noon on 10 March, the total box office exceeded RMB 5.15 billion, equivalent to more than US$785 million, surpassing Deadpool (US$783 million) and officially entered the top 100 at the global box office. On 20 March, the box office revenue exceeded 5.3 billion, making Jia Ling the highest-grossing female director in the world.

Though it was originally planned to be shown in theaters until 15 March 2021, the film's run was extended to 11 April 2021 and then later to May 2021.

=== International release ===
On 14 March 2021, the film's crew announced plans for international release.

=== Critical response ===
The film received positive reviews and higher ratings from viewers than the other major films released at the same time. As of 16 February 2021, the film's rating out of 10 is 8.2 on Douban, 9.5 on Maoyan, and 9.3 on Taopiaopiao. It has won praise for its authentic emotions and its portrayal of 1980s Xiangyang. Audiences found the film moving; many were moved to tears, and some called their families soon after leaving the theater. According to critic Lim Yian Lu, "despite this being Jia Ling’s directorial debut, it is on par with the work of an experienced director".

Cai Jianya wrote that the film's release had resonated with viewers. Due to the COVID-19 pandemic, many people had not traveled home to see their families for Chinese New Year in 2021, and some chose to watch a film about family as a result.

Han Haoyue wrote that Hi, Mom has become a representative of emotional resonance during the Spring Festival thanks to Jia Ling's sincere mother-daughter relationship and warm atmosphere. As a cross-border director, Jia Ling touched the audience with her original intention and truth, gained high box office and audience love, and demonstrated the unique charm and sincerity of a new director. At the same time, the success of this film also means that in the future Jia Ling needs to continue to explore new creative directions while maintaining her original intention.

=== Accolades ===
Date	Award	Category	Recipient(s) and nominee(s)	Result	Notes
2021	34th Golden Rooster Awards	Best Directorial Debut	Jia Ling	Nominated	
2021	34th Golden Rooster Awards	Best Actress	Zhang Xiaofei	Won	
2021	34th Golden Rooster Awards	Best Supporting Actress	Liu Jia	Nominated	
