= Happiness Is Coming =

- Traditional Chinese: 幸福馬上來
- Simplified Chinese: 幸福马上来
- Hanyu Pinyin: xìng fú mǎ shàng lái
- Directed by: Geng Gong; Cui Junjie
- Written by: Feng Gong; Wang Hongkun; Shu Huan
- Produced by: Huang Jianxin
- Starring: Feng Gong; Niu Li; Tu Songyan
- Production companies: Chongqing Film Group; Polybona Films
- Distributed by: Huaxia Film Distribution
- Release date: 8 June 2018 (China)
- Running time: minutes
- Country: China
- Language: Mandarin

Happiness Is Coming (Chinese: 幸福马上来) is a 2018 Chinese comedy film produced by Huang Jianxin and co-directed and co-written by Feng Gong. The film stars Feng Gong, Tu Songyan and Niu Li. The film was slated for release on June 8, 2018 in China.

== Cast ==
- Feng Gong as Ma Shanglai
- Niu Li as Ma Shanglai's wife
- Tu Songyan as Mao Xuewang
- Jia Ling
- Mao Junjie as Jin Zhen
- Bai Kainan as the disciple of Ma Shanglai
- Zhang Xiaofei as Lu Lu
- Yue Yunpeng
- Turbo Liu as Ma Xiao, Ma's son.
- Song Ning
- Xia Fan
- Jiang Hongbo as Sun Erxiang
- Liang Chao

== Production ==
Happiness Is Coming is Feng Gong's third film, ten years later after Eat Hot Tofu Slowly (2005) and A Big Potato (2007).

In order to deduce the real response of the character in critical circumstances, Feng Gong, who is 60 years old, still persists in not having to be a substitute, whether in a high altitude of dozens of meters rising and falling, or in a thrilling hopping fight. The audiences mistook him for Jackie Chan.

This film was shot entirely in southwest China's Chongqing, in various scenery spots, including Chongqing Jiefang Monument, Twin Towers, Great Hall of the People, Chaotianmen Bridge, Guotai Art Centre, and No. 4 Sun Yat-san Road.

== Release ==
On May 14, 2018, the first official trailer for the film was released along with a teaser poster.

Happiness Is Coming was scheduled for release on 8 June 2018 in China.
