= Five Hundred Miles (film) =

- Traditional Chinese: 交換人生
- Simplified Chinese: 交换人生
- Literal meaning: Swapping Lives
- Hanyu Pinyin: Jiāohuàn Rénshēng
- Directed by: Su Lun
- Screenplay by: Su Lun
- Starring: Lei Jiayin; Zhang Xiaofei; Zhang Youhao
- Edited by: Ron Chan
- Release date: 22 January 2023
- Country: China
- Language: Mandarin

Five Hundred Miles is a 2023 Chinese fantasy comedy film directed by Su Lun. It was released on 22 January 2023 (Chinese New Year).

== Plot ==
Eighteen-year-old Lu Xiaogu switches places with lawyer Zhong Da, the boyfriend of 30-year-old Jin Hao, who Lu Xiaogu is secretly in love with.

== Cast ==
- Lei Jiayin as Zhong Da
- Zhang Xiaofei as Jin Hao
- Zhang Youhao as Lu Xiaogu

== Release ==
The film was released on 22 January 2023 (Chinese New Year). By 21:20 on the day of its release, it had grossed 150 million RMB.
