= Thirteen Princess Trees =

2006 film directed by Lü Yue

- Film poster
- Directed by: Lü Yue
- Screenplay by: Liu Ying; Lü Yue
- Based on: Blade vs. Blade by He Dacao
- Produced by: Liu Jing; Wang Qingyong; Hao Jianguo; Zhao Guoguang (E.P.); Zhou Xiaoning (E.P.)
- Cinematography: Xu Wei
- Edited by: Yan Tao
- Music by: Liu Sola
- Production companies: Beijing Golden Skyway Media Company; Changchun Film Group Corporation
- Distributed by: Forbidden City Films; Golden Network Asia (Asia & Hong Kong)
- Release date: October 24, 2006 (Tokyo)
- Running time: 98 minutes
- Country: China
- Languages: Sichuanese; Mandarin

Thirteen Princess Trees (Chinese: 十三棵泡桐; Chinese: 十三棵泡桐; pinyin: shí sān kē pào tóng) is a 2006 Chinese drama film directed by cinematographer-cum-director Lü Yue and based on the novel Blade vs. Blade by He Dacao. The film, Lü's fifth as director, was shot on digital video primarily in Chengdu, the capital of China's Sichuan province.

Thirteen Princess Trees was produced by Beijing Golden Skyway Media Company and the Changchun Film Group Corporation.

The film follows several disaffected youth in the fictional Thirteen Princess High School in Chengdu. Feng (Liu Xin), the film's protagonist, is a short-haired tomboy who has a love affair with the jock, Taotao (Duan Bowen). With the arrival of Bao (Zhao Mengqiao), a student from Beijing, Feng finds herself gravitating to the new presence.

== Cast ==
- Liu Xin as Feng, a tomboy in a high school in Chengdu;
- Duan Bowen as Taotao, the high school jock and the object of Liu Xin's affection;
- Zhao Mengqiao as Bao, a transfer student from Beijing;
- Chen Keliang as A-Li, a privileged student under the protection of Taotao;
- Wang Jing as Jojo, the class monitor;
- Luo Yadan as Eva, a handicapped student who observes the others from afar;
- Shang Hui as Feng's father, a local police officer.

== Release controversy ==
Thirteen Princess Trees's tale of disaffected youth was already "tamed" for the authorities before even being filmed. As compared to He Dacao's original novel, much of the film's depiction of youth delinquency and sexuality was already excised.

After its win at the 19th Tokyo International Film Festival, Thirteen Princess Trees was set to be released throughout Asia. Originally set to be released in mainland China on March 23, 2007, the film, at the last minute, was pulled by the China Film Bureau for a "second review." Officially the reason for the delay was said to be due to delays in the transference from digital to 35 mm film, although rumors remained that the film's depiction of sexuality and violence had caused authorities to reconsider their original "content" approval. On the other hand, Trees' Chinese distributor, Forbidden City Films, blamed the delay on unexpectedly tight scheduling issues.

== Reception ==
Thirteen Princess Trees garnered the Special Jury Prize at the 19th Tokyo International Film Festival.
