= Zhang Xiaofei (actress) =

Chinese comedian

- 张小斐
- Born: January 10, 1986 (age 40); Anshan, Liaoning, China
- Education: Beijing Film Academy
- Occupation: Actress
- Years active: 2006–present
- Notable work: Hi, Mom

Chinese name
- Simplified Chinese: 张小斐
- Traditional Chinese: 張小斐
Transcriptions
Standard Mandarin
- Hanyu Pinyin: Zhāng Xiǎofěi

Zhang Xiaofei (Chinese: 张小斐; pinyin: Zhāng Xiǎofěi; born January 10, 1986) is a Chinese actress and comedian.

== Life ==
Zhang Xiaofei was born in 1986 in Anshan, Liaoning. In 1997 she studied dancing at Minzu University, and in 2001 she joined a People's Armed Police performance troupe (Chinese: 中国武警文工团). Four years later, she was accepted to the Beijing Film Academy performance institute. She studied there in the same graduating class as Yang Mi, Yuan Shanshan, Jiao Junyan, and Jing Chao. In 2009 she graduated as a top student in her department and joined China Broadcasting Performing Arts Group (Chinese: 中国广播艺术团), where she studied under comedian Feng Gong and met another protégé of Feng Gong's, Jia Ling. With Jia Ling's help, Zhang Xiaofei gradually became a comedian. In 2016, Jia established Big Bowl Entertainment, and Zhang signed on as its first artist.

== Filmography ==
=== TV series ===
- 2009 – Yangjiao (仰角) – as Liu Lian
- 2009 – Medal – as Si Meizi
- 2010 – Gan Si Dui (敢死队) – as Shu Yajie
- 2011 – Tian Xing Jian (天行健) – as Song Huimin
- 2012 – Thorn in the Flesh – as Meimei
- 2012 – Marshal Liu Bocheng – as Zha Xiaoying
- 2013 – Lie Yan (烈焰) – as Liu Yali
- 2014 – The Third Way of Love – as Sun Xiaolian (guest)
- 2014 – Ma Xiangyang Xiaxiang Ji (马向阳下乡记) – as Qi Huai
- 2016 – What If
- 2017 – Don't Zhuang B – season 3
- 2020 – Happy Hunter – as Zhenbao

=== Film ===
- 2006 – Fenghuo Suiyue (烽火岁月) – as Lin Xiaotong
- 2009 – The Village School's Winter – as Huihui
- 2010 – Dabing's Shakespeare – as Zhang Ran
- 2011 – The Space Dream – as Zhou Xiaosu
- 2016 – Pili Family – as Mili
- 2018 – Happiness Is Coming – as Lulu
- 2019 – A Fantastic Encounter – as Cunhua
- 2020 – Electromagnetic King Pili Family – as Mili
- 2021 – Hi, Mom – as Li Huanying
- 2023 – Five Hundred Miles – as Jin Hao
- 2024 – YOLO – as Du Ledan
- 2026 – Kung Fu Soccer – as Shuangshuang

=== Variety shows ===
- 2014 – Yiqi Lai Xiao Ba (一起来笑吧)
- 2015 – Xiju Ban de Chuntian (喜剧班的春天) – season 1
- 2015 – Top Funny Comedian – season 1
- 2016 – Top Funny Comedian – season 2
- 2016 – Comedy General Mobilization – season 1
- 2016 – Golden Night – season 1
- 2017 – Top Funny Comedian – season 3
- 2017 – Xianchu Dangdao (鲜厨当道)
- 2017 – Happy Theater – season 1
- 2018 – I Am the Actor
- 2017 – Happy Theater – season 2

She also performed in skits in the Spring Festival Gala in 2012, 2013, 2015, 2018, 2019, 2020, and 2021.
