= Octopus with Broken Arms =

- Simplified Chinese: 误杀3
- Traditional Chinese: 誤殺3
- Hanyu Pinyin: Wùshā Sān
- Directed by: Gan Jianyu
- Written by: Chen Sicheng; Wu Pipi; Li Peng; Hu Xiaonan
- Produced by: Chen Sicheng
- Starring: Xiao Yang; Tong Liya; Duan Yihong; Cya Liu
- Cinematography: Du Jie; He Shan
- Edited by: Ma Linxi
- Production companies: Beijing Yitong Legend Film Culture Co., Ltd. Wanda Film; Tao Piao Piao; Shanghai Ruyi Film and Television Production Co., Ltd. Khorgos Buhao Yisi Film Culture Co., Ltd.
- Distributed by: Beijing Yitong Legend Film Culture Co., Ltd. Wanda Film; Wuzhou Film Distribution Co., Ltd.
- Release date: 28 December 2024
- Running time: 109 minutes
- Country: China
- Language: Mandarin
- Box office: CN¥933 million

Octopus with Broken Arms (Chinese: 误杀3) is a 2024 Chinese crime thriller film directed by Gan Jianyu, produced and co-written by Chen Sicheng, and starring Xiao Yang, Tong Liya, Duan Yihong, and Cya Liu. It is a sequel to Fireflies in the Sun (2021) and the third installment in the Mistaken Kill film series. The film picks up the story of Zheng Bingrui (Xiao Yang), a wealthy businessman whose daughter is kidnapped during a holiday celebration. The film premiered in China on 28 December 2024.

== Plot ==
Wealthy businessman Zheng Bingrui hosts a party for his eight‑year‑old daughter, Tingting, during a Vesak celebration. He invites the girl's teacher, Li Huiping, along with parents and classmates. During the gathering, Tingting unexpectedly goes missing from the estate grounds.

Police are called in, and Officer Zhang Jingxian heads the investigation. Zheng and Li receive a ransom demand, prompting Zheng to follow the kidnappers' precise instructions. Li—feeling responsible since the girl disappeared under her watch—joins him in attempting to rescue Tingting. To prevent endangering the child, the kidnappers insist on eliminating official intervention, leading the pair to evade the police and undertake a series of escalating tasks.

As Zheng and Li race through city streets, they complete orders broadcast live—moving between locations to drop off packages and answer coded questions. Meanwhile, Zhang's team uncovers evidence pointing to a prior incident known as the "619 incident", involving the disappearance of refugee children on 19 June 2017. Investigators suspect trafficking links and possible connections to the current abduction.

Through flashbacks, the narrative reveals Zheng's past as an orphan who benefited from dubious networks to build his business. Suspicion initially falls on a former employee, Shi Fu'an, who had ties to Zheng and once received financial help from him. Fu'an and another grieving parent, Ya Yin, coordinate the kidnapping as part of a broader plan.

Ultimately, the abduction is intended not for ransom, but to expose a trafficking conspiracy involving Zheng and powerful figures linked to the 619 incident. Public pressure grows as live-streamed snippets and media coverage bring attention to corrupt officials and police complicity. Zheng is confronted with the moral fallout of his silence and indirect involvement in past abuses.

Faced with mounting evidence, Zheng decides to confess. At the behest of the kidnappers, he makes a public admission about his knowledge of trafficking and corruption, acknowledging he chose wealth over justice. In response, Tingting is released unharmed. Police intervene, arresting Ya Yin, Fu'an, and their collaborators. Zhang's team, compelled by public outcry, also begins scrutinizing higher‑level corruption within its ranks.

In the aftermath, Zheng publicly surrenders himself. The film closes with scenes implying societal demands for institutional reform, while on-screen data underscores the global toll of missing children.

== Cast ==
- Xiao Yang as Zheng Bingrui, father of Zheng Tingting.
- Tong Liya as Li Huiping, Tingting's teacher.
- Duan Yihong as Zhang Jingxian
- Cya Liu as Ya Yin
- Ye Quanxi as Zheng Tingting
- Wang Zhenglong as Wu Dayi
- Feng Bingbing as Shi Fu'an
- Zhou Chuchu as Tinaya
- Bokeh Kosang as Ah Lu
- Chen Hao
- Jack Kao as Damon
- Terence Yin as Mendoza
- Sandrine Pinna as Liang Su'e
- Amy Lo as news anchor
- Fan Jingyi as Ah Jie

== Release ==
Octopus with Broken Arms was released on 28 December 2024, in mainland China, and on 9 January 2025, in Hong Kong and Macau.

=== Box office ===
Octopus with Broken Arms grossed 933 million yuan in Chinese box office, making it the weekly box office champion in mainland China.
