= A Place Called Silence =

- Theatrical release poster
- Traditional Chinese: 默殺
- Simplified Chinese: 默杀
- Directed by: Sam Quah
- Written by: Sam Quah; Wang Zhizhi; Wang Yimeng
- Produced by: Ren Xiaoyi; You Wenwei; Yang Jun
- Starring: Wang Chuanjun; Ning Chang; Francis Ng
- Cinematography: Zhang Ying
- Edited by: Zhang Zhiyan; Zhou Yuan
- Production companies: Tianjin Maoyan Weiying Culture Media; Tao Piao Piao; China Film Co., Ltd. Wanda Media
- Distributed by: Tianjin Maoyan Weiying Culture Media; China Film Co., Ltd. Tao Piao Piao
- Release date: July 3, 2024
- Running time: 119 minutes
- Country: China
- Language: Mandarin
- Box office: $192.9 million

A Place Called Silence (Chinese: 默杀; pinyin: Mò shā) is a 2024 Chinese crime thriller film directed by Sam Quah, written by Quah, Wang Zhizhi and Wang Yimeng, and starring Wang Chuanjun, Ning Chang, and Francis Ng. The film tells the story of a girls' middle school plagued by bullying, where a student's tragic death sparks a wave of disappearances. A Place Called Silence was released on July 3, 2024.

== Plot ==
It is January 2006 in Malaysia, in a community still recovering from the 2004 Indian Ocean earthquake and tsunami. A student at Jing Hwa Girls' High School, Xiaotong, is a yanba (does not talk) and is glued to a wall by a group of sadistic girls. She is rescued by her mother, Li Han. Then one day the power goes out and the girls come back to the scene of the incident, lighting candles. Suddenly a masked assassin kills three of them.

Han is a janitor at the school and has negotiated with her school's principal to allow her to attend. Two days after the murder she is questioned and given a notebook to write down what she knows. With her mother present they start pressuring her to talk but she does not say a word. Both the mother and daughter play dumb and don't say anything even when pressed by the parents. Their landlord Xu Ma consistently pesters them with putting up donations for her tsunami charity.

Another one of the girls is locked inside a bus and killed by another masked figure. Xiaotong has a vision of a huge dove before a school performance. A confetti ornament above the stage is opened and out comes the body of the dead girl. All the girls start screaming and run out of the hall. It turns out there is another masked figure working alongside Han and they suspect it is a maintenance worker Lin Zaifu who was helping move furniture into the apartment of Xiaotong's neighbor.

Then Xiaotong herself is kidnapped and dragged upstairs by that other masked figure. Xiaotong tries to go retrace the path and injures herself. She breaks into Zaifu's apartment and finds nothing. The garbage collection comes by and Han rips the bags open looking for her daughter but finds only a sandal. They arrest yet another guy who was wearing the same black clothes with the white mask as the masked figure but it turns out to be a mentally ill pervert who just secretly films women in private places. The police, led by Dai Guodong, jail and torture him but he only gives cryptic messages. As they are going over his videos they find recordings of Han beating Xiaotong up, incriminating her as well.

As police wrap around and guard the household, their next clue is at Xu Ma's charity event. Zaifu is wanted by police for questioning so he drives Xu Ma to the wrong place to evade police and then keeps her taped up at an old house. Han finds the bodies of multiple dead girls. In a flashback, it is Zaifu's daughter Huijun's birthday and the sadistic girls celebrate it by forcing her to wear a headband with prickly thorns that make her head bleed with, torturing her pet dove and forcing her to drink a water bottle with her hairs. Xiaotong and her mother saw this but then decided to do nothing.

Their consistent pushing and harassment causes Huijun to fall through a glass window into the school gymnasium. She dies just as Zaifu reaches her. It is ruled a suicide. Because of this and after seeing the torture videos he decides to track down and kill all the girls including Xiaotong even though she didn't take part in it.

Han fights Zaifu as he tells her he already buried the girls. Han kidnaps Xu Ma (she is more worried about the property value going down now that a dead body is there) and they chase Zaifu in cars but then crash again. She stabs him repeatedly as he tells her she is guilty and her daughter is free from her. After attempting to pass through police blockade Zaifu is shot dead.

Five years earlier, Han's father beats her up over suspected infidelity and kicks her out of the house. She steals a knife from a local fruit vendor, and buries the body in the same garden.

In the present, Zaifu is interrogated but refuses to give straight answers. When no one is looking he walks to the edge of a building and jumps off. In jail they realize looking at the videos that Xiaotong killed her father after he attempted to rape her. Han maintains that she killed him. Guodong destroys the videocamera in a fit of rage.

Guodong was sentenced to prison for destroying evidence. In juvenile detention, it is revealed that Xiaodong can sing.

== Cast ==
- Wang Chuanjun as Lin Zaifu
- Ning Chang as Li Han, Xiaotong's mother
- Francis Ng as Dai Guodong
- Wang Sheng Di as Chen Yutong ("Xiaotong")
- Cai Ming as Mother Xu
- Chin Shih-chieh as Fang Juezhong
- Justin Huang as Wu Wang
- Xu Jiao as Lin Huijun
- Alan Aruna as Xiaowen

== Production ==
Principal photography of the film was done in Penang, Malaysia.

The film is a remake of a 2022 film of the same name, sometimes referred with an alternate title "Silent Murder: A Quiet Place", also directed by Sam Quah. The original was shot as early as 2017 as an independent production but its international release came only in 2024, after the release of this film. The two films have separate IMDb pages; however, the 2022 version has some incorrect information carried over from the 2024 version's IMDb page (i.e. wrong director – as of February 19, 2025).

== Reception ==
As of October 28, 2025, A Place Called Silence has received a rating of more than 6.1 on Douban, with a box office of $1.351 billion yuan. It is currently the sixth highest-grossing Chinese film of 2024.

== See also ==
- List of Chinese films of 2024
