= Cya Liu =

Chinese actress and singer (born 1989)

- 劉雅瑟
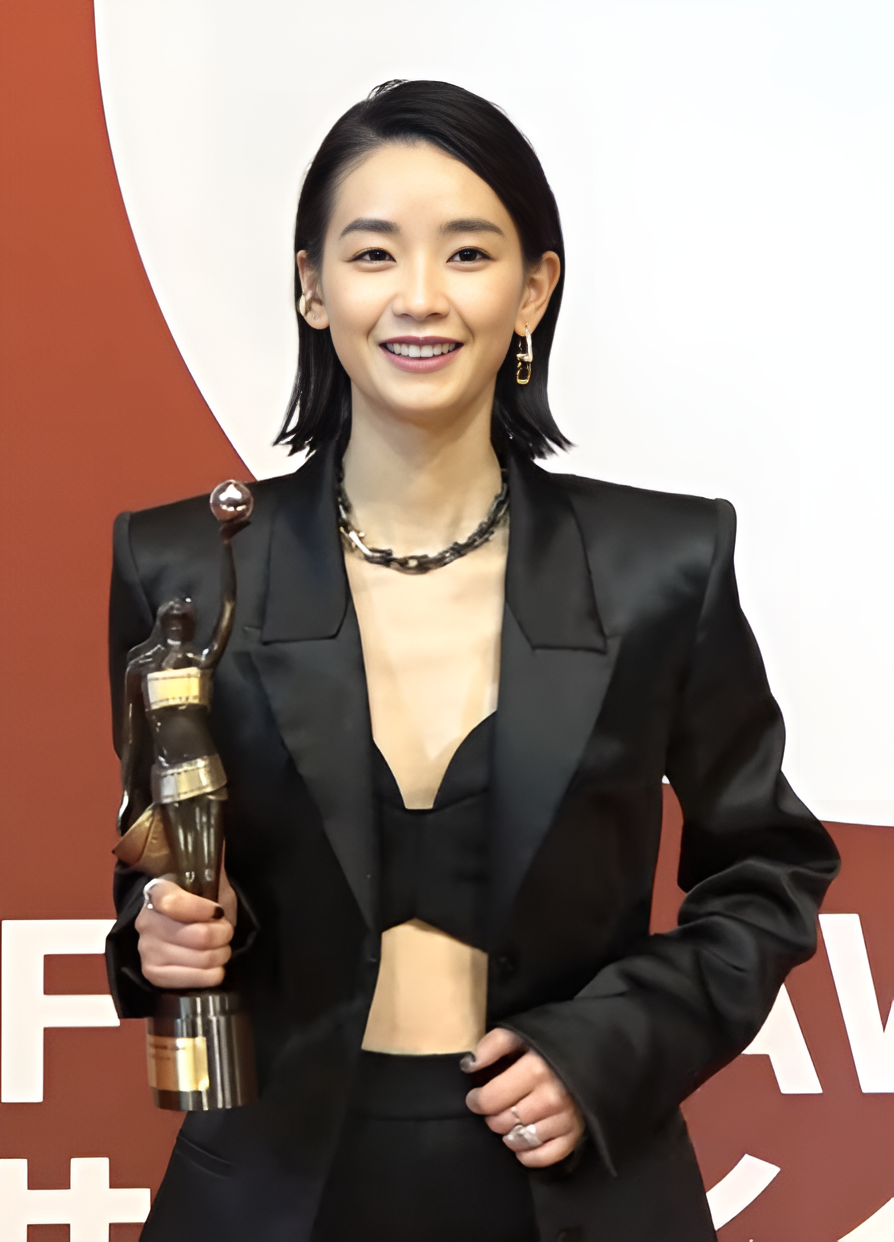
- Liu in 2022
- Born: Liu Xin; 13 January 1989 (age 37); Hengyang, Hunan, China
- Occupations: Singer; actress
- Years active: 2004–present
- Awards: Hong Kong Film Awards – Best Actress; 2022 Limbo

Liu Xin, known professionally as Cya Liu Ya-se (simplified Chinese: 刘雅瑟; traditional Chinese: 劉雅瑟; born 13 January 1989), is a Chinese actress and singer. Formerly as a member of the Chinese girl group OP, she was noticed through her role Zhu Xiaobei in the movie So Young (2013). In 2022, she won Best Actress at the 40th Hong Kong Film Awards for her role Wong To in Limbo.

== Filmography ==
=== Feature films ===
| Year | Film | Role | Notes/Ref. |
|---|---|---|---|
| 2006 | Thirteen Princess Trees | He Feng | |
| 2009 | Midnight Taxi | | Cameo |
| 2011 | Sleepless Fashion | Female interviewee | Cameo |
| 2012 | Under the Influence | Yan Bingbing | |
| 2012 | Who Says Elephants Can't Dance？ | Li Zhen | |
| 2012 | Joyful Reunion | Hou Yufan's cousin | |
| 2013 | So Young | Zhu Xiaobei | |
| 2013 | Up in the Wind | Li Meilan | |
| 2014 | Fleet of Time | Seven | |
| 2014 | Love Evolutionism | Pan Xiaoxing | |
| 2015 | Lost and Love | Ju | |
| 2015 | Rock Hero | Chunxiao | |
| 2015 | Love, at First... | Yuki | |
| 2016 | Money and Love | Shan Shan | |
| 2016 | Foolish Plans | Duoduo | |
| 2016 | Happiness | Xiao Yue | |
| 2018 | Transcendent | Guan Bei | |
| 2020 | Invisible Bedmate | Shen Yizhen | web film |
| 2020 | I'm Livin' It | Leung Wai-yin | |
| 2020 | Cafe by the Highway | Han Yuanfang | |
| 2021 | Limbo | Wong To | |
| 2022 | Reunion Dinner | Liu Zihong | |
| 2023 | The Polar Odyssey | Luo Lan | web film |
| 2023 | Qimen Dunjia | Feng Xiaoxiao | |
| 2023 | Sakra | Azi | |
| 2023 | Ex-files: Marriage Plan | Liu Yiliu | |
| 2023 | Beyond the Clouds | Fu Chunying | |
| 2023 | I Did It My Way | Vivian Xia | |
| Not yet released | Customs Frontline | Ying | |
| Not yet released | Ci Wei | Ye Fangfang | |
| Not yet released | Xin Dong | Ke Xiaozi | |
| Not yet released | Wan Huo | Jiayun | |
| Not yet released | Octopus with Broken Arms | Yayin | |

=== Television series ===
| Year | Show | Role | Notes |
|---|---|---|---|
| 2004 | Star Academy: Magical Castle | Herself | |
| 2014 | Late Night Taxi | Fangfang | |
| 2015 | Little Beast Flower Shop | Bank Manager | |
| 2015 | You Are My Sisters | An Le | |
| 2016 | Legend of Nine Tails Fox | Su Xi | Chapter Heng Niang |
| 2016 | Chinese Paladin 5 | Fang Caiwei | |
| 2016 | Women Must Be Stronger | Jiang Tianyou | |
| 2018 | Wan Jia Deng Huo | Feng Xiaoxia | |
| 2018 | Be Careful Delicacy | Zhao Xiaoxin | |
| 2020 | Zai Yi Qi (Be Together) | Zhao Ying | Chapter Huoshen Mountain |
| 2021 | Na Shi De Wo Men (Us Then) | Ye Ke | |
| 2024 | See Her Again | Chan Hoi Ching | |

=== Short films ===
| Year | Film | Role | Notes |
|---|---|---|---|
| 2012 | Night Play | | "夜戏". |
| 2013 | Tutor Interim | | "临时监护人". |
| 2017 | The Invisible Them: Handsome Express | Se | TFBoys x Oppo 易烊千玺 "看不见的ta之美男宅急便". YouTube. 14 September 2017. |
| 2023 | Way Out | Taxi Driver | Toyota "夜的出口". |
| 2023 | Curious Cat | Ada | Vogue Film "好奇的不是猫". YouTube. 27 June 2023. |

=== Variety shows ===
| Year | Show | Platform | Notes |
|---|---|---|---|
| 2004 | Star Academy | Hunan Economy Channel | 3rd place |
| 2007 | Wo Xing Wo Xiu | Dragon Television | OP group member, 1st-place winner |
| 2009 | Super Girl 2009 | Hunan Television | National Top 20 |
| 2016 | Interns at the Ghouls | Youku | "实习鬼吹灯". |
| 2023 | Sisters Who Make Waves | Hunan Television | "乘风2023". YouTube. 5 May 2023. |

== Awards and nominations ==
| Year | Award | Category | Nominated work | Results |
|---|---|---|---|---|
| 2014 | The 9th Chinese Young Generation Film Forum | Best New Actress of the Year | Rock Hero | Won |
| 2016 | The 1st Golden Screen Awards | Best Supporting Actress | Happiness | Nominated |
| 2020 | The 4th Pingyao International Film Festival | Fei Mu Honor Best Actress | Cafe by the Highway | Won |
| 2020 | The 39th Hong Kong Film Awards | Best Supporting Actress | I'm Livin' It | Nominated |
| 2020 | The 2nd HK01 movies | Most Popular Supporting Actress | I'm Livin' It | Nominated |
| 2022 | The 17th Hong Kong Film Directors' Guild Award | Best Actress | Limbo | Won |
| 2022 | The 12th Hong Kong Screenwriters' Guild | Best Acting | Limbo | Nominated |
| 2022 | The 40th Hong Kong Film Awards | Best Actress | Limbo | Won |
| 2022 | The 28th Hong Kong Film Critics Society Award | Best Actress | Limbo | Won |
| 2022 | The 59th Golden Horse Awards | Best Actress | Limbo | Nominated |
