= Kung Fu Soccer (film) =

2026 Chinese-Hong Kong film by Stephen Chow

- Theatrical release poster
- Traditional Chinese: 功夫女足
- Simplified Chinese: 功夫女足
- Directed by: Stephen Chow
- Written by: Stephen Chow; Hunny Ho (Note: There are nine screenwriters support for developing the screenplay of Stephen Chow and Hunny Ho, including Wong Wing-hong, Lam Tze-chung, Chan Man-keung, Jimmy Wan Chi-man, Xiao He, Huang Xiaopeng, Feng Xuebing, Woody Hui, and Gao Yan, thus they are credited as co-writers in the ending credits.)
- Story by: Stephen Chow
- Produced by: Stephen Chow; Ivy Kong; Zeng Xianglai; Ye Xiaobin
- Starring: Zhang Xiaofei; Dilraba Dilmurat; Lay Zhang; Takeru Satoh; Carina Lau
- Cinematography: Zhao Xiaofeng
- Edited by: Yeung Kai-wing
- Music by: Raymond Wong; Russell Wong
- Production companies: Star Overseas; China Film Group; Ruyi Film; Shenzhen Film Studio; Xingqun (Shenzhen) Cultural Communication
- Distributed by: Maoyan Entertainment; Encore Films (outside China)
- Release dates: 11 July 2026 (China); 13 August 2026 (Hong Kong)
- Running time: 106 minutes
- Countries: China; Hong Kong
- Languages: Mandarin; Cantonese; Thai; English; Korean; Japanese
- Budget: CN¥380 million
- Box office: $351.1 million

Kung Fu Soccer (Chinese: 功夫女足, lit. 'Kungfu Women's Football') is a 2026 sports comedy film directed, co-written and co-produced by Stephen Chow. A Chinese-Hong Kong co-production, the film is a spiritual successor to the 2001 film Shaolin Soccer, with Chow also served as the film's action director alongside Qin Pengfei. Featuring an ensemble cast led by Zhang Xiaofei, Dilraba Dilmurat, and Lay Zhang, with Takeru Satoh and Carina Lau making special appearances, the film follows the journey of a fictional Chinese women's football team called Emei as they compete in an ultimate football tournament. With a budget of CN¥380 million, it is the most expensive film of Chow's directorial career.

Kung Fu Soccer was released in China on 11 July 2026, and in Hong Kong on 13 August 2026, before being released in the United States, Canada and the United Kingdom on 23 October 2026. The film received mixed reviews from critics, but was a major financial success and grossed $351.1 million worldwide.

== Plot ==
The Emei women's football team, composed of ordinary working women, enters the Asian Women's Champions League as underdogs. Facing inadequate funding, substandard facilities, and societal prejudice, the players balance athletic training with part-time jobs while dealing with injuries and age-related challenges. The team is led by veteran captain Shuang, who also serves as its de facto coach. In her youth, she trained alongside her longtime teammate Jade and mentor Xu Feng. Although Shuang and Jade share a close bond, their relationship remains strained following Jade's past departure from the team to pursue an ultimately unsuccessful marriage. Under Xu's guidance, Emei dominates the early rounds, decisively defeating its opponents.

To maintain their competitive edge, the players incorporate martial arts techniques into their training regimen. However, Emei's momentum is halted by a defeat against the Pear Blossom team, whose players utilize psychological tactics, visual distractions, and deceptive contact to confuse Emei's players and the match officials. The setback forces Shuang to reconsider her autocratic leadership style and recognize that her relentless pressure to win has limited her teammates' individual capabilities. Meanwhile, Emei faces the threat of dissolution as Xu appears to turn against the team, its funding collapses, and its tactical plans are leaked to competitors.

Refusing to disband, the players unite to save the club independently. Shuang reconciles with Jade, apologizes to her alienated teammate Snowy to secure her return, and integrates reserve players into the core lineup. Emei subsequently defeats Pear Blossom in the semi-final to advance to the final. During this period, Xu reveals that his apparent betrayal was merely a ruse intended to help the team recognize its shortcomings in emotional intelligence, deeply moving Shuang.

In the final, Emei faces the Grand River team, an opponent distinguished by its exceptional physical strength. Despite falling two goals behind, Shuang remains composed, relinquishing sole responsibility for the team's performance and placing her trust in her teammates. Through coordinated teamwork and tactical creativity, Emei mounts a comeback, with Jade scoring a goal before substitute Loony nets the equalizer. With the decisive goal scored by Shuang, Emei completes the comeback to secure the championship, earning the applause of the crowd and the respect of its opponents.

== Cast ==
- Zhang Xiaofei as Shuang, captain of Emei (#10)
- Dilraba Dilmurat as Jade, star striker of Emei (#8)
- Lay Zhang as Xu Feng, Shuang's mentor and Emei's head coach
- Carina Lau as grandmaster, master of Emei
- Takeru Satoh as coach of Grand River
- Ai Mi as Chusan, Emei's reserve player (#21)
- Xue Ye as Snowy, Emei's reserve player (#20)
- Sisley Choi as 88, Emei's blind doctor who serves as a reserve goalkeeper in the final (#88)
- Angel Woo as Loony, Emei's reserve player who has a dissociative identity disorder (#3)
- Joss as Sisi, Emei's key goalkeeper (#1)
- Zhao Lina as chairwoman
- MC Jin as opening ceremony host
- Louis Cheung as referee
- Jimmy O. Yang as stadium worker
- Simon Chan as chairman
- May Li as Hao, Emei's reserve goalkeeper (#22)
- Qin Pengfei as Guanghui, Emei's assistant coach and chef.
- Isabelle Zhang as Xiao Yan, Emei's reserve player (#12)
- Sun Ziqi as Yanzhu, Emei's key player (#7)
- Laura Hong as Kaiqi, Emei's key player (#11)
- Shi Yufei as Pear Blossom player
- Jing Ruyang as Pear Blossom player
- Li Yizhen as Pear Blossom player
- Lai Lai as Xiao Fen, Emei's reserve player (#13)
- Ge Yixuan as Cuilian
- Wang Yitong as Luna
- Ma Xiyue as Yiru
- Zou Xia as Guiyuan
- Cui Tongjiao as Guizhi
- Zhang Di as Biyi
- Zhang Qi as mahjong friend of grandmaster
- Fang Yan as coach of Pearl Blossom
- Larine Tang as Golden Dragon team's captain
- Chanya McClory as Golden Dragon team's goalkeeper
- Xu Juncong as Golden Dragon team's coach
- Men Qiang as Golden Dragon player
- Steven Fung as Loony's ex-boyfriend
- Tang Xiangyu as reporter
- Li Mingyuan as pilot
- Miao Yilun as co-pilot
- E Jingwen as Golden Dragon player
- Avantgardey as closing ceremony performer
- Zhang Mei'e as Mei'e, mahjong friend of grandmaster
- Nadira Dolqun as Ganges team's goalkeeper
- Feng Xi as reporter

== Production ==
In June 2023, Stephen Chow took to social media to announce the completion of the script for his latest cinematic venture, initially titled Shaolin Women's Soccer.

Principal photography on the film begun in Shenzhen, China in March 2025. The shooting period lasted three months, with some scenes shot at the Daya Bay Sports Center in Huizhou.

== Release ==
On 22 June 2026, Chow announced on social media that Kung Fu Soccer was scheduled to be released in July 2026. A teaser trailer for the film was released on 6 July, with its planned release date in mainland China scheduled for 11 July 2026. The film was released theatrically in Hong Kong on 13 August 2026.

The film was released in the United States, Canada, Ireland and the United Kingdom on 23 October 2026 by Encore Films. It was released in its original Mandarin in addition to a new English-language dub featuring Stephen Chow, MC Jin and Jimmy O. Yang.

== Reception ==
=== Box office ===
The film opened at number one in China on 11 July 2026, earning CN¥260.6 million (US$38.3 million) on the day of release and CN¥500.3 million (US$73.6 million) over its first weekend.

=== Critical response ===
On the review aggregator website Rotten Tomatoes, 22% of 18 critics' reviews are positive, with an average rating of 4.2/10.

The South China Morning Post's Edmund Lee gave the film two stars out of five, finding the film intermittently amusing but hampered by a muddled story and mediocre soccer sequences. Writing for Screen Daily, Elizabeth Kerr was critical of the film's outdated jokes, paper-thin story, and sloppy special effects and action. Simon Abrams of RogerEbert.com gave the film zero out of four stars and wrote, "This pandering, ultimately dismal best-of compilation ignores the plot and characters of Shaolin Soccer and retains little of that earlier movie's humor or warmth."

In a more positive review, writing for 8days Tay Yek Keak gave the film 3.5 stars out of 5, calling the film "a unique, insane fun-filled escapade" but also criticized the "cheapo, cartoonish, two-dollar CGI special effects".

=== South Korean team portrayal controversy ===
The film sparked some controversy in South Korea for allegedly depicting the Pear Blossom team, who are South Korean and likely a reference to the real Ewha Womans University in Seoul, as deceptive, violent, habitually cheating, and obsessed with their appearance rather than athletic ability. Professor Seo Kyoung-duk of Sungshin Women's University said of the movie, "No matter how fictional a movie may be, it is wrong to repeatedly insult Korean sports." He compared the film's portrayal of the Ewha team to China Central Television propaganda against the K-beauty industry and another Chinese film from 2022 that also allegedly portrays Korean athletes as habitual cheaters, and urged the filmmakers to avoid invoking negative stereotypes of foreign nationals.
