= Pegasus 2 (film) =

- Theatrical release poster
- Traditional Chinese: 飛馳人生2
- Simplified Chinese: 飞驰人生2
- Literal meaning: Flying Life 2
- Directed by: Han Han
- Written by: Han Han; Zhou Yunhai
- Produced by: Chen Zhixi; Han Han; Li Du
- Starring: Shen Teng; Fan Chengcheng; Yin Zheng; Zhang Benyu; Sun Yizhou
- Cinematography: Bai Yuxia
- Music by: Roc Chen
- Production companies: Shanghai PMF Pictures; Shanghai Taopiaopiao Film and Television Culture Co., Ltd; Tianjin Maoyan Weiying Culture Media Co., Ltd; Beijing Bona Film Group Co., Ltd; China Film Co., Ltd
- Distributed by: Tianjin Maoyan Weiying Culture Media; China Film Co., Ltd; Shanghai Taopiaopiao Film and Television Culture Co., Ltd
- Release date: February 10, 2024
- Running time: 121 minutes
- Country: China
- Language: Mandarin
- Box office: $466.9 million

Pegasus 2 (Chinese: 飞驰人生2; pinyin: Fēichí rénshēng 2; lit. 'Flying Life 2') is a 2024 Chinese sports comedy drama film directed by Han Han and starring Shen Teng, Fan Chengcheng, Yin Zheng, Zhang Benyu and Sun Yizhou. The film tells the story of driving school coach Zhang Chi and potential rookie driver Li Xiaohai who set out to compete in the last Bayanbulak rally. It is a sequel to Pegasus and was released on February 10, 2024.

A third film, Pegasus 3 was released on February 17, 2026.

== Plot ==
After surviving the crash at the end of the previous film, Zhang Chi (Shen Teng) is once again down on his luck: the destruction of his car meant that his winning time did not count, since a vital official seal was lost and so the judges could not be certain that it was within the rules; and he has spent most of his money on physical therapy for the injuries he received during the crash.

To make ends meet he has become a driving instructor, relying on his reputation to attract clients and running the driving school he was seen taking his driving test at in the previous film. Unexpectedly, the director of the struggling Laotoule Automobile Factory (Jia Bing) offers to sponsor Zhang Chi to form a team to compete in the last Bayanbulak rally.

Seeing an opportunity to get back to racing, Zhang accepts the offer, forming a team comprising his old friends Sun Yuqiang (Yin Zheng) and Ji Xing (Zhang Benyu), a talented young driver named Li Xiaohai (Fan Chengcheng), and hapless driving school student Liu Xiande (Sun Yizhou).

== Cast ==
- Shen Teng as Zhang Chi
- Fan Chengcheng as Li Xiaohai
- Yin Zheng as Sun Yuqiang
- Zhang Benyu as Ji Xing
- Sun Yizhou as Liu Xiande
- Wei Xiang as Manager Ye
- Jia Bing as Factory director
- Zheng Kai as Ma Zongliang, racing director
- Feng Shaofeng as Manager Zou
- Huang Jingyu as Lin Zhendong
- Liu Haoran as Xindi Senior Technician

== Music ==
=== Soundtrack ===
- "Follow your feelings" (跟着感觉走) by Shen Teng, Fan Chengcheng, Yin Zheng, Zhang Benyu, Sun Yizhou
- "Melodia de Uma Noite" by Silvestre Fonseca

== Release ==
Pegasus 2 was released on February 10, 2024. It grossed $466.9 million during its box office run, nearly doubling its predecessors run.

== Reception ==
As of February 28, 2024, "Pegasus 2" has received a rating of more than 7.5 on Douban, with a box office of nearly $3.4 billion yuan, making it the second highest grossing Chinese film of 2024.

== See also ==
- List of Chinese films of 2024
