= YOLO (film) =

- Theatrical release poster
- Traditional Chinese: 熱辣滾燙
- Simplified Chinese: 热辣滚烫
- Literal meaning: Hot, Spicy, Boiling and Burning
- Directed by: Jia Ling
- Written by: Sun Jibin; Liu Honglu; Jia Ling; Guo Yupeng; Bu Yu
- Based on: 100 Yen Love by Masaharu Take
- Produced by: Li Ning; Tian Tian; Zhou Xiquing; Zhang Wen
- Starring: Jia Ling; Lei Jiayin
- Cinematography: Michael Liu
- Edited by: Zhou Xiaolin
- Music by: Fei Peng
- Production companies: New Century Pictures; China Film Co., Ltd; Alibaba Pictures; Little M Media; Big Bowl Entertainment Culture Media Company Limited; Tencent Penguin Pictures
- Distributed by: Shanghai Taopiaopiao Film and Television Culture Co., Ltd; China Film Co., Ltd; New Century Pictures
- Release date: February 10, 2024 (China)
- Running time: 130 minutes
- Country: China
- Language: Mandarin
- Box office: $484.5 million

YOLO (Chinese: 热辣滚烫; pinyin: Rè là gǔntàng; lit. 'A Hot', 'Spicy', 'Boiling', 'Burning [Life]') is a 2024 Chinese comedy-drama film directed by Jia Ling and starring Jia and Lei Jiayin. A comedic adaptation of the 2014 Japanese film 100 Yen Love, it tells the story of Du Leying who has stayed at home for many years, and after meeting boxing coach Hao Kun overcomes the challenges that follow and starts a new life.

YOLO grossed $484.5 million worldwide, making it the highest-grossing Chinese film in 2024.

== Plot ==
Leying (Jia Ling) has spent the last decade living in isolation with her parents after withdrawing from society, convinced that this reclusive lifestyle was the best way to "reconcile" with herself. Over the years, she developed unhealthy habits, grew estranged from her family and friends, and became deeply dissatisfied with her life. Her cousin Doudou (Yang Zi), an intern at a TV station, urges her to participate in a job search reality show. However, tensions surface during the show when Leying has a public quarrel with her sister Ledan (Zhang Xiaofei).

Further conflicts arise when Leying discovers her boyfriend Shan (Qiao Shan) and her best friend Lili (Li Xueqin) are secretly involved and expecting a child together. Betrayed and heartbroken, Leying breaks up with Shan and decides to move out of her parents' house to start anew. With her mother's support, she finds work as a waitress and crosses paths with Hao Kun (Lei Jiaying), a struggling boxing coach. Inspired by his passion for boxing, Leying agrees to become his student, believing it to be her opportunity to rebuild her life.

As their bond grows, Leying falls for Hao Kun, but their relationship falters when Hao Kun prioritizes personal gain over his dreams. Disillusioned, Leying confronts her struggles and resolves to take control of her destiny. Motivated by a desire to prove her strength, she commits to rigorous boxing training under a new coach. Over a year, Leying transforms herself, shedding weight and gaining both physical and emotional resilience.

Leying's efforts culminate in her first professional boxing match against a former champion. Though outmatched and suffering multiple injuries, Leying's indomitable spirit wins the admiration of the audience, her family, and even her estranged sister. While she loses the fight, Leying achieves a personal victory by proving her resilience and reclaiming her self-worth. When Hao Kun approaches her after the match to reconcile, she declines, choosing instead to focus on her newfound independence.

In her first-ever social media post, Leying declares she has "finally won" in her life, symbolizing her triumph over past struggles and her embrace of a brighter future.

== Cast ==
- Jia Ling as Du Leying
- Lei Jiayin as Hao Kun
- Zhang Xiaofei as Du Ledan
- Zhao Haiyan as Mom
- Zhang Qi as Dad
- Xu Jun Cong as BBQ restaurant manager
- Bu Yu as He Kun
- Zhu Tianfu as himself
- Liu Honglu as Rider

=== Special appearance ===
- Yang Zi as Dou Dou
- Li Xueqin as Li Li
- Ma Li as Ma Chunli
- Sha Yi as Laoliang

== Production ==
=== Filming ===
The film started shooting in Guangzhou at the end of September 2022, and wrapped up in November 2023. In addition to filming in Panyu, Yuexiu, Nansha and other places in Guangzhou, it was also shot in the nearby Pearl River Delta area, such as Zhongshan Park in Foshan and Xiqiao Mountain National Park.

According to Jia Ling, the film took over a year to be filmed because it was filmed five times. Also, she lost over 50 kg (110 lb) to get in shape to become "like a boxer".

== Soundtrack ==
On February 18, 2024, one song from the soundtrack, "Everything Comes in Time" (一切都来得及) was released alongside its music video. In the music video, Jia Ling is shown performing a duet with herself: before losing weight and after losing weight.

== Release ==
The film was released over the Lunar New Year holiday in China, grossing 1.6 billion yuan at the box office in its first four days of screening, and surpassing the 2.1 billion mark by 15 February, becoming the most successful movie in the Spring Festival season 2024. As of March 23, 2024, the cumulative box office was 3.456 billion.

Sony Pictures acquired international distribution rights for the film, which was then released in Singapore and Malaysia on March 21, 2024.

== Reception ==
On the review aggregator website Rotten Tomatoes, 82% of 11 critics' reviews are positive, with an average rating of 6.5/10.

== Awards and nominations ==
Year	Award	Category	Nominee	Result	Ref.
2024	Festival Film Bandung 2024	Praiseworthy Motivational Comedy Film-Praised Imported Film	YOLO	Won	
2025	43rd Hong Kong Film Awards	Best Asian Chinese Language Film	YOLO	Nominated	

== See also ==
- List of Chinese films of 2024
