= Jia Ling =

Chinese comedian, actress and director (born 1982)

- 贾玲
- Born: Jia Yuling (贾俞玲); April 29, 1982 (age 44); Xiangyang, Hubei, China
- Education: Central Academy of Drama

Comedy career
- Years active: 2003–present
- Genre: xiangsheng

Chinese name
- Traditional Chinese: 賈玲
- Simplified Chinese: 贾玲
Transcriptions
Standard Mandarin
- Hanyu Pinyin: Jiǎ Líng

Alternative Chinese name
- Traditional Chinese: 賈俞玲
- Simplified Chinese: 贾俞玲
Transcriptions
Standard Mandarin
- Hanyu Pinyin: Jiǎ Yùlíng

Jia Ling (Chinese: 贾玲, born Jia Yuling 贾俞玲; April 29, 1982) is a Chinese comedian, actress and filmmaker. She rose to fame as a crosstalk performer at the 2010 CCTV Spring Festival Gala and became a comedic staple of variety shows. In 2016, she co-founded her own entertainment company, Big Bowl Entertainment. Jia's directorial debut, Hi, Mom (2021), in which she also starred, made her the world's highest-grossing female director at the time, a title she held until Greta Gerwig's Barbie (2023). She followed this success with her second directorial film, YOLO (2024), which broke the box office record for Chinese New Year films.

== Early life ==
Jia was born in Yicheng County, Xiangyang, Hubei, as the younger of two daughters in a poor family of four. In 1994, she began studying acting at the Wuhan Art School, where she trained for two years.

In 2000, Jia applied unsuccessfully for the acting program at the Central Academy of Drama. She reapplied in 2001, this time for both the Drama Performance and Crosstalk (Xiangsheng) Performance majors. Although she was accepted into both, Jia ultimately enrolled in Crosstalk Performance, reportedly due to a misunderstanding during a confirmation phone call. Her mother, Li Huanying, whose strong accent confused the pronunciation of "drama" (戏剧; xìjù) and "comedy" (喜剧; xǐjù), inadvertently steered her toward crosstalk. Her mother died in a traffic accident later that year. Jia's older sister, Jia Dan, quit college to financially support her education.

After graduating from the Academy, Jia faced significant challenges as a female crosstalk performer in what was traditionally a male-dominated profession. Struggling to find performance opportunities, she took on various jobs to make a living, including part-time hosting, scriptwriting, and assisting other artists. During this time, her sister continued to support her financially, even finding her a more stable job as a highway tollbooth worker, which Jia declined in order to continue pursuing her passion.

== Career ==
=== Comedy ===
In 2003, Jia graduated from the Central Academy of Drama and participated in China's National Comic sketch Tournament (全国相声小品邀请赛), winning first place.

In 2005, she was admitted to the China Broadcasting Art Troupe (中国广播艺术团) and became a student under Feng Gong.

In 2006, she won second place in the third Cross Talk Competition hosted by the Central China Television.

In July 2009, she formed a comedy group named "New Laughter Inn" (新笑声客栈) with fellow comedian Zou Seng (邹僧), and established her own style of crosstalk nicknamed "cooltalk" (酷口相声).

In 2010, she made her television debut during the 2010 CCTV New Year's Gala with fellow comedian Bai Kainan (白凯南). Her segment, Gala Talk, was later voted the third-favourite performance of the night.

In 2012, She is one of the main guests invited by Hunan TV to appear in Season 1 of the Chinese version of Your Face Sounds Familiar, and continues to be one of the main guests for the next three seasons.

In 2014, she became one of the main cast of the improv comedy show Lok Street (喜乐街).

In 2015, she performed her sketch called Lok Street during the 2015 CCTV New Year's Gala. Later that year, she performed a controversial comedy sketch of Hua Mulan where Mulan was portrayed to be a silly, food-hungry and gluttonous girl that was duped into joining the army. An institute called Mulan Cultural Research Centre criticized her and asked for a public apology, but a lot of Chinese netizens supported her and believed that her performance should be acceptable. The authority and reliability of the Mulan Cultural Research Centre are still controversial, and many people asked for enhancing the regulation of this kind of institutes.

In 2016, she and her team took part in Season 1 of a television comedy competition show Comedy General Mobilization. Her sketch "Hello, Li Huanying" (which later evolved into her high-grossing film of the same name) was played in the first episode in the show, and won the first place in the episode.

In 2017, her company was the co-producer of the improv comedy TV show Happy Theater. She also took part in Season 2 of Comedy General Mobilization the same year and became one of the team leaders.

From 2018 to 2020, she was one of the main cast of the TV show Ace vs. Ace at Zhejiang TV.

In 2020, she was a main cast of the TV show Youth Periplous 2 at Zhejiang TV. She also ranked 93rd on Forbes China Celebrity 100 list.

=== Acting ===
From 2012, Jia started acting in support roles and guest appearances in various feature films and television series.

In 2021, her directorial debut and first leading role, the film Hi, Mom, made in memory of her late mother and adapted from her 2016 comedy sketch of the same name, was released during the Chinese Spring Festival. The film went on to become one of the highest-grossing film of all time in China and broke the box office record for Chinese New Year films.

In the second half of 2022, Jia disappeared completely from public eyes for over a year in making of her second directorial film, YOLO, a remake of the 2014 Japanese film 100 Yen Love. In preparation for the role, she first gained 20 kg (44 lb) of weight, and then lost over 50 kg (110 lb) through supervised boxing training. The film was released over the 2024 Spring Festival season.

== Filmography ==
=== Film ===
Year	English title	Chinese title	Role	Notes
2012	Just For Fun	就是闹着玩的	The wife	
2015	Surprise	万万没想到：西游篇	Jia'er	
2016	See You Tomorrow	摆渡人		
2018	Happiness Is Coming	幸福马上来		
2018	The Face of My Gene	祖宗十九代		
2020	My People, My Homeland	我和我的家乡	Jia Yuling	Segment: "The Way Home"
2021	Hi, Mom	你好，李焕英	Jia Xiaoling	Directorial debut
2021	Embrace Again	穿过寒冬拥抱你	Wu Ge	
2024	YOLO	热辣滚烫	Du Leying	Also director

=== Television series ===
Year	English title	Chinese title	Role	Notes
2013	Diors Man 2	屌丝男士2		
2013	Crazy Neighbors	邻居也疯狂	Aunt Li	
2013	The New Story of the Editorial Department	新编辑部故事	Aunt Dai	
2015	You are My Eyes	你是我的眼		
2016		百变五侠之我是大明星	Gong Zhu	
2016	Life is a Little Sweet	生活有点甜		
2016	Happy Detectives	欢喜密探	Chun Hua	
2017		六位帝狂玩		
2020	Happy Hunters	欢喜猎人	Jia Xiaoling	Also as co-producer

=== Variety Show ===
- Your Face Sounds Familiar (Chinese version) (2012-2014)
- Let's Laugh Together (2014)
- Star Chef S1 (2014)
- Lok Street S1 (2014)
- Lok Street S2 (2015)
- Real Hero (2015)
- Run For Time (2015)
- Comedy Class of Spring S1 (2015)
- Top Funny Comedian S1 (2015)
- Running Man (China) S4 (22 April 2016)
- Happy Camp (21 May 2016, 28 May 2016)
- Star Chefs arriving S3 (2016)
- Comedy General Mobilization (2016)
- Top Funny Comedian S2 (2016)
- Comedy Class of Spring S2 (2017)
- Running Man (China) S5 (12 May 2017, 19 May 2017)
- Ace VS Ace S2 (7 April 2017)
- Ace VS Ace S3 (2018)
- Ace VS Ace S4 (2019)
- Ace VS Ace S5 (2020)
- Youth Periplous 2 (2020)
- Ace VS Ace S6 (2021)
- Your Face Sounds Familiar (Chinese version) (2021)
