= Tao Piao Piao =

Tao Piao Piao or Taopiaopiao (Chinese: 淘票票; pinyin: Táo Piào Piào, lit: 'hunting for tickets') is an online movie ticket distributor and film promotion service.

Together, Taopiaopiao and its main rival Maoyan control approximately 80 percent of movie ticket sales in China.

Formerly known as Taobao Movie, the company was launched in 2014 in the city of Hangzhou, in China's Zhejiang Province.

A 2016 financing round led by investors from CDH Investments, Ant Financial Services Group, and Sina.com valued the company at approximately US$2 billion. In 2017, Alibaba Pictures raised its ownership stake to nearly 97 percent of the company's equity.

== See also ==
- Taobao
