= Wang Yibo discography =

Chinese Recording Artist

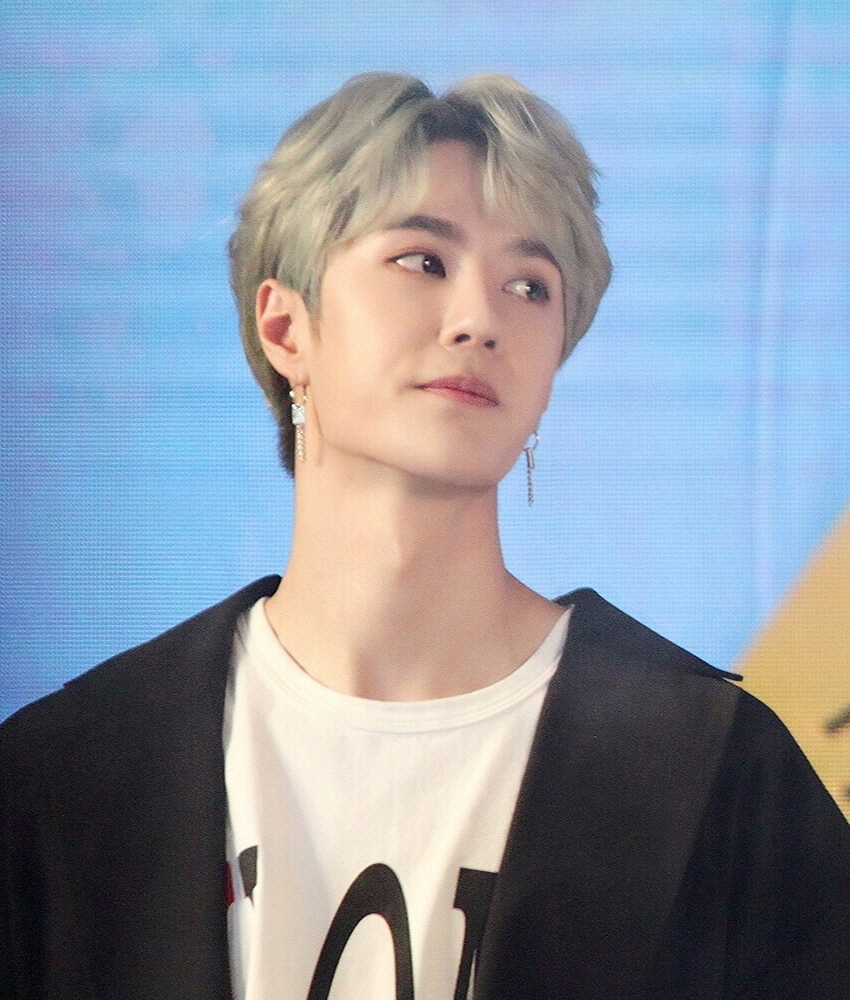
- Wang in 2018
- EPs: 1
- Singles: 9
- Soundtracks: 11
- Promotional singles: 25

This is the discography of Chinese recording artist Wang Yibo (Chinese: 王一博). In August 2017, Wang and Guan Xiaotong released a collaboration titled "Once Again", the theme song of the movie with same name. It marked Wang's debut as a solo singer. In November, Wang released the theme song "Just Dance" for the 4th Xuan Wu Dance Festival.

"No Sense" (2019) sold over 17 million digital copies and "My Rules" (2020) sold over 15 million digital copies on NetEase Music. Wang's first extended play, Bystander, was released on December 29, 2023, and sold over 1.28 million digital copies in China.

== Extended plays ==
List of extended plays, with details and sales
Title	Album details	Sales
Bystander (旁观者)	Released: December 29, 2023; Label: Yuehua Entertainment; Formats: Digital download, streaming; Track list: 1. 旁观者 (Bystander); 2. 万物可爱 (Everything Is Lovely)	CHN: 1,300,000 (dl.)

== Singles ==
=== As lead artist ===
List of singles as lead artist, with selected chart positions and sales
Title	Year	Peak chart positions			Sales	Album
Title	Year	CHN	JPN Dig.	US World	Sales	Album
"Fire"	2019	—	—	—	CHN: 1,267,781	Non-album singles
"Lucky"	2019	—	—	—	CHN: 659,955	Non-album singles
"No Sense" (无感)	2019	—	—	—	CHN: 17,585,162	Non-album singles
"My Rules" (我的世界守则)	2020	—	—	14	CHN: 15,485,428	Non-album singles
"Stand Up" (廿)	2021	1	84	—		Non-album singles
"Like the Sunshine" (像阳光那样)	2022	2	—	—	CHN: 2,475,123	Non-album singles
"Bystander" (旁观者)	2023		—	—		Bystander (旁观者)
"Everything Is Lovely" (万物可爱)	2023		—	—		Bystander (旁观者)
"I AM NOT HERE" (我在)	2024		—	—		Non-album singles
"—" denotes releases that did not chart or were not released in that region.

== Soundtrack appearances ==
List of soundtrack appearances, with selected chart positions and sales
Title	Year	Peak chart positions	Sales	Album
Title	Year	CHN	Sales	Album
"Once Again" (二次初恋) (with Guan Xiaotong)	2017	—	—N/a	Once Again OST
"The Shadow of the Shark" (鲨影) (with Cheng Xiao)	2018	—	—N/a	The Meg OST
"Heart Affairs of the Youth" (少年心事)	2018	78	—N/a	Crystal Sky of Yesterday OST
"Burning Adventure" (最燃的冒险)	2019	23	—N/a	Gank Your Heart OST
"Saying Sword" (说剑)	2019	78	—N/a	Moonlight Blade OST
"Unrestrained" (无羁) (with Xiao Zhan)	2019	1	—N/a	The Untamed OST
"Unrestrained" (无羁) (Solo version)	2019	—	—N/a	The Untamed OST
"Won't Forget" (不忘)	2019	3	—N/a	The Untamed OST
"Dear Mom" (给妈咪)	2020	11	—N/a	Lost in Russia OST
"First Rays" (熹微)	2020	2	CHN: 2,157,553	Legend of Fei OST
"Wu Ming" (无名)	2023	27	—N/a	Hidden Blade OST

== Promotional singles ==
List of promotional singles, showing year released
Title	Year	Notes
"Just Dance"	2017	Theme song of 4th Xuan Wu Festival
"With You By My Side" (有你在身边)	2020	Charity song for COVID-19 pandemic
"We Stay Together" (因为我们在一起)	2020	Charity song for COVID-19 pandemic
"So Young So Flowering" (青春的模样)	2021	Theme song of the special show You at 28 (28 岁的你)
"Youth Comes in Time" (青春恰时来)	2021	Youth song for the 14th China's Five-Year Plan
"Hot Blood" (热血今朝)	2021	Theme song of the documentary movie Resist the U.S. and Defend Our Country
"Airdrop Plan" (空投计划)	2021	Theme song of the PUBG Airdrop Carnival 2021
"Burn It All Down" (不可阻挡) (Wang Yibo remix)	2021	Theme Song of the 2021 League of Legends World Finals
"Extraordinary in the Ordinary" (平凡中的不平凡)	2021	Theme song of micro movie Original Aspiration (初心)
"Starlight of Mountains and Rivers" (山河星光)	2021	Commemorating song for the 2021 Chinese National Day
"Speak for Me" (替我诉说)	2022	Theme song of the 2022 Chinese People's Police Day
"Flying Winter Dream" (冬梦之约)	2022	The theme song of the 100 Days to the Beijing Winter Olympics
"Youth Universe" (青春宇宙)	2022	Celebrating the 100th Anniversary of the Communist Youth League of China
"Hello Hong Kong" (你好香港)	2022	Celebrating the 25th anniversary of Hong Kong's return
"Above the clouds" (云端)	2022	Movie 《Born to Fly》promotional song
"Blazing dream" (炙热的梦)	2022	New Song for National Firefighter's Day
"The Light Chaser" (追光的人)	2022	Chinese literary and art volunteers pay tribute to the promotional song of the special program
"Burning" (燃)	2023	Hangzhou Asian Games Torch Relay Theme Song
"Vibrant Shanghai" (躍動上海)	2024	Olympic Qualifier Series Shanghai Theme Song
"Dragon Soar" (龙腾)	2024	Paris 2024 Olympic x Cheer Song for Chinese Athletes
"The sky is high and the sea is vast" (天高海濶)	2024	"Happy Run.Passionate youth" National Youth Sunshine Sports Theme Song
"Letters of blessing" (展信安)	2024	Song to celebrate the 75th anniversary of the founding of the China
"Light Up Asia" (点亮亚洲)	2025	9th Asian Winter Games Harbin 2025 Opening Ceremony Theme Song
"Youth Pathfinder" (青春探路者)	2025	CCTV 2025 May 4 Youth Day Special Program Theme Song
"Wish Love" (愿爱)	2025	《沿着边境看中国》 Theme song
"Remember this moment"(共铭此刻)	2025	Special Project Songs for the 80th Anniversary of the Victory in the War of Resistance Against Japan
"With Overwhelming Momentum"(气势如虹)	2025	Song of the 15th National Games
