= List of Stax products =

The following is a list of Stax products, items manufactured by Stax Ltd.

== Headphones ==
=== Currently in production ===
Earspeaker Model No.	Release year	Bias Type	Notes
SR-003MK2	2012	Pro, 5-pin	In-Ear
SR-X1	2024	Pro, 5-pin	
SR-X9000	2021	Pro, 5-pin	Omega series, Current Flagship
SR-009S	2018	Pro, 5-pin	Omega series
SR-007Mk2 / SR-007A	2007	Pro, 5-pin	Omega series
SR-L300	2016	Pro, 5-pin	Lambda series
SR-L700MK2	2019	Pro, 5-pin	Lambda series
SR-L500MK2	2019	Pro, 5 Pin	Lambda series

=== Discontinued ===
Earspeaker Model No.	Release year	Bias Type	Notes
SR-1	1960	Normal, 6-pin	
SR-2	1968	Normal, 6-pin	
SR-3	1968	Normal, 6-pin	
SR-X	1970	Normal, 6-pin	
SR-3 New	1971	Normal, 6-pin	
SR-X/MK2	1972	Normal, 6-pin	
SR-5	1975	Normal, 6-pin	
SR-X/MK3	1975	Normal, 6-pin	
SR-40	1975	Electret	
SR-60	1975	Electret	
SR-Sigma	1977	Normal, 6-pin	Sigma series
SR-50	1979	Electret	Closed back
SR-Lambda	1979	Normal, 6-pin	Lambda series
SR-30	1982	Electret	
SR-34	1982	Electret	SR-30 Electret Earspeakers & SRD-4 Adaptor
SR-80	1982	Electret	
SR-5N / SR-5NB	1982	Normal, 6-pin	
SR-Lambda Pro	1982	Pro, 5-pin	Lambda series
SR-Gamma	1985	Normal, 6-pin	Gamma series
SR-Gamma Pro	1985	Pro, 5-pin	Gamma series
SR-X/MK3 Pro	1985	Pro, 5-pin	
SR-Sigma Pro	1987	Pro, 5-pin	Sigma series
SR-Lambda Signature	1987	Pro, 5-pin	Lambda series
SR-Alpha Pro Excellent	1989	Pro, 5-pin	Alpha series
SR-80 Pro	1989	Electret	
SR-30 Pro	1989	Electret	
SR-Lambda Spirit	1992	Pro, 5-pin	Lambda series
SR-Lambda Pro Classic	1993	Pro, 5-pin	Lambda series
SR-Omega	1993	Pro, 5-pin	Omega series
SR-Lambda Nova Basic	1994	Pro, 5-pin	Lambda series
SR-Lambda Nova Classic	1994	Pro, 5-pin	Lambda series
SR-Lambda Nova Signature	1994	Pro, 5-pin	Lambda series
SR-001	1995	Pro, special 6-pin	In-Ear portable
SR-003	1997	Pro, 5-pin	In-Ear
SR-001 MK2	1997	Pro, special 6-pin	In-ear portable
SR-007 / SR-007BL	1998	Pro, 5-pin	Omega series
SR-202 Basic	1999	Pro, 5-pin	Lambda series
SR-303 Classic	1999	Pro, 5-pin	Lambda series
SR-404 Signature	1999	Pro, 5-pin	Lambda series
4070	2001	Pro, 5-pin	Closed back
SR-404 Limited	2009	Pro, 5-pin	Lambda series, Limited Edition, 1,000 units
SR-207	2010	Pro, 5-pin	Lambda series
SR-307	2010	Pro, 5-pin	Lambda series
SR-407	2010	Pro, 5-pin	Lambda series
SR-507	2010	Pro, 5-pin	Lambda series
SR-002	2012	Pro, special 6-pin	In-Ear portable
SR-L700	2015	Pro, 5-pin	Lambda series
SR-L500	2015	Pro, 5 Pin	Lambda series
SR-L300 Limited	2018	Pro, 5-pin	Lambda series, Limited Edition, 800 units
SR-009	2011	Pro, 5-pin	Omega series

== Headphone amplifiers ==
=== Currently in production ===
Stax currently produces six solid-state and three hybrid vacuum-tube/solid-state hybrid earspeaker driver units.

Driver Unit Model No.	Release year	Output Voltage (RMS)	Inputs	Outputs	Notes
SRM-001	1995	240 V	1x Miniplug	1x Pro Bias, Special 6 Pin	Solid state, battery operated for portable use
SRM-252S	2010	280 V	1x RCA	1x Pro Bias, RCA Loop Out	Solid State
SRM-T8000	2017	470 V	1x Balanced XLR, 2x RCA	2x Pro Bias, RCA Loop Out	Vacuum tube / Solid state hybrid, Current Flagship
SRM-D10	2018	200 V	1x micro USB, 1x 1/8" analog	1x Pro Bias	Solid state, with DAC
SRM-D50	2018	400 V	1x USB B, 1x TOSLINK, 1x S/PDIF, 1x RCA	1x Pro Bias	Solid state, with DAC
SRM-700T	2020	340 V	1x Balanced XLR, 1x RCA	2x Pro Bias, RCA Loop Out	Vacuum tube (2x 6SN7) / Solid state hybrid
SRM-700S	2020	450 V	1x Balanced XLR, 1x RCA	2x Pro Bias, RCA Loop Out	Solid state
SRM-500T	2021	300 V	1x Balanced XLR, 1x RCA	2x Pro Bias, RCA Loop Out	Vacuum tube (2x 6FQ7 / 6CG7) / Solid state hybrid
SRM-400S	2021	400 V	1x Balanced XLR, 1x RCA	2x Pro Bias, RCA Loop Out	Solid state

=== Discontinued ===
Driver Unit Model No.	Release year	Output Voltage (RMS)	Inputs	Outputs	Notes
SRA-4S / SRA-6S	1960			2x Normal Bias	Vacuum tube
SRA-7S	1966			2x Normal Bias	Vacuum tube
SRA-8S	1967	350 V		2x Normal Bias	Vacuum tube
SRA-3S	1968	279 V		2x Normal Bias	Vacuum tube / Solid state hybrid
SRA-10S	1974			2x Normal Bias	Solid state
SRA-12S	1977	350 V	5x RCA	2x Normal Bias, 2x RCA	Solid state
SRM-1	1979	370 V	1x RCA,	2x Normal Bias	Solid state
SRM-1 Pro	1981	370 V	1x RCA,	1x Pro Bias, 1x Normal Bias, 1x RCA loop out	Solid state
SRM-1/MK2 Pro	1982	370 V	1x RCA	1x Pro Bias, 1x Normal Bias, 1x RCA loop out	Solid state
SRA-14S	1985	400 V		1x Pro Bias, 1x Normal Bias	Solid state
SRM-T1	1987	300 V	2x RCA	2x Pro Bias, 1x Normal Bias, 1x RCA loop out	Vacuum tube (2x 6FQ7/6CG7) / Solid state hybrid
SRM-1/Mk-2 PP	1990	370 V	1x RCA	2x Pro Bias, 1x RCA loop out	Solid state
SRM-X Pro	1990	280 V	1x miniplug, 1x RCA	1x Pro Bias, 1x Normal Bias	Solid state, Portable type
SRM-T1S	1993	300 V	1x Balanced XLR, 2x RCA	2x Pro Bias, 1x Normal Bias, 1x RCA loop out	Vacuum tube (2x 6FQ7/6CG7) / Solid state hybrid
SRM-3	1994	300 V	1x RCA	2x Pro Bias, 1x RCA loop out	Solid state
SRM-T1W	1994	300 V	1x Balanced XLR, 2x RCA	2x Pro Bias (adjustable 480–580 V), 1x Normal Bias	Vacuum tube (2x 6FQ7/6CG7) / Solid state hybrid
SRM-T2	1994	630 V	1x Balanced XLR, 2x RCA	2x Pro Bias	Vacuum tube / Solid state hybrid
SRM-Xh	1992	280 V	1x RCA	1x Pro Bias	Solid state
SRM-212	1999	280 V	1x RCA	1x Pro Bias	Solid state
SRM-252A/SRM-252II	2006	280 V	1x RCA	1x Pro Bias, RCA Loop Out	Solid State
SRM-313	1999	350 V	1x RCA	1x Pro Bias, 1x Normal Bias, 1x RCA loop out	Solid state
SRM-006t	1999	300 V	1x Balanced XLR, 2x RCA	2x Pro Bias, 1x Normal Bias (or Pro Bias), RCA Loop Out	Vacuum tube (2x 6FQ7/6CG7) / Solid state hybrid
SRM-007t	1998	340 V	1x Balanced XLR, 2x RCA	2x Pro Bias, 1x Normal Bias (or Pro Bias), RCA Loop Out	Vacuum tube (4x 6FQ7/6CG7) / Solid state hybrid
SRM-717	2000	450 V	1x Balanced XLR, 1x RCA	2x Pro Bias, RCA Loop Out	Solid state
SRM-323A / SRM-323II	2006	400 V	2x RCA	2x Pro Bias, RCA Loop Out	Solid state
SRM-006tA / SRM-006tII	2006	300 V	1x Balanced XLR, 2x RCA	2x Pro Bias, RCA Loop Out	Vacuum tube (2x 6FQ7/6CG7) / Solid state hybrid
SRM-727A	2006	450 V	1x Balanced XLR, 2x RCA	2x Pro Bias, RCA Loop Out	Solid state
SRM-727II	2007	450 V	1x Balanced XLR, 1x RCA	2x Pro Bias, RCA Loop Out	Solid state
SRM-600 Limited	2009	340 V	1x Balanced XLR, 3x RCA	2x Pro Bias, RCA Loop Out	Vacuum tube (2x ECC99) / Solid state hybrid, Limited Edition, 600 units
SRM-323S	2010	400 V	2x RCA	2x Pro Bias, RCA Loop Out	Solid state
SRM-353XBK	2018	400 V	1 Balanced XLR, 2x RCA	2x Pro Bias, RCA Loop Out	Solid state, Limited Edition, 300 units
SRM-006tS	2010	300 V	1x Balanced XLR, 2x RCA	2x Pro Bias, RCA Loop Out	Vacuum tube (2x 6FQ7/6CG7)
SRM-007tA / SRM-007tII	2006	340 V	1x Balanced XLR, 3x RCA	2x Pro Bias, RCA Loop Out	Vacuum tube (4x 6FQ7/6CG7) / Solid state hybrid
SRM-300 / SRM-310	2003	350 V	1x RCA	2x Pro Bias, RCA Loop Out	Solid state, styled as an earspeaker stand
SRM-353X	2015	400 V	1 Balanced XLR, 2x RCA	2x Pro Bias, RCA Loop Out	Solid state

== Amplifier adapters ==
Stax currently does not produce any amplifier adapters.

Adapter Unit Model No.	Release year	Outputs	Notes
SRD-1	1960	2x Normal Bias	
SRD-2	1960	2x Normal Bias	
SRD-3	1965	2x Normal Bias	
SRD-5	1968	2x Normal Bias	
SRD-7	1971	2x Normal Bias	
SRD-6	1973	1x Normal Bias	
SRD-4	1975	Electret	
SRD-6SB	1978	1x Normal Bias	Self-Bias
SRD-7SB	1979	2x Normal Bias	Self Bias
SRD-X	1979	1x Normal Bias	1/4" male plug input on integral coiled cord, no RCA. Portable, uses eight C cell batteries or AC adapter.
SRD-7/Pro	1982-83	2x Pro Bias	
SRD-7SB/MK2	1985	1x Pro Bias, 1x Normal Bias	
SRD-X/Pro	1986	1x Pro Bias, 1x Normal Bias	RCA input
SRD-P	1986	2x Electret/Pro Bias	Both RCA and 1/8"(3.5 mm) inputs. Portable, uses eight C cell batteries or AC adapter.

== Systems (headphone + driver) ==
System Model no.	Earspeaker Unit Model no.	Driver Unit Model No.	Notes
SRS-002	SR-002	SRM-002	In-Ear. Battery operated for portable use.
SRS-005	SR-003	SRM-212	In-Ear.
SRS-005S Mk2	SR-003mk2	SRM-252S	In-Ear.
SRS-2050	SR-202	SRM-252	Basic System
SRS-2170	SR-207	SRM-252S	Basic System
SRS-3170	SR-307	SRM-323S	
SRS-4170	SR-407	SRM-006tS	
SRS-3100	SR-L300	SRM-252S	
SRS-5100	SR-L500	SRM-353X	

== Electrostatic loudspeakers (discontinued) ==
- ELS-4A - Electrostatic loudspeakers, 1976
- ELS-6A - Electrostatic loudspeakers, 1976
- ELS-F81 - Electrostatic loudspeaker, 1981
- ESTA-4U - Electrostatic loudspeaker, 1982 (self-biasing)
- EK-1 - Kit electrostatic speaker, 1983
- ELS-F83 - Electrostatic loudspeaker, 1983
- ESTA-4U Extra - Electrostatic loudspeaker, 1983 (self-biasing)
- EK-1/MK2 - Electrostatic loudspeaker, 1984
- ELS-F81 NEW - Electrostatic loudspeaker, 1984
- ELS-8X BB - Electrostatic loudspeaker, 1987 (battery-biased)
- ELS-6X - Electrostatic loudspeaker, 1988
- ELS-8X - Electrostatic loudspeaker, 1988
- ELS-F81X - Electrostatic loudspeaker, 1988
- CLASS Model2 - Electrostatic loudspeaker, 1992

== Tonearms ==
- UA-3 - Tonearm
- UA-3N - Tonearm
- UA-3NL -Tonearm
- UA-7 - Tonearm
- UA-70 - Tonearm
- UA-7N - Tonearm
- UA-70N - Tonearm
- UA-7cf - Tonearm
- UA-9N - Tonearm
- UA-90N - Tonearm
- UA-9 - Tonearm
- UA-90 - Tonearm

== Other audio products ==
- CPY - Electrostatic phono cartridge
- CPY-MK2 - Electrostatic phono cartridge
- ECP-1 - Equalizer/adapter for Stax electrostatic photo cartridges
- ED-1 Monitor - Equalizer for SR-Lambda/Professional, 1988
- ED-1 Signature - Diffuse field equalizer for SR-Lambda Signature, 1990
- DAC-X1T - Digital-to-analogue converter, 1989
- DAC-TALENT - Digital-to-analogue converter, 1990
- DA-300 - Speaker amplifier
- DA-80 - Speaker amplifier
- CDP Quattro - CD player, 1986
- CDP Quattro 2 - CD player, 1988

== Accessories ==
- SRE-15/44 (5 meter) earspeaker cable extension cord (discontinued)
- SRE-750 or SRE-950S (5 meter) and SRE-725 or SRE-925S (2.5 meter), earspeaker extension cords
- HPS-2, wooden earspeaker stand
- HPS-1, wooden and plastic earspeaker stand (discontinued)
- CPC-1, protective cover
