= Ma Tai =

Ma Tai may refer to:

- Tzi Ma or Ma Tai, Hong Kong actor
- Matt William Knowles or Ma Tai, China-based American actor
