= Asura (2018 film) =

- Traditional Chinese: 阿修羅
- Simplified Chinese: 阿修罗
- Literal meaning: Asura
- Hanyu Pinyin: Āxiūluō
- Directed by: Peng Zhang
- Written by: Kirk Caouette
- Screenplay by: Zhenjian Yang; Adam Chanzit
- Produced by: Zhenjian Yang
- Starring: Leo Wu; Carina Lau; Tony Leung Ka-fai
- Cinematography: Patrick Murguia
- Edited by: Tommy Aagaard
- Music by: Trevor Morris
- Production companies: Alibaba Pictures; Zhenjian Film Studio; Ningxia Film Group
- Release date: July 13, 2018
- Running time: 141 minutes
- Country: China
- Language: Mandarin
- Budget: $113.5 million
- Box office: $7.1 million

Asura is a Chinese epic fantasy film based on Buddhist mythology. It is the directorial debut of Peng Zhang. It was released on 13 July 2018 and was withdrawn on 15 July 2018. The film, which was reportedly costing RMB 750 million (US$113 million), was withdrawn from theaters after only three days of release. It was widely considered by the media for being used for money laundering.

== Synopsis ==
The story is set in Asura, the dimension of pure desire according to ancient Buddhist mythology. The mythical realm is threatened by a coup from a lower heavenly kingdom and the story follows from there.

== Cast ==
- Leo Wu as Ruyi
- Carina Lau as Asura King, Head of Cunning
- Tony Leung Ka-fai as Asura King, Head of Desire
- Ming Dao as Doctor
- Zhang Yishang as Hua
- Matt William Knowles as Rawa
- Damien Walters
- Umar Khan as Jeeon
- Caitlin Dechelle
- Paul Philip Clark
- Gigi Feshold
- Augustus Du Guy
- Alexander J. Guy
- Ron Smoorenburg
- Jeannine Derbez
- Joseph Castillo
- Shakirudeen Alade as Dolo
- Bonetics Junior

== Production ==
The film is directed by renowned Hollywood stunt coordinator Peng Zhang (The Twilight Saga, Ant-Man) and produced by Alibaba Pictures. The film's screenplay is written by Zhenjian Yang (Painted Skin: The Resurrection). Oscar winner Ngila Dickson (The Lord of the Rings franchise) serves as the costume designer, while Martín Hernandez (The Revenant, Birdman) serves as the audio director. Charlie Iturriaga (Deadpool, Furious 7, The Social Network) is in charge of the visual effects.

=== Filming ===
Asura is shot in seven locations across China, including Ningxia Hui Autonomous Region, the Qinghai-Tibet Plateau and the city of Liupanshui in Guizhou Province.

== Reception ==
=== Box office ===
Asura earned a disappointing 49 million yuan ($7.3 million U.S.) in its opening weekend and was pulled from cinemas after a statement on social media; the statement gave no explanation for the move. However, a representative from Zhenjian Film, which is credited as lead producer, later told Chinese news site Sina: "This decision was made not only because of the bad box office. We plan to make some changes to the film and release it again." Despite these statements, the film has never been exhibited or marketed anywhere again.
