= Luoyang (TV series) =

Chinese television series

- Also known as: Wind Rises in Luoyang 风起洛阳 洛阳
- Genre: Costume, Mystery
- Based on: Luoyang (洛阳) by Ma Boyong
- Directed by: Xie Ze
- Starring: Huang Xuan; Wang Yibo; Victoria Song
- Composer: Qing Mei
- Country of origin: China
- Original language: Mandarin
- No. of episodes: 39

Production
- Running time: 40 mins
- Production companies: iQIYI; Liu Bai Entertainment

Original release
- Network: iQIYI
- Release: December 1 – December 29, 2021

Luoyang (Chinese: 风起洛阳) is a 2021 Chinese costume and mystery television series, starring Huang Xuan, Wang Yibo, and Victoria Song. The story revolves around three people from different classes uniting together to work out a mysterious case in Luoyang under the Zhou dynasty. As they continue to dig into the case and search for the truth, they discover a more complicated conspiracy.

== Cast ==
=== Main ===
- Huang Xuan as Gao Bingzhu (born in Buliangjing City and once served as the Deputy Marshal of Buliang)
- Wang Yibo as Baili Hongyi (the second son of the Minister of Works and the best gourmet in Luoyang)
- Victoria Song as Wu Siyue (a palace guard born as a collateral descendant of the Wu Clan)

=== Supporting ===
- Song Yi as Liu Ran (Baili Hongyi's wife)
- Yong Mei as Empress Wu Zetian
- Liu Duan Duan as Prince Dongchuan
- Zhang Duo as Wu Youjue
- Zhang Li as Yao Niang
- Zhang Xilin as Liu Xiang
- Gao Shuguang as Baili Yan
- Ning Wentong as Wu Shenxing
- Shi Yu as Liu Shi
- Feng Hui as Gao Sheng

== Plot ==
Under the Wu Zhou dynasty, the act of informing on others is highly encouraged by the Empress. However, some informants are murdered upon their arrival to Luoyang, which prompts Wu Siyue to investigate. As Gao Bingzhu is searching for the murderer who killed his friends 5 years ago, he becomes a suspect in another murder case. He then seeks help from Baili Hongyi, who wants to find out the truth about his father being poisoned. While trying to uncover the truth, Wu Siyue ends up meeting both Gao and Baili Hongyi. As the three of them team up and discover new clues, they are led to believe that these cases are connected and related to Four Season Clan – a rebellious organization consisting of professional killers. The clues also lead Gao to the culprit behind the murder of his friends – Yaoniang, who has been Gao's confidant for years and kills herself upon their meeting.

Gao then joins Lianfang (lit. 'Joint Corps', an intelligence agency governed by Prince Dongchuan) and helps the organization detect a long-term spy. After exhaustive investigation and life-threatening dangers, the trio finds out that the Four Season Clan is creating high explosive to destroy Tiantang tower and simultaneously assassinate the Empress on the Lighting Festival. Due to Baili Hongyi's decoding efforts, they are able to stop the explosions in time. Nevertheless, Hanjia granary suddenly blows up, which leads to starvations and riots across Luoyang. As Prince Dongchuan is stabbed and severely wounded, Wu Youjue is promoted to become Minister of Lianfang. The Four Season Clan, now under Baili Kuanren's sole leadership, gifts rice to Luoyang's residents to raise its reputation. Baili Kuanren was then arrested while attending Wu Youjue's speech. As a result, Wu Youjue is praised and rewarded by the Empress. Wu Siyue accidentally finds out that her brother Wu Youjue has been manipulated Four Season Clan all along. This, with the abduction of Princess Yongchuan Li Lu and a recently planned bomb attack, is all Wu Youjue's plot to usurp the crown prince. However, Gao Bingzhu thwarted his plan beforehand with the help of Buliangjing's residents. Wu Youjue survived a failed assassination attempted by Liu Shi, but Wu Siyue was shot and died. The exclusion order on Buliangjing ghetto is lifted, which made Gao's promise to the residents come true.

== Production ==
The series began filming in November 2020, and wrapped up in March 2021.
