= Exploring the Unknown with Wang Yibo Season 2 =

Chinese Documentary Series

- Exploring the Unknown with Wang Yibo Season 2
- Also known as: Chinese: 探索新境·寻找王一博 - 第二季
- Genre: Documentary; Reality; Adventure
- Created by: Warner Bros. Discovery Group, Discovery
- Starring: Wang Yibo; James Ryder Stroud
- Country of origin: China
- Original language: Mandarin、English
- No. of seasons: 2
- No. of episodes: 14

Production
- Running time: approx. 38 minutes

Original release
- Network: Tencent Video
- Release: 28 November 2025 – 11 January 2026

Exploring the Unknown with Wang Yibo Season 2 (Chinese: 探索新境第二季; pinyin: tàn suǒ xīn jìng . xún zhǎo wáng yī bó) is an outdoor exploration documentary program initiated by Wang Yibo to continue the first season, co-produced by Tencent Video and Warner Bros. Discovery Group, Discovery created by the international production team of Discovery Channel, and this Season is filmed in North America and challenge famous Rock climbing spots. Wang Yibo invited the experienced Jimmy Chin as a climbing instructor, and James Ryder Stroud (Shi Rid) as a climbing partner to join the exploration lineup. This season will try more challenges of local North American culture, unlocking multiple challenges such as flat belt walking in a 100-meter canyon, logging sports that emphasize both strength and skill, and wake surfing . The film will be launched on Tencent Video every Friday and Saturday at 11 a.m. from November 28, 2025. In May 2026, the season 2 secured the ″Bronze Telly″ for Documentary Series at ″the 47th Annual Telly Awards″, following in the footsteps of its first season which won a ″Gold Telly″ last year. It premiered on Discovery Channel and HBO Max overseas on July 28.

== Overview ==
Wang Yibo's confused exploration in the first season to the firm cultivation of rock climbing in the second season is that the sport of rock climbing has made him find the feeling of "living" and has also clarified the direction of his life. This season, he tried a variety of climbing types such as Leading, Aid climbing, and deep-water bouldering, preferring traditional climbing. During this journey, fresh experiences such as sea fishing, wake surfing, and mountain biking have also opened up more possibilities for him, especially fishing, which has quietly become his new hobby. These profound memories make this journey full of rewards and a sense of accomplishment. Wang Yibo said that rock climbing is a way to find oneself, constantly explore new worlds, and experience the limits of life. He will continue to enjoy the realism and happiness brought by rock climbing in the future, continue to study the sports he loves, and let more people feel the charm of rock climbing and the outdoors.

== Episodes ==
EP01 Between the Cracks (Part 1)
Wang Yibo started the "North American Climbing Journey" with climbing instructor Jimmy Chin and rock climbing partner Ryder Stroud (Shi Rid), the first phase of challenging the desert crack climbing in Indian Creek, 100-meter altitude flat belt, adventure experience, coexistence with fear, and completing the first step.

- Climbing location: Red Rock Canyon, Indian Creek, Utah, USA
- Challenge: Crack climbing + high-altitude Slacklining
- Route: Coco's Boathouse (Grade : Intermediate 5.10a)

EP02 Between the Cracks (Part 2)
Wang Yibo and his climbing partner Shi Rade experienced climbing Castleton Tower together. Castleton Tower is a popular subject for its classic rock climbing routes, Castleton Tower is one of the most iconic desert sandstone towers in North America, with many climbing routes, including the classic one to the north. It can be accessed by a trail that begins south of the tower at a primitive camp ground. Rock climbing instructor Jimmy Chin said that this experience will be a good opportunity for Wang Yibo to come into contact with multiple crack climbs, which will also be a difficult challenge for him.

- Climbing location: Castleton Tower, Castle Valley, near Moab, Utah, USA
- Challenge : Crack climbing + Mountain biking
- Route:

1. North Wall Stage 1 (Grade: Advanced 5.11a)
2. North Wall Stage 2 (Grade: Intermediate 5.10c)
3. North Wall Stage 3 (Grade: Intermediate 5.10a)

EP03 Heading to the Forest Sea (Part 1)
Wang Yibo visited Squamish, a world-class granite climbing destination. Where he took on the challenge of aid climbing and experienced activities such as axe throwing and logrolling .

- Climbing location: Squamish, British Columbia, Canada
- Challenge: AID climbing + Traditional logging + Axe throwing + Logrolling (sport)
- Route:

1. Bug House Heights (Grade: Advanced 5.10d)
2. Jacob's Ladder (Zombie Roof, Grade: Expert 5.12b)

EP04 Heading to the Forest (Part 2)
Wang Yibo challenges himself with aid climbing on the granite cliffs that rock climbers dream of. This time, relying on different sized plugs, he must climb safely on the rock face; to trust it, one must understand it. He also experiences logging culture, axe throwing, and log rolling in water, feeling the joy of traditional competitive activities.

- Climbing location: Mount Garibaldi Squamish, British Columbia, Canada
- Challenge: Mechanical climbing (French free climbing + Lying on portaledge + orthopedic + Disc Golf)
- Route:

1. Split-tailed Beaver (Grade: Intermediate 5.10b)
2. Shock Wall (this route development in the 1960s, divided into three sections, Grade: advanced 5.10d)

EP05 Deep Sea Boundaries (Part 1)
Wang Yibo experienced Deep-water soloing (DWS) for the first time in Howe Bay, Canada. This refers to bouldering on a rock wall overlooking deep water without the use of ropes, belay devices, or any other protective gear. If the climber falls, they can fall directly into the water as a cushion. It is an extremely exciting and free way of climbing.

- Climbing location: Howe Bay, Cheakamus River, Squamish, British Columbia, Canada
- Challenge: Deep water bouldering + Deepwater Trolling (fishing)
- Route : Gambier Island

1. Stage 1: (Grade: Intermediate 5.9)
2. Stage 2: (Grade: Intermediate 5.10a)
3. Stage 3: (Grade: Intermediate 5.10b)

EP06 Deep Sea Boundaries (Part 2)
After experiencing whitewater paddleboarding on the Cheakamus River and outdoor bouldering in the forest, Wang Yibo climbs a new deepwater bouldering route for the first time, after his first ascent of the deep-water boulder, he spotted a seal and named his first ascent route "Seal in the Sun"(陽光下的海豹).

- Climbing location: Lions Bay, Cheakamus River Squamish, British Columbia, Canada
- Challenge: Deep water soloing + White Water Standup paddleboarding
- Route : Pirate (Left Line) (Grade: Advanced 5.11c)

EP07 Beyond Passion (Part 1)
Wang Yibo needs to recharge to better face new challenges! He experiences outdoor activities like clam digging in the mudflats and overnight tree climbing in a hammock on Lopez Island, feeling what he calls "the first kind of joy."

- Climbing Location: Anacortes Ferry Terminal,San Juan Islands, Lopez Island, Washington, USA
- Challenge: Tree climbing, clam digging
- Route: Douglas Fir (approx. 46m), over 500 years old (Climbing Grade: 5.9 YDS)

EP08 Beyond Passion (Part 2)
Wang Yibo observes dolphins, sea lions, and orcas in the sea, and experiences wakeboarding in Portland. Amidst the sound of the tides, he searches for a balance between his passion and life. His new climb on the beach is named "Dried Crab." He says: "Turning your passion into your career is a very happy thing."

- Climbing Locations: Lopez Island, Washington, USA; Willamette Park, Portland, Oregon
- Challenge: Wakeboarding + Kayak fishing
- Route: Dried Crab (Grade : 5.10a+)

EP09 The Path of Pioneers (Part 1)
Wang Yibo and his climbing partner, Ryder Stroud, arrive in Wyoming, experiencing the charm of cowboy culture in Jackson Hole; they meet up with climbing instructor Jimmy Chin to begin a new round of rock climbing challenges, preparing for their final challenge at Yosemite.

- Climbing location: Yellowstone National Park, Jackson Hole, Wyoming, USA
- Challenge: Lead Climbing
- Route : Carter's Rib (Grade : Intermediate 5.10a)

EP10 The Path of Pioneers (Part 2)
Wang Yibo's best way to relieve fatigue is to feel nature, fish, and enjoy delicious food, while constantly growing and becoming a better version of himself through exploring new climbing routes.

- Climbing Location: Spire, Wyoming, USA
- Challenge: Top-rope climbing
- Route Name: Aquatofana (Grade: Advanced 5.11a)

EP11 Straight to the summit (Part 1)
Wang Yibo takes on the ultimate challenge in Yosemite. While tackling the second pitch of Liberty Cap, continuous hand-jamming severely exhausted his physical strength. At a moment when lead climbing became nearly impossible to sustain, he decisively switched to "French Free" climbing, using the assistance of protection gear (nuts/cams) to successfully reach the resting point. Big Wall climbing typically refers to routes hundreds of meters long that require multi-pitch climbing and can take several days to complete, unlike short routes that can be finished in a single day.

- Climbing Location: Yosemite, California, USA
- Challenges: Integrated Climbing Mode + Big wall climbing (The Center of the Climbing Universe)
- Route Name: Liberty Cap, Southwest Face, Pitch 2: Lead Climbing (Grade: Intermediate 5.10c)

EP12 Straight to the summit (Part 2)
Wang Yibo reached the summit of Yosemite's ultimate big wall after three days of sweat and sheer willpower. During the climb, he faced a combination of complex terrain and scorching heat. Despite the agonizing pain of blisters on his heels forming and eventually bursting, he gritted his teeth and pushed through to the finish line. His cries of pain on the rock face serve as marks of his struggle; by overcoming these daunting obstacles, he reaped his own "the third kind of joy." embodying the true meaning of exploring new frontiers.

- Climbing Location: Yosemite, California, USA
- Challenges: Big wall climbing + Overnight on the Wall + Ascender+ Squeeze Chimney + Slab Climbing
- Route Name: Liberty Cap, Southwest Face

Day 1, Pitches 1-5: (Grade: Intermediate 5.10b)
Day 2, Pitches 6-10: (Pitch 7: Advanced 5.11b), (Pitch 10: Intermediate 5.9 )(Squeeze Chimney)
Day 3, Pitches 10-14: (Summiting)

EP13: New Horizons on the Rocks - (Beijing Baihe Special, Part 1)
After returning from North America, Wang Yibo reunites with Discovery China explorer Zhou Peng at the Baihe climbing crag in Beijing. They enjoy a session of leisure climbing while sharing stories from Yibo's climbing journey in North America. Zhou also leads him in setting up a thrilling high-wire zipline. Returning to these familiar rocks, Yibo approaches the climb with an entirely new perspective and mindset.

- Climbing Location: Baihe, Beijing
- Challenges: Lead Climbing, High-wire Zip line
- Routes:

1. Reading Option (Grade: Intermediate 5.7)
2. Scimitar Cliff (Grade: Intermediate 5.10a)

EP14: New Horizons on the Rocks - (Beijing Baihe Special, Part 2)
Wang Yibo visits Zhou Peng's home as a guest. The two engage in a deep conversation about work, life, and their personal reflections on rock climbing. After their chat, Zhou hosts a BBQ gathering where they exchange experiences with several climbing coaches. Yibo is not only immersed in the pure joy of climbing but also carries a fervent passion for exploring diverse climbing routes across China. He aims to use his influence to promote and improve domestic climbing culture. His dedication turning passion into responsibility is the ultimate interpretation of the spirit of exploration.

- Location: Zhou Peng's Residence
- Challenges: Ice Axe Training (Dry-tooling)

== Broadcast ==
In mainland China the series was broadcast on Tencent Video every Friday (SVIP) Saturday(VIP) and Saturday、Sunday starting from November 28, 2025, 14 episodes released over 7 weeks with two episodes per week.

== Reception ==
The China Exploration Association published an article titled "How many professional skills are hidden in Wang Yibo's "rock climbling challenge", which recognizes Wang Yibo's continuous breakthroughs in skill depth and strategic height.
