= Zhenjian Yang =

Chinese film producer

Zhenjian Yang is a Chinese film producer and screenwriter.

== Filmography ==
- Painted Skin, (2008)
- Painted Skin: The Resurrection, (creative supervisor)
- The Wrath of Vajra, (2013, also screenwriter)
- Asura, (2018, also screenwriter)

== See also ==
- Chinese film people
