= Exploring the Unknown with Wang Yibo =

Chinese Documentary Series

- Promotional Poster
- Also known as: Chinese: 探索新境·寻找王一博
- Genre: Documentary; Reality; Adventure
- Starring: Wang Yibo; Cheng Er
- Country of origin: China
- Original language: Mandarin
- No. of seasons: 1

Production
- Running time: approx. 38 minutes

Original release
- Network: Tencent Video
- Release: 31 August – 6 October 2024

Exploring the Unknown with Wang Yibo (Chinese: 探索新境·寻找王一博; pinyin: tàn suǒ xīn jìng . xún zhǎo wáng yī bó) is a 2024 Chinese outdoor exploration documentary series produced by Warner Bros. Discovery. The film records Chinese Actor Wang Yibo following six Discovery China explorers to six extreme geographical destinations, embarking on an outdoor exploration journey deep into the polar regions, and explores topics about young people's growth through six themes. The series was broadcast on Tencent Video from August 31, 2024.

The Exploring the Unknown with Wang Yibo Season 2 was broadcast on Tencent Video on November 28, 2025.

== Overview ==
As the initiator of the program, actor and singer Wang Yibo partnered with six Discovery Chinese explorers to embark on an outdoor exploration journey. Film Director Cheng Er was a special interviewer to explore Wang Yibo's mental journey and personal growth when he participated in the program.

The program has joined hands with six top Chinese survival and outdoor experts: jungle survival skills expert Xing Enxue, mountaineering expert Zhou Peng, an extreme explorer who focuses on cave exploration Wang Hao, underwater photographer Zhou Fang, rock climber Liu Yongbang, and desert survival expert Wu Xinlei. In the 12-episode program, they accompanied Wang Yibo to six extreme geographical destinations including tropical rainforest, snow-capped mountains, Caves, Sea, Rocks and Deserts to complete the exploration missions.

== Broadcast ==
In mainland china the series was broadcast on Tencent Video every Saturday and Sunday starting from August 31, 2024, 12 episodes released over 6 weeks with two episodes per week.

It premiered on Discovery Max and Discovery Channel south east asia regions on 28 December 2024, as 6 episodes.

It aired in Japan for the first time on LaLa TV on Sunday, April 6, 2025.

== Reception ==
The series has attracted widespread attention and heated discussions during its premiere in China, set a record high popularity for Tencent Video documentaries, and it also topped the platform's multiple lists.

The series won the Gold Award in series-documentary category at the 46th Telly Awards.
