= Matt William Knowles =

American actor

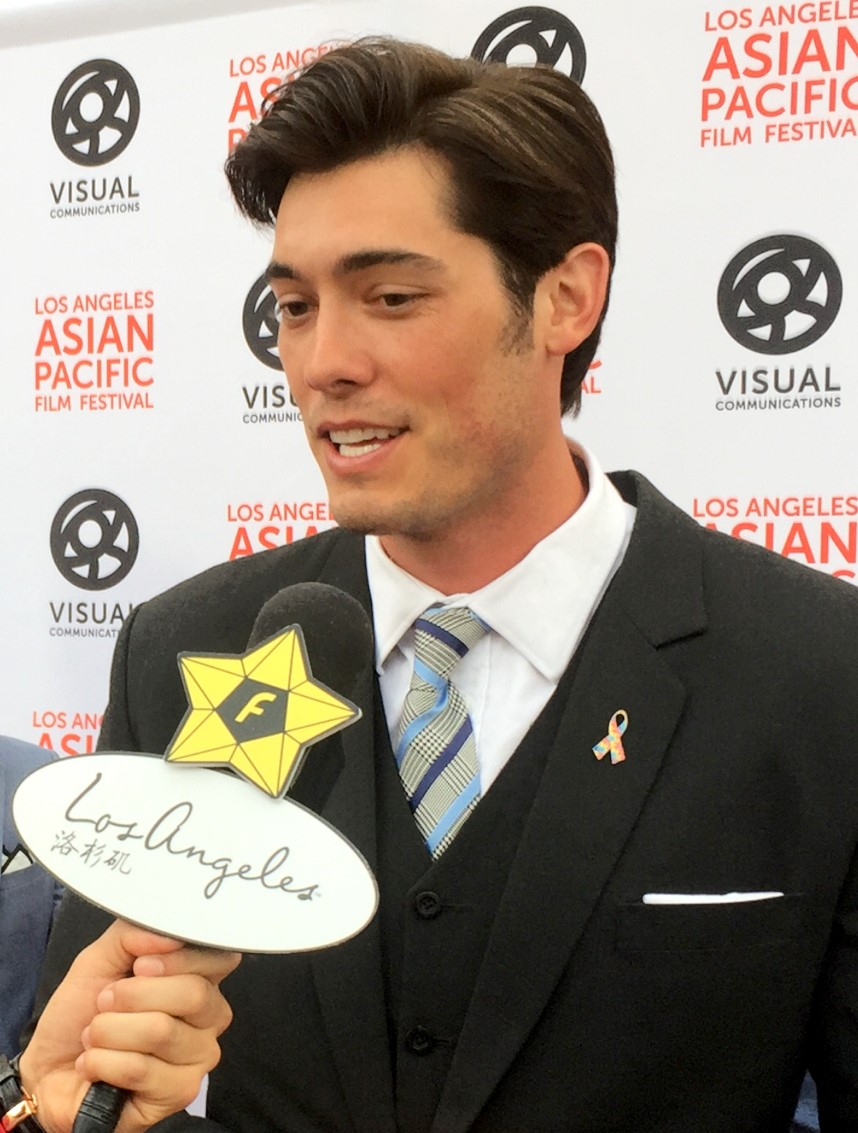
- Knowles at the 2017 Los Angeles Asian Pacific Film Festival
- Born: Greenville, South Carolina, US
- Other name: Ma Tai (马泰)
- Education: Royal Academy of Dramatic Art; Beijing Film Academy; Clemson University
- Occupation: Actor

Matthew William Knowles, known professionally as Matt William Knowles or Ma Tai (Chinese: 马泰), is an American actor. A graduate of the Royal Academy of Dramatic Art, he is known for portraying Jim Zwerg in the Spike Lee executive-produced civil rights drama Son of the South (2021), and for his work in Chinese-language film and television, including as the character of 'Rawa' in the $100 million fantasy film Asura (2018) and as 'Thor' in the sports dramedy Clash, which premiered at the 2025 International Film Festival Rotterdam. Knowles is also a graduate of Beijing Film Academy, where he became the first non-Asian student in the school's history.

In 2018, he was awarded best actor at the Canada China International Film Festival in Montreal, Canada for his role as Charles Harris in Poppies.

== Career ==
Knowles' entertainment career began when he was discovered singing Mandarin love songs in a Chinese karaoke hall and signed with a Chengdu, China agency. Shortly afterwards, he had a small role as a Viking Warrior in the 2013 film Vikingdom. In 2014, after graduating from Beijing Film Academy, Knowles guest starred on two Chinese shows, Red Sorghum and Deng Xiao Ping at History's Crossroads. Knowles hosted the 2014 Oscars virtual simulcast for Youku to China. In 2015, Knowles was seen in the recurring role of Dr. Barnes on Shanghai Media Group's drama Love Me If You Dare as well as the American pilot, Paul Tibbets in Eastern Battlefield. In 2016, he portrayed American Marine Corps General Evans Carlson on CCTV's period military drama Red Star Over China.

He starred as the mythical Demi-god, Rawa, next to Chinese star Leo Wu in Asura, a $100 million fantasy adventure film that was directed by Peng Zhang. Knowles also stars as Jim Zwerg in the film Son of the South, executive produced by Spike Lee and as Charles Harris in a short film titled Poppies. In 2023 Knowles was seen in the role of Hans in the Korean War drama Winter and Lion. In 2024, Knowles starred as Hadley in a Mandarin-language stage adaptation of The Shawshank Redemption, which toured China. He also appeared as Barrett in the 2024 espionage film Burning Stars and next to Wang Yi Bo as German weapon's expert William in the drama War of Faith.

Knowles starred as "Thor," an American football player, in the sports dramedy film Clash, which had its international premiere at the 2025 International Film Festival Rotterdam (IFFR).

== Filmography ==
Year	Title	Role	Notes
2012	There Will Be Blood	Lao Da	Short
2012	Big Sister's Store	John Sand	TV series
2013	Time to Show	Matthew	Film
2013	Vikingdom	Viking Warrior	Film
2014	Deng Xiao Ping at History's Crossroads	Western Oil Representative	TV series
2014	Red Sorghum	AP Press Reporter	TV series
2015	Upright Men and Women	Ma Tai Long	Online Series
2015	Northern Attraction	Anatoli	Short
2015	Eastern Battlefield	Paul Tibbets	TV series
2016	Journey to the East	Uncle Matty	TV Pilot
2016	Love Me If You Dare	Dr. Barnes	TV series
2016	Red Star Over China	Evans Carlson	TV series
2018	Love and Four Walls	Matthew	Film
2018	Asura	Rawa	Film
2018	Poppies	Charles Harris	Short
2019	Bond of Justice: Kizuna	Jet	Film
2020	Son of the South	Jim Zwerg	Film
2021	Haunted Trail	Mark	Film
2021	Immoral Compass	Handsome Firefighter	TV series
2022	The Grand Canal	Thomas	TV series
2023	Winter and Lion	Hans	TV series
2024	War of Faith	William	TV series
2024	Burning Star	Barrett	Film
2024-2025	The Shawshank Redemption	Hadley	Play
2025	Clash	Thor	Film

== Charity work ==
In 2009, Knowles moved to China's impoverished Guizhou Province to do service work. Knowles lived in the town of Duyun where he taught English to over 1,500 students each week. During the weekends, he would run humanitarian projects in the surrounding mountains. Knowles is a supporter of autism awareness internationally through his support of Autism Speaks, Autism Guardian Angels, and the Lions Club International China. In December 2017, Matt returned to his childhood elementary school to give a motivational speech. In June 2018, Knowles became the 40th rotating mayor of Danzhai Wanda Village in Guizhou, China as part of their poverty alleviation program. In Danzhai, rotating mayors are chosen from a diverse field of non-political foreign applicants.

== Personal life ==
Knowles grew up in Greenville, South Carolina where he attended Sara Collins Elementary School. In 9th grade, he was cut from the C-team football team at J.L. Mann High School. In 2007, Knowles walked on to the Clemson Tigers Football team where he received the Most Improved Defensive Walk-on Award before a knee injury ended his football career. In 2008, Knowles graduated from Clemson University with a degree in Civil Engineering, and then moved to a poor region in China for humanitarian work. It was here that Knowles learned to speak fluent Mandarin Chinese. In 2013, Knowles earned a scholarship to the Beijing Film Academy, in which he became the school's first Caucasian student. In 2018, he graduated with a Master of Arts from the Theatre Lab program at the Royal Academy of Dramatic Art in London, England.
