= The Wrath of Vajra =

- Film poster
- Chinese: 金剛王：死亡救贖
- Directed by: Law Wing-cheung
- Screenplay by: Zhenjian Yang
- Story by: Lu Qinan
- Produced by: Law Wing-cheung
- Starring: Xing Yu; Yoo Sung-jun
- Cinematography: Edmond Fung
- Edited by: David Richardson
- Music by: Chen Tao; Wang Bei
- Production companies: Kylin Films; Ningxia China Production; China Film Group; Media Asia Group; Huaming Star; Soulpower
- Distributed by: Media Asia Distribution; Well Go USA (USA); Entertainment One (Canada); Youku Tudou Films
- Release date: 23 September 2013 (Hong Kong)
- Running time: 111 minutes
- Countries: China; Hong Kong
- Languages: Chinese; English; Japanese
- Budget: CNY 100,000,000 (estimated)

The Wrath of Vajra (金剛王：死亡救贖) is a 2013 martial arts film directed by Law Wing-cheung and starring Xing Yu and Yoo Sung-jun. A Chinese-Hong Kong co-production, the film was produced by Media Asia Film, China Film Group, Kylin Film and Ningxia China Production.

== Plot ==
Long ago a death cult called the cult of Hades was formed at the Hades shrine in a faraway land, where children of their enemies were abducted and trained into deadly assassins to avenge their opponents and to instill fear in the minds of the people. One of these children, K-29 (Huzi) who has the power of the '17-seconds-deadly moves' (also known as the wrath of Vajra), grows up to be an especially gifted assassin. There's no one at Hades who could defeat him, except Daisuke Kurashige whose powers were an equal match to that of K-29. However Daisuke lacked the true power of Vajra that K-29 had. The cult grows evil in its ways where the children are made to fight each other and in this process, K-29's brother (K- 31) who fights against K-29 supposedly dies. Unable to bear the guilt for his brother's death, K-29 swears a secret oath of revenge against the Hades cult. So now, K-29 who's the greatest assassin in the temple and who is rightfully the Vajra king defeats his counterparts including Daisuke- where K- 29 gives Daisuke a scar on his face while defeating him. But K-29 doesn't kill them, and moves to Shaolin to begin his peaceful life along with his very young brother Qinquong. There he is guided by a monk. However, he still waits for an opportunity to destroy the Hades cult that was responsible for making him a living weapon. As time grows the cult gets dissolved and as many years pass, the legend of the king of Vajra becomes a myth faded into obscurity and the wrath of Vajra becomes a mystery. In the meantime, the ruling prince of that land visits the founder of the hades cult - Sensei Amano (who is now in prison and has grown old) and tells him to revive the cult once again so that fear can be instilled among the people. The cult leader agrees and entrusts this revival task to his most trusted and talented pupil- Daisuke Kurashige (who being a child of the Hades cult has now become an exceptionally great warrior and has not given up the principles of Hades unlike K-29) to resume the cult at hades shrine by beginning a game of death where renowned warriors are summoned from all over the globe and made to fight against the Hades warriors and the ones who emerge victorious will be proclaimed to have the Vajra in them. Daisuke agrees to this and also wrongfully acknowledges himself to be the Vajra king and he makes the people believe that his counterparts- Tetsumaku (a great fist warrior) and crazy monkey (a blood thirsty hyper- flexible warrior) to also have the Vajra in them. However the people there including some of Daisuke's servants fail to believe Daisuke for they know for sure that this is a false propaganda, and they also know that the one who has the real power of Vajra is K-29. This enrages Daisuke and Amano and so they device a plan to somehow bring back K-29 to Hades shrine so that Daisuke could kill him (K-29) and shatter the people's belief that K-29 is the real king of Vajra (Moreover Daisuke was also eagerly waiting for 12 years to avenge K- 29 for the scar he had given him earlier). So they kidnap K-29's younger brother- Qinquong and forcefully add him to the rest of the cult children- who will be later mindwashed to accept Hades cult. The news reaches K-29, which angers him and so he returns from Shaolin (after getting the blessings of his chief monk) to Hades shrine to avenge the abduction of his younger brother (Qinquong). There at the Hades shrine, he (K-29) is given an open challenge by Daisuke that if he defeats Tetsumaku and crazy monkey, then he (K-29) would have a chance to fight against him (Daisuke). K-29 agrees to this and defeats Tetsumaku and crazy monkey with exceptionally talented skills. Daisuke realises that K-29 has saved his Vajra stance during these fights and has not revealed them, only to defeat him (Daisuke) in the last moment, as both were equally matched. Seeing this many warriors join hands with K-29 and the cult of hades gets split into two factions- the one that supports K-29 and the one that supports Daisuke. A rebellion ensues between them and Daisuke is surprised to find out that Hades warriors are using weapons instead of fighting by hand. It's now that he (Daisuke) realises that the cult of Hades is a hoax just to instill fear in the minds of people. During this coup, Amano's daughter- Eko (who was sent by Amano to report the events at Hades shrine) gets killed while trying to save the children. Meanwhile K-29 and Daisuke enter into a duel combat where K-29 defeats Daisuke by unleashing the wrath of Vajra through his '17- second deadly moves'. Before dying, Daisuke proclaims K-29 as the King of Vajra and then succumbs. K-29 also realises that the undertaker there, who was taking care of the dead was in fact his elder brother- K-31 who he thought was killed by him (K-29) during his childhood. However K-31 reveals to him that he had not died but was saved by some good people and that he had been waiting in disguise all these years for K-29 to return and avenge Daisuke. K-29 and his colleagues then save the abducted children at Hades shrine and free them.

== Cast ==
A former Shaolin monk, martial arts action star Xing Yu (aka Shi Yanneng) stars as Vajra in his first leading role.

- Xing Yu as K-29
- Yoo Sung-jun as Kurashige Daisuke (Nihongo: 倉重大輔, Kurashige Daisuke)
- Nam Hyun-joon as Crazy Monkey
- Jiang Baocheng as Tetsumaku Rai (Nihongo: 鉄幕雷, Tetsu maku Kaminari)
- Zhang Yamei as Eko
- Tony Liu as Huang Zhiqiang
- Hiroyuki Ikeuchi as Prince Shiroginomiya (Nihongo: 城ノ宮王子, Shiro no miya ōji)
- Yasuaki Kurata as Amano Kawao (Nihongo: 天野川尾, Amanogawa o)
- Robert Gilabert Cuenca as Arnold

== Reception ==
Derek Elley of Sino-Cinema wrote that "the film sports a strong lineup of martial talent that's unstarry but gets the job done in a solid way."

== See also ==
- Man of Tai Chi
- The Taking of Tiger Mountain
