= Edifier =

Chinese audio equipment manufacturer

Beijing Edifier Technology Company, Ltd.
- Native name: 北京漫步者科技有限公司
- Romanized name: Běijīng mànbùzhě kējì yǒuxiàn gōngsī
- Type: Public ltd.
- Traded as: SZSE: 002351
- Industry: Consumer electronics
- Founded: 1996; 30 years ago
- Headquarters: Beijing, China
- Products: Loudspeakers; Headphones; Audio equipment
- Number of employees: 3,000
- Website: www.edifier.com

Edifier (Chinese: 漫步者; pinyin: Mànbùzhě; lit. 'Slow walker'), officially Beijing Edifier Technology Company, Ltd., is a Chinese audio equipment manufacturer that primarily produces speakers, music systems, and headphones for personal and home entertainment.

Edifier at CES 2012

A Edifier speaker in Bengaluru (2026)

== Background ==
The company was established by Wen Dong Zhang in Beijing, China in May 1996. Edifier is publicly listed on the Shenzhen Stock Exchange.

Shortly after its founding, Edifier expanded internationally by establishing operations in Canada and entering the North American market in the late 1990s. The company later expanded distribution and operations across Europe, Asia-Pacific, South America, and the Middle East, with products sold through distributors and regional partners in more than 70 countries.

Edifier products are distributed globally through major e-commerce marketplaces and international retail chains. The company maintains official storefronts and retail distribution through platforms including Amazon, Lazada, and Best Buy.

Edifier products are also sold through regional online marketplaces and electronics retailers across North America, Europe, and Asia, including Shopee, Rakuten, AliExpress, MediaMarkt, Fnac, and Micro Center.

In 2011, the company acquired Japanese electrostatic headphone manufacturer STAX, expanding its presence in the high-end audiophile market.

In 2013, Edifier announced Hecate, as Edifier's gaming-focused audio brand and product line. Originally launched as a gaming product series within Edifier, the brand later expanded into a broader gaming audio and peripherals lineup.

The company also operates Airpulse, a premium audio brand developed in collaboration with audio engineer Phil Jones and focused on high-fidelity speaker systems.

== Products ==
Edifier manufactures consumer audio equipment including bookshelf speakers, desktop audiosystems, headphones, earbuds, gaming products, and professional audio equipment.

=== Bookshelf and desktop audio ===
The company is known for its active bookshelf speakers and desktop speaker systems designed for home entertainment, desktop listening, and nearfield audio applications. Product lines such as the R1280 series, R1700 series, S series, M series, and QR series have been distributed internationally through both online and retail channels.

The R1280DB bookshelf speakers became one of Edifier’s most widely recognized speaker products and were noted by technology publications for their Bluetooth connectivity, multiple input options, and affordability. It became widely known for combining Bluetooth, optical, coaxial, and RCA connectivity into a simple plug-and-play speaker aimed at mainstream users rather than traditional hi-fi enthusiasts. Meanwhile, the R1700BT series introduced Bluetooth bookshelf speakers with integrated amplification and wireless connectivity aimed at home audio and desktop listening markets.

In recent years, Edifier expanded its desktop and home audio lineup with products such as the M90 active speaker system and the QR65 desktop active monitor speakers. The Edifier M90 introduced HDMI eARC connectivity, Bluetooth 6.0, and USB-C connectivity to Edifier’s active speaker lineup for television and multimedia integration. The QR65 incorporated integrated lighting effects and GaN charging functionality alongside wireless audio connectivity.

=== Headphones and earbuds ===
Edifier produces wireless headphones, noise-canceling headphones, and wireless stereo earbuds for consumer audio markets. The company’s headphone lineup includes over-ear wireless headphones, gaming headsets, and portable listening products distributed internationally.

Notably, the WH950NB wireless over-ear headphones incorporated active noise cancellation, LDAC support, and Hi-Res Audio Wireless certification. The product became one of Edifier’s most widely reviewed wireless headphone models and contributed to the company’s expansion into the premium wireless headphone market. The W820NB Plus series expanded Edifier’s mid-range wireless headphone lineup with hybrid active noise cancellation and high-resolution wireless audio support. Edifier also released the NeoBuds Pro true wireless earbuds, which incorporated hybrid active noise cancellation and LHDC high-resolution wireless audio support.

Under its STAX Spirit product line, the company introduced the STAX Spirit S5 wireless planar magnetic headphones, which combined planar magnetic driver technology with wireless Bluetooth connectivity. The STAX Spirit series represented Edifier’s expansion into premium planar magnetic headphones and higher-end audiophile-oriented wireless headphone products.

=== Gaming audio ===
Edifier markets gaming-focused audio products under its Hecate brand, including gaming headsets, speakers, and related peripherals. Hecate was introduced as Edifier’s gaming-focused product line in 2013. The Hecate G2000 Pro gaming speakers incorporated virtual surround sound processing, RGB lighting effects, and Bluetooth connectivity aimed at desktop gaming setups.

=== Studio monitors ===
The company also manufactures studio monitors. The Edifier MR studio monitors series was developed for music production, content creation, and desktop monitoring applications.

== Brands and subsidiaries ==
Edifier operates several audio-focused brands and product lines, including STAX, Hecate, and Airpulse, which target different segments of the consumer and professional audio markets.

=== STAX ===
STAX is a Japanese audio brand acquired by Edifier in 2011, known for its electrostatic headphone systems and amplifiers. Its inclusion in the Edifier portfolio is significant as it represents the company’s entry into the high-end audiophile segment, particularly in electrostatic audio technology, which is distinct from conventional dynamic driver headphones.

=== Hecate ===
Hecate is Edifier’s gaming-focused brand and product line, introduced in 2013. It focuses on gaming headsets, speakers, and peripherals designed for PC and console gaming audiences. The brand is notable for marking Edifier’s expansion into the gaming audio sector, which differs from its traditional home audio and desktop speaker markets.

=== Airpulse ===
Airpulse is a high-fidelity speaker brand developed through a collaboration between Edifier and audio engineer Phil Jones. The brand focuses on premium bookshelf speakers and high-end audio systems positioned toward audiophile and professional listening markets. Its significance within Edifier’s portfolio lies in its role as the company’s dedicated high-end loudspeaker brand, distinct from mainstream consumer audio products.

== International operations and affiliated entities ==
Edifier operates through regional entities and affiliated companies in markets including Hong Kong, Canada, Japan, and Singapore.

- Edifier International Limited - a Hong Kong-based entity associated with Edifier’s international operations.
- Edifier Enterprises Canada Inc. - the company’s Canadian regional entity and supports Edifier’s presence in the North American market.
- Edifier Japan Ltd. - operates as Edifier’s regional entity in Japan.
- LIFA Air - Edifier has been associated with LIFA Air through Lifa Air (Dongguan) Air Purification System Co., Ltd., a joint venture founded by LIFA Air and Edifier. According to LIFA Air, the Dongguan joint venture was owned 30 percent by LIFA Air and 70 percent by Edifier.

== Brand ambassadors and partnerships ==
Edifier has collaborated with athletes, musicians, and entertainers as part of its international marketing and regional brand campaigns.

In 2024, Edifier partnered with NBA players Donte DiVincenzo and Jared McCain in the United States in connection with the company’s W830NB wireless headphones campaign.

In 2024, Edifier announced actor and singer Wang Yibo as a brand spokesperson in China through regional promotional campaigns and marketing activities.

In 2025, Edifier announced actor Kento Yamazaki as an Asia brand ambassador for the company, with a focus on the Japanese market.

In 2025, Edifier announced actor Pond Naravit as a regional brand ambassador in Thailand through the company’s Southeast Asian marketing campaigns and social media promotions.

=== Milestones ===
- 1996 – Edifier was founded in Beijing, China.
- 1998 – The company completed its Beijing manufacturing center and began exporting speakers internationally, including to Argentina.
- 1999 – Edifier established Edifier Enterprises Canada Inc. as part of its expansion into the North American market.
- 1999 – Edifier became one of the first companies in China to manufacture 2.1 and 4.1 speaker systems with wooden enclosures for the consumer computer audio market. The satellite-and-subwoofer speaker design contributed to the company’s growth in Mainland China’s multimedia speaker market.
- 2001 – The company established its Shenzhen manufacturing center as domestic market share expanded in China.
- 2004 – Edifier established its Beijing production base and jointly founded Dongguan Platinum Audio Systems Co., Ltd. with audio engineer Phil Jones, later associated with the Airpulse brand.
- 2006 – Construction of the Dongguan Songshan Lake Industrial Park began.
- February 5, 2010 – Edifier launched its initial public offering, becoming the first publicly listed audio speaker company in China.
- 2011 – Edifier acquired Japanese audio company STAX, known for its electrostatic headphone systems and amplifiers.
- 2013 – Edifier introduced Hecate as its gaming-focused audio product line.
- 2016 – The company invested in U.S.-based planar magnetic headphones manufacturer Audeze.
- 2018 – Dongguan Edifier Esports Technology Co., Ltd. was established as part of the company’s gaming and esports expansion.
- 2020 – Dongguan Edifier Auto Electric Technology Co., Ltd. was established, expanding the company’s presence in automotive-related audio technologies.
- 2021 – Edifier released the NeoBuds Pro, which the company described as the world’s first true wireless earbuds with Hi-Res Wireless certification.
- 2024 – Edifier announced Chinese singer-songwriter and actor Wang Yibo as a brand spokesperson for the company.
- 2024 - Edifier released the STAX Spirit S10, described by the company as a true wireless earbud model using planar magnetic driver technology.
- 2025 – Edifier introduced wireless earbuds with real-time translation features and announced Japanese actor Kento Yamazaki as an Asia brand ambassador.
- 2026 – Edifier marked its 30th anniversary.

== Brands and subsidiaries ==
- Edifier
- STAX - Japanese high-end electrostatic earspeaker
- Airpulse - High-end hi-fi speaker brand
- Hecate - Gaming audio brand
- Huazai(花再) - Brand for young consumers
- Xemal - Low-end wireless earbud brand
- Volona - Wireless earbud brand for female consumers

== See also ==
- List of studio monitor manufacturers
