= One and Only (film) =

2023 Chinese film

- Theatrical release poster
- Traditional Chinese: 熱烈
- Simplified Chinese: 热烈
- Literal meaning: Enthusiasm!
- Directed by: Dong Chengpeng
- Written by: Su Biao; Dong Chengpeng
- Produced by: Chen Zhixi
- Starring: Huang Bo; Wang Yibo
- Cinematography: Danny Chen
- Edited by: Huangzeng Hongchen
- Music by: Fei Peng
- Production companies: Ruyi Entertainment; Shanghai Hanna Pictures; Shanghai Tacheng Pictures
- Distributed by: Alibaba Pictures; China Film Co
- Release dates: July 28, 2023 (China); June 17, 2023 (SIFF)
- Running time: 120 minutes
- Country: China
- Language: Mandarin

One and Only is a 2023 Chinese comedy-drama film directed and co-written by Dong Chengpeng. It tells the story of a veteran hip-hop dancer and a young dancer who dream of becoming a professional breakdancer. This film released on July 28 and was the closing film for the 25th Shanghai International Film Festival.

== Plot ==
The plot centers around Ding Lei (played by Huang Bo), who meets Chen Shuo (played by Wang Yibo), a young dancer who loves and sincerely pursues his dreams. Chen Shuo was invited by Ding Lei's to join his dance troupe, which consists of many dancing masters with different personalities. Chen Shuo cherishes this opportunity very much, but as he looks forward to the opportunity to play during competitions, he finds that everything is not as smooth as expected. Facing with the constant pull of family obligations and dreams, Chen Shuo is firm in his original aspirations. While working hard to support his family, he is also constantly moving towards pursuing his dream of being a professional breakdancer.

The film ONE AND ONLY shines a spotlight on the journey of a nobody in pursuit of his dreams. Chen Shuo, a passionate teenager, shoulders the burden of his family, but never gives up on the pursuit of his dream. He runs back and forth between life and passion, trying to balance between faith and reality, and writing a hymn to his youth with his own determined will. The film also tells the audience a story of inter-generational inheritance: when Ding Lei, a veteran street dancer, meets Chen Shuo, a young street dancer, Ding Lei's words "keep working hard and you will succeed" rekindle the youngster's faith; and Chen Shuo's perseverance and hard work have also restored the initial aspiration of this disillusioned street dance veteran. The mentoring friendship and the reborn soul of the group bring unparalleled strength to the teenager, who leads the members of the group with his enthusiasm and fearlessness, to compose together a passionate melody of summer with their youth.

== Cast ==
- Huang Bo as Ding Lei (丁雷）
- Wang Yibo as Chen Shuo (陈烁)
- Liu Mintao as Du Lisha (杜丽莎)
- Yue Yunpeng as Uncle Du (小舅)
- Xiaoshenyang as Brother Xie (谢哥)
- Zhang Zixian as Liu Hongliang (刘洪亮)
- Song Zu'er as Li Mingzhu (李明珠)
- Jiang Long as Dong Erlang
- Casper Chu (Chu Xiao Xiang) as Kevin
- Wang FeiFei as Chilli
- Zhang Haiyu as Patrick
- Liao Bo as Luffy
- Wang Hai (professional dancer) as Jr. Taco
- George (professional dancer) as Dragon
- Yang Xiaojian (professional dancer) as Snakeman
- Zhou Senlin (professional dancer) as Forest
- Ye Yin (professional dancer) as Wukong
- Mo Shaoqing (professional dancer) as Prophecy
- Zhang Yunchen (professional dancer) as Sniper
- Yang Di (cameo) as Yang Di's Waxwork
