= Stax Ltd. =

Japanese audio equipment manufacturer

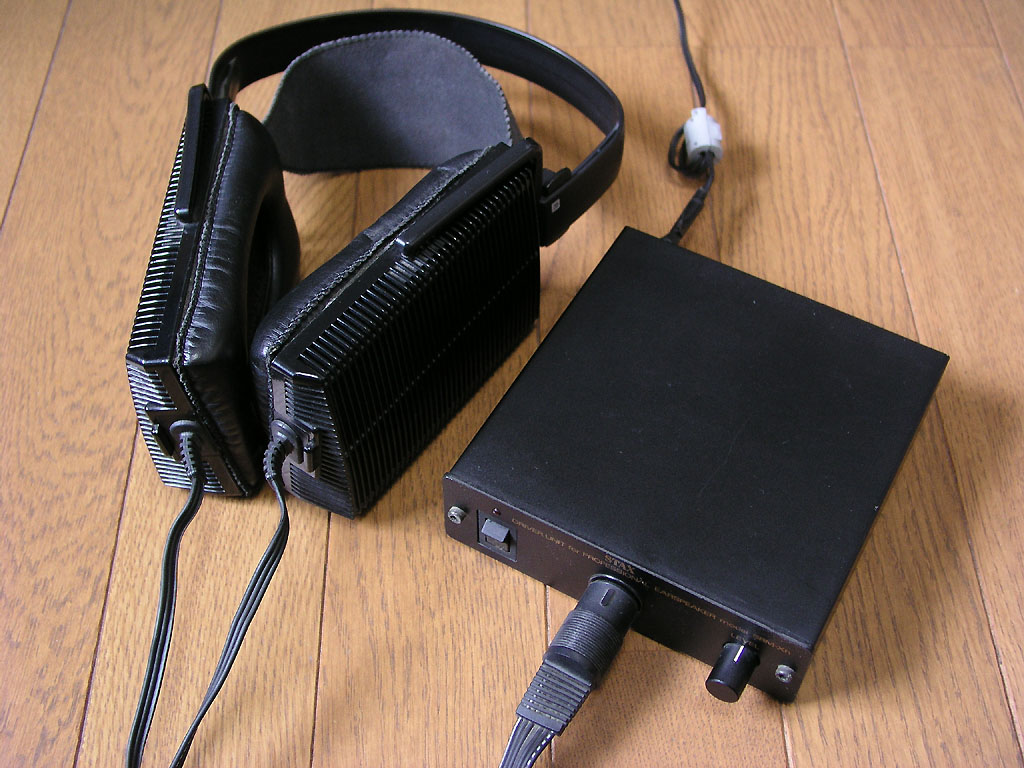
Lambda Nova basic system

Logo

Stax Ltd. (有限会社スタックス Yugen-gaisha Sutakkusu) is a Japanese company that makes high-end-audio equipment. Stax is best known for their electrostatic and electret headphones, which they call “earspeakers.” Electrostatic headphones work similarly to electrostatic loudspeakers, but on a smaller scale. In December 2011, Chinese audio equipment company Edifier announced that it had acquired 100% equity in Stax.

== History ==
Stax Ltd. was founded in 1938. Twenty-two years later, in 1960, Stax released their first electrostatic earspeaker, the Stax SR-1. Over the following thirty-six years Stax produced a variety of amplification, earspeaker, tonearm, CD player, DAC, phono cartridge and loudspeaker products. In 1995, fifty-seven years after the company’s foundation, it became insolvent. The company was revived in 1996 as the new STAX company. In December 2011, Chinese loudspeaker manufacturer Edifier announced the acquisition of 100% equity in Stax.

== Products ==
As of June 2020, the current Stax product lineup consists of seven electrostatic earspeakers, seven electrostatic amplifiers and accessories for these products including extension cords and a headphone stand.

=== Earspeakers ===
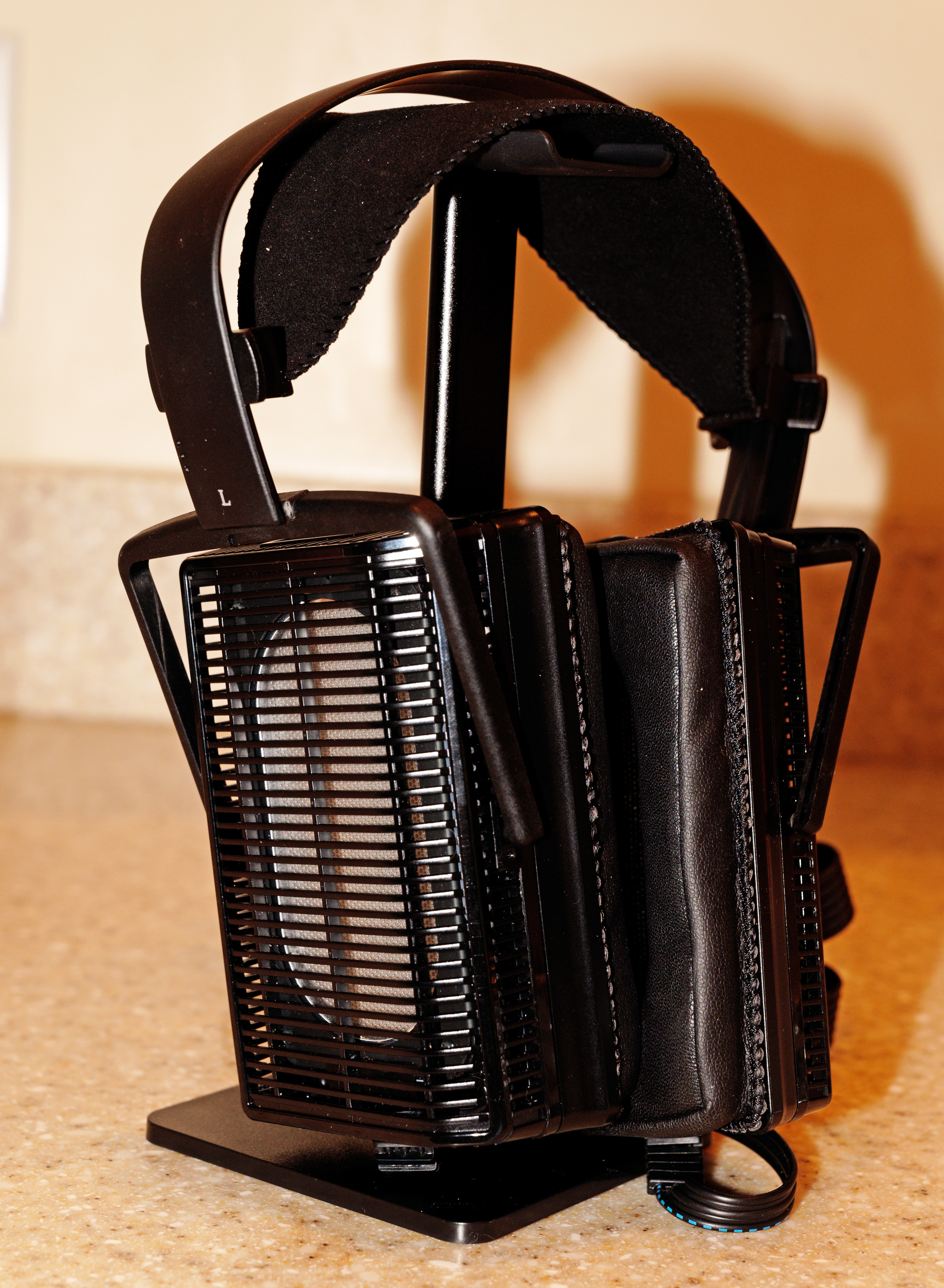
STAX SR-L300

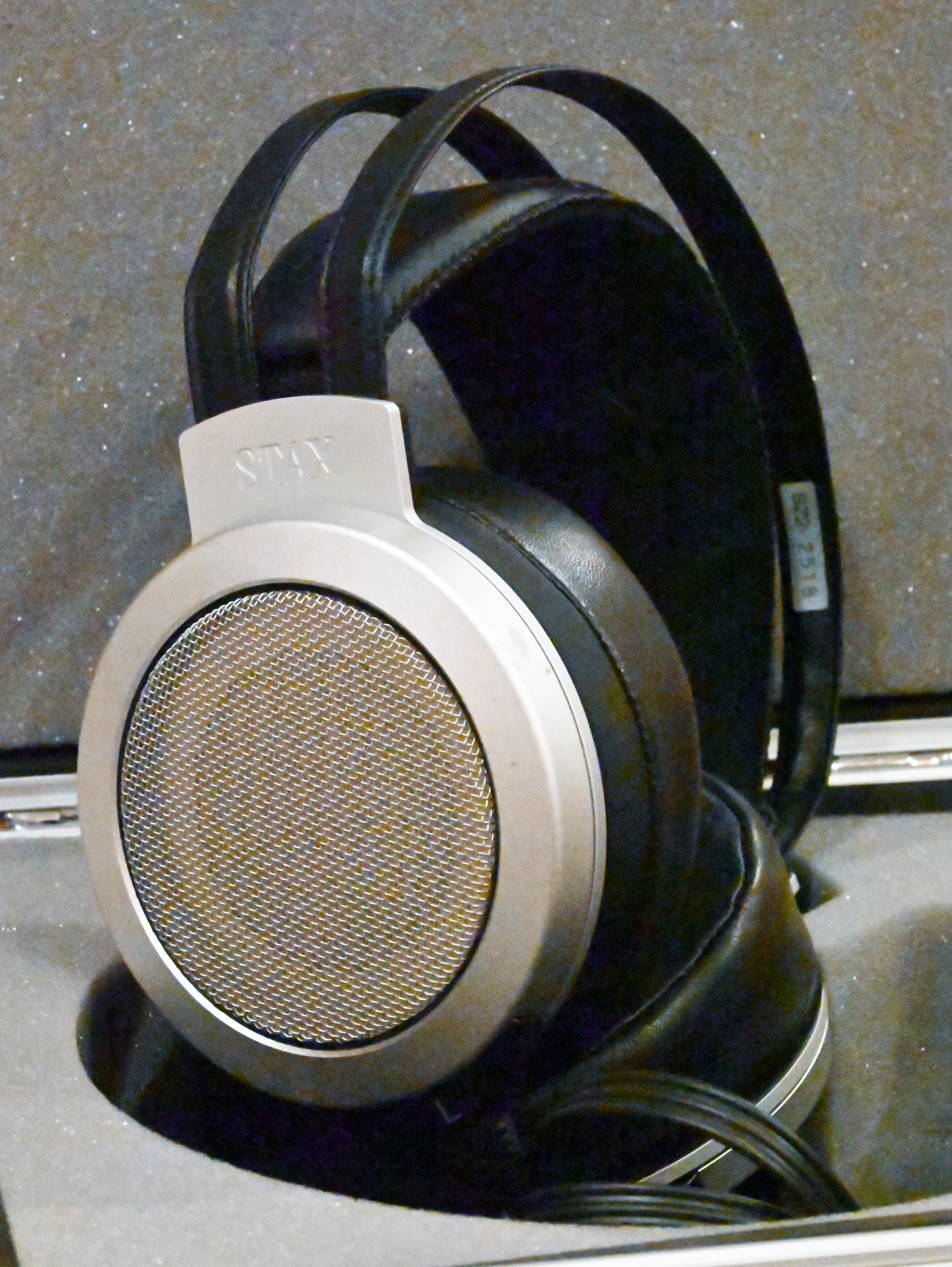
STAX SR-007A

Four current models of earspeaker are based upon Stax’s classic “Lambda” design. These are the SR-L300, SR-L300 Limited, SR-L500 and SR-L700.

Five models of the small in-the-earspeaker (in-ear monitor) type were produced. They include: SR-001, SR-001mk2, SR-002, SR-003, and SR-003mk2. The SR-003 and SR-003mk2 are terminated with a standard “Pro-Bias” plug and are designed for use with a standalone electrostatic amplifier. The SR-001, SR-001mk2, and SR-002 are terminated with a proprietary plug and are designed for use with their matching battery powered electrostatic amplifier for use as part of a high-end portable audio system. One model, the SR-003 MK2 is currently in production.

One model, the 4070, is a closed back electrostatic earspeaker, primarily targeted at studio and broadcast application.

Stax’s flagship earspeakers are the SR-009 (a model in the “Omega” series), which has an MSRP of $4,450 in the United States. Its predecessors are the SR-007 and SR-007A. Stax introduced a new flagship model, the Stax SR-X9000, in December 2022.

There are two different bias voltages for Stax earspeakers. The first earspeakers have a 230 volt bias, referred to as “Normal” bias. The later earspeakers have a 580 volt bias, referred to as “Pro” bias. The Normal bias earspeakers use a six-pin vintage Amphenol microphone plug, while the Pro bias ones use a five-pin plug, which is like the six-pin plug with one pin not present. Normal bias provides a separate bias (DC voltage used to charge the diaphragm) for each side, which can cause a temporary volume imbalance between the left and right channels until the diaphragms are fully charged. Pro bias (five-pin) earspeakers can be plugged into a Normal bias (six-pin) socket, and will work, however volume should be kept low, as if arcing between the diaphragm and stators does occur, there will be significantly higher current discharged into the diaphragm, which will most likely burn the conductive coating off the diaphragm. Normal bias earspeakers cannot be physically plugged into Pro bias sockets, as this would make arcing between the diaphragm and stators significantly more likely, due to the voltage disparity between the two standards. All current Stax earspeakers are Pro bias, as the last Normal bias earspeaker went out of production around 1992.
