= Legend of Fei =

ChineseTV series (2020)

- Drama poster
- 有匪
- Genre: Wuxia; Historical; Romance
- Based on: Bandits (有匪) by Priest
- Directed by: Wu Jingyuan
- Starring: Zhao Liying; Wang Yibo
- Opening theme: "Chasing Waves" by Shang Wenjie
- Ending theme: "No Extravagance" by Jane Zhang & Liu Yuning
- Country of origin: China
- Original language: Mandarin
- No. of episodes: 51

Production
- Production location: Hengdian World Studios
- Running time: 45 mins

Original release
- Network: Hubei TV; Tencent Video
- Release: 15 December 2020 – 3 February 2021

Legend of Fei (Chinese: 有翡) is a 2020 Chinese historical drama based on Priest's novel Bandits (有匪). It was directed by Wu Jingyuan and stars Zhao Liying as Zhou Fei and Wang Yibo as Xie Yun. The series tells the growth story of the female warrior Zhou Fei through her adventure with itinerant poet and traveler Xie Yun, in a time when the influence and power of the martial arts world is on decline and in turmoil because a great secret, which has been buried for twenty years, is about to be uncovered. The storyline is unique as it is oriented towards the female standpoint in martial arts world, which has typically empowered the male characters.

The show was premiered on the Hubei TV Channel on 15 December 2020, and then was exclusively broadcast on Tencent Video and WeTV on 16 December of the same year. For standard account on Tencent Video, the show aired one episode daily at 20:00 CST from Monday through Sunday, from 16 December 2020, to 3 February 2021.

== Synopsis ==
Many years ago, there was chaos in the realm of Jianghu. A famous swordsman named Li Zheng (Hu Bing) established the 48 Strongholds to fight against the evils and protect the common people, but after his death, the popular Jianghu sects lost prominence. Li Zheng's daughter Li Jinrong (Che Xiao) took over the sects and married Zhou Yitang (Zong Fengyan). Their daughter, Zhou Fei (Zhao Liying) grew up in a safe but isolated home. Sick of being confined to the place of her birth, Zhou Fei longs to escape and makes repeated efforts to get away. But her life takes a great turn when she almost drowns while saving her cousin and is saved by a free-spirited young martial arts master named Xie Yun (Wang Yibo). Thus begins their special relationship. They decide to hone their fighting skills together when meeting again after Zhou Fei gains permission to descend the mountains and go on a mission. While fighting against Disha Manor and other evil forces, the relationship between Zhou Fei and Xie Yun develops. Meeting new martial arts masters along the way, they begin to unearth secrets, including that of Xie Yun's true identity and the treasure that has been hidden for several years by the previous dynasty.

== Cast ==
=== Main cast ===
- Zhao Liying as Zhou Fei
- Wang Yibo as Xie Yun/Anzhi/Xiao Chuan/Qian Suiyou

=== The 48 Strongholds ===
- Hu Bing as Li Zheng (Zhou Fei's grandfather) (South Blade)
- Che Xiao as Li Jinrong (Zhou Fei's mother)
- Zong Fengyan as Zhou Yitang (Zhou Fei's father)
- Chen Ruoxuan as Li Sheng (Zhou Fei's cousin)
- Zhou Jieqiong as Li Yan (Zhou Fei's cousin)
- Wang Chunyuan as Yu Lao
- Yuan Yizi as Kou Dan
- Yan Linfei as Ma Jili/Uncle Ma
- Feng Jun as Old Madame Wang

=== Others ===
- Zhang Huiwen as Wu Chuchu
- Zhang Xinyu as Yang Jin
- Sun Jian as Yin Pei
- Leng Jiyuan as "Poisoner" Ying Hecong
- Dong Xuan as Duan Jiuniang
- Wang Wanjuan as Lady Nishang
- Ruan Shengwen as Ji Yunchen (North Blade)
- Li Duo as Mr. Bai (Route gang elder)
- Zheng Xiaodong as Yin Wenlan (Mountain Blade)
- Frankie Guo as Mu Xiaoqiao (Phoenix Master)
- Wang Xinqiao as Zhu Chen
- Ma Jinwen as Master Tong Ming
- Yang Chengming as Huo Liantao

=== Disha Manor ===
- Geng Le as Shen Tianshu
- Dai Xiaoying as Hu Tianying
- Wang Huilai as Lu Tiankuang
- Wei Binghua as Tong Tianyang
- Jing Gangshan as Chu Tianyu
- Chen Yutong as Chou Tianjin
- Fan Zhechen as Gu Tianxian

=== Political characters ===
- Wang Xiuzhe as Yuwen Zhi
- Wang Li as Wang Lin
- Leon Li as Wen Yu
- Zhang Jiashuo as Chen Zichen

== Reception ==
On China Tencent Video platform, "Legend of Fei" reached a record of over 130 million views within only the first 8 hours of release and 4 billion views in just over 1 month. When the drama series ended in February 2021, although all the episodes except the first two had already been locked by Tencent, the number of views still achieved a record of 5.12 billion on the exclusive domestic platform. "Legend of Fei" is also popular overseas, gaining Top 1 spot on WeTV Thailand and WeTV Philippines after only 1 week of simultaneous release.

== Awards and nominations ==
Year	Award	Category	Nominee	Result	ref.
2021	Tencent Video 10th Anniversary	Film with the most Commercial Value of the Year	Legend of Fei	Won	
2021	Tencent Video 10th Anniversary	Top 5 Movies most Loved by VIP Members of the Year	Legend of Fei	Won	
2021	Tencent Video 10th Anniversary	Top 12 most Popular Movies of the Year	Legend of Fei	Won	
2021	WeTV Top Ranking 2021	C-Drama Top 5 Views (No.1)	Legend of Fei	Won	

== Original soundtrack ==
No.	Title	Singer	Length
1.	"Chasing Waves (逐浪)" (Opening theme song)	Shang Wenjie	3:39
2.	"No Extravagance (无华)" (Ending theme song)	Jane Zhang & Liu Yuning	4:22
3.	"First Rays (熹微)"	Wang Yibo	4:11
4.	"Like Fei (如翡)"	Elvis Wang & Lai Meiyun	3:45
5.	"Knot (结)"	Hu Xia	4:36
6.	"The World Do Not Deceive Youth (红尘莫欺我少年)"	Curley G	3:53
7.	"Song of Picking Lotus (采莲曲)"	Chen Jue	2:27
