= Qingsongchou =

- Website type: Crowdfunding
- Available in: Chinese, English
- Website: www.qschou.com
- Commercial: Yes
- Users: 150,030,961
- Launched: September 2014; 12 years ago
- Current status: Online

Qingsongchou (Chinese: 轻松筹; lit. 'easy fundraising') is a crowdfunding website in China. The website allows users to create an online fundraising campaign to raise money for their causes such as medical bills. The owner of fundraiser can share their campaign to social media like WeChat, Weibo to maximize exposure.

Established in Beijing, China in September 2014, Qingsongchou have completed B+ investment in June 2016. The financing was joint-invested by IDG, Tencent, etc.

As of May 2017, according to the data showed on the website, Qingsongchou has serviced 150 million registered users, for a total of 1.8 million fundraisers in China.

== See also ==
- Comparison of crowdfunding services
