= Wang Yibo =

Chinese actor and singer (born 1997)

- 王一博
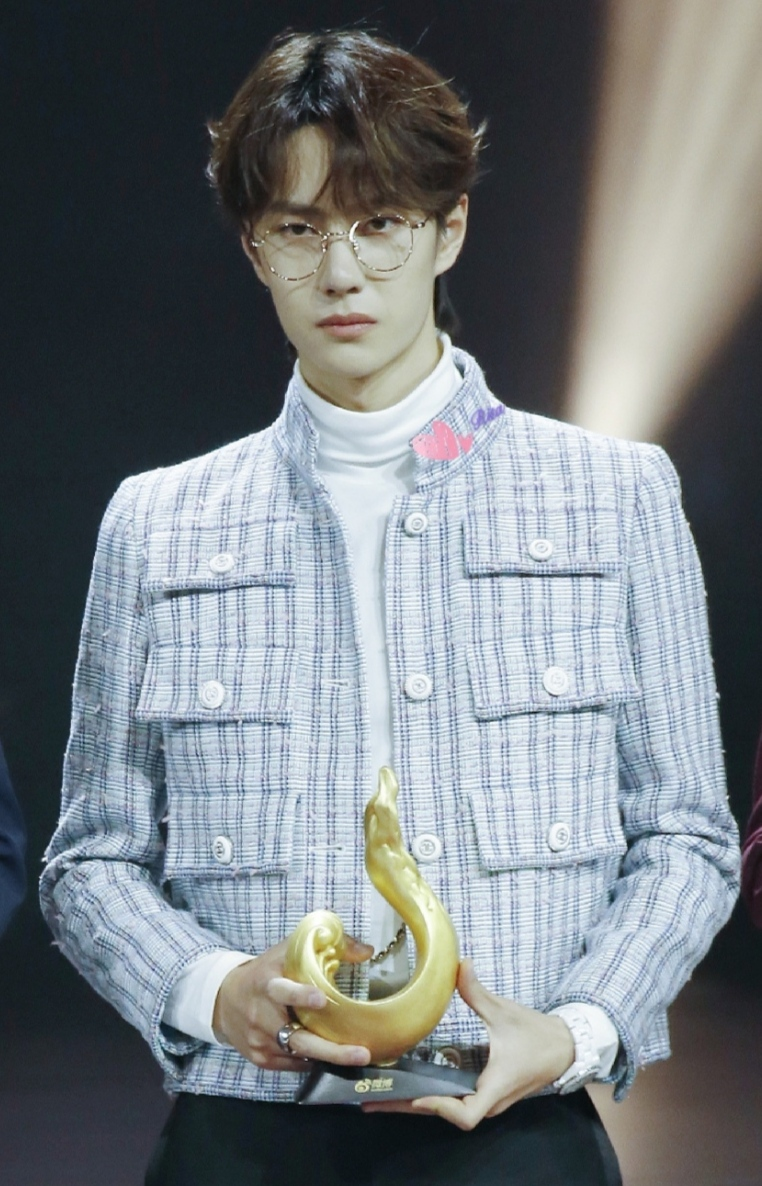
- Wang in 2020
- Born: 5 August 1997 (age 29); Luoyang, Henan, China
- Education: Hanlim Multi Art School
- Occupations: Actor; dancer; singer; rapper; motorcycle racer; racing driver
- Height: 182 cm (6 ft 0 in)
- Musical career
- Genres: K-pop; C-pop
- Instruments: Vocals
- Years active: 2014–present
- Label: Yuehua
- Member of: Uniq

Wang Yibo (Chinese: 王一博; pinyin: Wáng Yībó, [wǎŋ ípwǒ], born 5 August 1997) is a Chinese actor, dancer, singer, professional road motorcycle racer and racing driver. He debuted as a member of South Korean-Chinese boyband Uniq in 2014. As an actor, he is best known for his roles in television series Love Actually (2017), Gank Your Heart (2019), The Untamed (2019), Legend of Fei (2020), Luoyang (2021), Being a Hero (2022) and War of Faith (2024). He made his big screen lead role debut in 2023, starring in Hidden Blade, Born to Fly and One and Only. His performances have earned him multiple acting nominations at various film awards, including the Golden Rooster Awards, Huabiao Awards and Asian Film Awards. Wang was ranked 9th on the Forbes China Celebrity 100 in 2020, and 2nd in 2021.

== Early life and education ==
Wang Yibo was born on 5 August 1997 in Luoyang, Henan, China. He started dancing when he was young. During his second year in secondary school in 2011, Wang participated in IBD national dance competition and placed in the top sixteen in the hip-hop category, he then became a trainee of Yuehua Entertainment. Prior to his debut, Wang trained in South Korea and studied at Hanlim Multi Art School.

== Career ==
=== 2014–2017: Debut with Uniq and acting debut ===
Wang debuted in 2014 as a member of South Korean-Chinese boy band group Uniq with the song "Falling in Love". He served as the main dancer and rapper of the group. His acting debut was in the film MBA Partners. He then played the role of Red Boy in A Chinese Odyssey Part Three, and starred in the romance comedy drama series Love Actually as the second male lead character Zhai Zhiwei. From 2016 to 2021, Wang served as a co-host on the variety program Day Day Up.

In March 2017, Wang was cast in his first lead role in the youth xianxia drama series Private Shushan Gakuen. In April, he won the Best New Idol Award at the Top Chinese Music Awards. In August, Wang and Guan Xiaotong collaborated to sing "Once Again", the theme song of the movie with same name. In November, Wang released the theme song "Just Dance" for the 4th Xuan Wu Dance Festival. In the same year, Wang made a guest appearance in the youth campus drama series When We Were Young, and was cast in the science fiction drama series Super Talent, later named My Strange Friend.

=== 2018–2019: Solo debut and breakthrough ===
In celebration of the 2018 Lunar New Year, Wang performed a solo dance number at the Hunan Spring Festival by Hunan Television. He also performed an adaptation of Uniq's song "Happy New Year" along with other Hunan Television hosts.

In March 2018, Wang was confirmed to be a dance mentor in the reality survival show Produce 101. He gained an increased recognition for his dance skills on the show. In one of the show's episodes, Wang revealed that he had a disease called myocarditis during his childhood and had to give up dancing and undergo serious medication to recover. Eventually, he was cured and had to start learning how to dance from scratch. Wang further shared that after his recovery, he attended six hours of dance lessons daily.

In the same year Wang challenged voice acting, dubbed the character Qi Jingxuan in the animation movie Crystal Sky of Yesterday, which was released in China on 26 October 2018. He also sang the movie OST "Heart Affairs of the Youth".

In January 2019, Wang debuted as a solo singer by releasing his first digital single "Fire". In March, Wang released his second digital single "Lucky".

Wang starred in the esports romance drama series Gank Your Heart, playing a misunderstood professional gamer, which premiered on Mango TV on 9 June. He also sang the series' opening theme song, "Burning Adventure". With his portrayal of Ji Xiangkong, Wang took home his first major acting award for "Audience's Choice for Actor" at the 30th China TV Golden Eagle Award.

On 20 June, the skateboard reality show One More Try was broadcast on Tencent Video. Wang appeared as a team leader in this 10 episode skateboard sports competition show.

In the same year, Wang starred in the xianxia drama series The Untamed, based on the novel Mo Dao Zu Shi, which premiered on Tencent Video on 27 June. Wang also released the song "Won't Forget", the theme song for his character in The Untamed. He gained an increased recognition and popularity both in China and overseas for his portrayal of Lan Wangji. Wang later entered the Forbes China's Celebrity 100 and 30 Under 30 list for the first time.

On 30 December 2019, Wang released his third digital single "No Sense", which is his first attempt in songwriting. He wrote it intermittently as he was busy shooting the drama series Legend of Fei. Wang shared that the song reflected his personal feelings and experiences. He intended for it to convey his wish that others, too, would overcome challenges and maintain a positive mindset. Six million digital copies of the song were sold within 20 minutes after its release, exceeding 30 million yuan in total sales. The song became the fastest digital single to sell over 10 million copies on NetEase Music. Wang then performed "No Sense" for the first time at Hunan Television's 2020 New Year's Eve Concert.

=== 2020–2022: Mainstream popularity ===
In May 2020, Wang was confirmed as one of the four captains in the dance competition show Street Dance of China Season 3 (这!就是街舞3). Through this show, Wang got an increased recognition for his street dance background and skills. In October, Yang Kai, a member of his team Yi Bo Wang Zha (一波王炸) won the competition.

On 19 August 2020, the TV series My Strange Friend premiered on iQIYI. Wang played the character Wei Yichen in this science fiction drama series.

In December 2020, Wang starred as the male lead character Xie Yun in the wuxia drama series Legend of Fei, based on the novel Bandits (有翡), was broadcast on Tencent Video. He also sang the OST "First Rays" for the series. The series was very popular both domestically and internationally. It not only reached a record of over 130 million views in eight hours after its release and 4 billion views in one month on Tencent Video, but also earned number one spot on WeTV Thailand and Philippines after one week of simultaneous release.

On 30 December 2020, Wang released his fourth digital single, "My Rules" (我的世界守则). The song, composed by 24 and Vince from The Black Label with Wang participated in the lyrics writing, expresses his determination to follow his own path and find his self-worth. With this song, Wang broke a new record of the fastest digital single to sell 10 million copies on NetEase Music, which equals to 30 million yuan, within only 2 hours and 20 minutes. The single debuted at 14th on the Billboard World Digital Song Sales during the fourth week of January 2021. Wang performed "My Rules" for the first time at the Hunan Television's 2021 New Year's Eve Concert, where he also had a collaboration stage with Wang Leehom to the song "Descendants of the Dragon".

On 11 February 2021, Wang made his first appearance on the CCTV Spring Festival Gala, singing and dancing in a creative show titled Ox Strut alongside Andy Lau and Guan Xiaotong to celebrate the Year of Ox, which is the zodiac of all three performers. In the same month, Wang also appeared for the first time on CCTV's Lantern Festival Gala, singing his song "Youth Comes in Time" for his individual stage. During the grand gala celebrating the 100th anniversary of the founding of the Chinese Communist Party, Wang performed the song "Walking With You" together with Karry Wang and Roy Wang, as part of the theatrical performance The Great Journey.

In June 2021, Wang played the role of Jiang Xianyun, a Chinese historical figure, in the episode The Choice (抉择) of the movie series Faith Makes Great (理想照耀中国). In the same month, Wang was chosen as one of the nine individuals appearing in Youku's serial documentary My Legacy and I Season 2, which follows the life and work of nine Chinese outstanding performers in their fields over the past two and half years.

In August 2021, Wang returned as one of the captains of the dance competition show Street Dance of China Season 4. Ye Yin, a member of Wang's team, won the competition, making Wang's team's second win in the two seasons of the show. Wang starred as Baili Hongyi in the period mystery drama series Luoyang alongside Huang Xuan and Victoria Song, the series premiered on Iqiyi on 1 December.

On 30 December 2021, Wang released his fifth digital single "Standup" (廿) which topped the QQ Music New Song Chart. He performed the song for the first time at the Hunan Television's 2021/2022 New Year's Eve Concert the next day.

On 11 August 2022, the TV series Being A Hero premiered on Youku. Wang played the character Chen Yu, an anti-narcotics policeman in this crime drama series directed by Fu Dongyu, headlining alongside Chen Xiao. In the same month he returned as one of the captains of the dance competition show Street Dance of China Season 5.

On 10 September 2022, Wang made his first appearance on CCTV's Mid Autumn Festival Gala, he and Zhou Dongyu performed the song "Moments of You in My Life". In December, Wang released his sixth digital single "像阳光那样" (Like the Sunshine). He performed an interpretive dance as a debut performance of the song on the Dragon TV 2022/2023 New Year's Eve concert. The single, released on midday 30 Dec became China's biggest selling single for 2022 before the year was out.

=== 2023–2024: Film debut ===
Wang's first film in a leading role, Hidden Blade, a neo-noir spy thriller set mostly in Shanghai during the Japanese occupation, was released in China on 22 January 2023. It also opened in selected theaters across the US and Canada on 17 February, and in Australia on 2 March. It opened in Hong Kong on 9 March, and New Zealand on 16 March. In the movie, he starred alongside veteran actor Tony Leung. The film's domestic box office exceeded ¥930 million (RMB). He got a Best Supporting Actor nomination for his role as Mr. Ye in this film at the 36th Golden Rooster Awards.

In April, he played the character Lei Yu, a test pilot in the action drama film Born To Fly,. The film tells the story of a team of special elite pilots in the Chinese air force (PLAAF), who were tasked with testing out new fighter jets. The J-10C, J-16 and the J-20 made their big screen debut with the film. The film had a final domestic box office of ¥850 million (RMB).

In July, One and Only, a sports comedy starring Wang as a young break-dancer who dreams and struggles to enter a professional team and compete for the Asian Game trophy, was released. It also performed well at the box office and was listed in the top 20 grossing Chinese film list compiled by industry data website The Numbers in 2023. He got a Best Actor nomination at the 37th Golden Rooster Awards and an Outstanding Actor nomination at the 20th Huabiao Awards for his role as Chen Shuo in this film. Wang's short film All Tomorrow's Parties, directed by Zhang Dalei, was shortlisted for the 73rd Berlin International Film Festival.

On 29 December 2023, Wang released his first personal EP Bystander (旁观者) consisting of two tracks "Bystander" (旁观者) and "Everything Is Lovely" (万物可爱) which won the first place in QQ Music Annual EP chart within two hours of its release. Wang participated in CCTV New Year's Eve gala and performed the song "Dragon Clan" with Wu Tong. At Hunan Television's 2023/2024 New Year's Eve Concert he performed his new song "Bystander" for the first time and also performed the song "I'll miss you" with Da Zhang Wei.

On 21 March 2024, the TV series War of Faith premiered on CCTV-8 and iQiyi. Wang played the character Wei Ruolai, a young patriotic man in this republican era spy finance drama. On 1 May, the movie Formed Police Unit in which he starred as Yang Zhen, a peacekeeping police man beside Huang Jingyu and Zhong Chuxi was released nationwide in China. The film tells the story of the Chinese United Nations Police were sent on an overseas mission at the request of the United Nations.

On 15 May, Wang Yibo, Ambassador of the Olympic Qualifier Series Shanghai, came on stage for the finale and sang the theme song "Vibrant Shanghai" of the Welcome Celebration. On 14 July, he served as one of the Paris 2024 torchbearers to relay the Olympic flame in Paris, France.

On 29 July, WildAid ambassador Wang Yibo's journey in search of the Chinese pangolin, the documentary series Defenders of the Hidden premiered on Youku. On 31 August 2024, the documentary series from Discovery Exploring the Unknown with Wang Yibo premiered on Tencent Video. In the 12-episode series (released over 6 weeks with two episodes per week) Wang Yibo partnered with six different expert guides to experience the Rainforest, Mountaineering, Caving, Diving, Rock Climbing and the Desert.

On 28 December, Wang released a new single "我在" (I AM NOT HERE) and he performed the song for the first time at the Hunan Television's 2024/2025 New Year's Eve Concert where he also had a collaboration stage with Wang Han and Da Zhang Wei to the song "I'm so happy to look back". He also participated in CCTV New Year's Eve gala and performed his own promotional single "The sky is high and the sea is vast".

=== 2025–present ===
On 28 January 2025, Wang appeared on CCTV Spring Festival Gala for the second time, singing the song "I can" with Jam Hsiao.

On 9 October, The theme song "With Overwhelming Momentum"(气势如虹) and its music video for the 15th National Games of the PRC have been officially released.

On 28 November, the documentary series from Discovery Exploring the Unknown with Wang Yibo Season 2 premiered on Tencent Video.

On 16 February 2026, Wang appeared on CCTV Spring Festival Gala for the third time, singing and dancing "Shine and Move" with Aaron Kwok.

== Other ventures ==
=== Endorsements and ambassadorships ===
Wang is a recognized brand ambassador in China. He has partnered with over 30 brands, and his endorsement ranges from domestic products such as Master Kong and Pechoin to international brands such as Lacoste, Evisu and Shu Uemura. He is also the spokesperson of brands including Jeanswest, Tempo and Edifier. Since 2020, Wang has been the youngest member and youngest brand ambassador of the Elite Club of the German luxury car brand Audi. He is also the youngest male house ambassador of the French luxury fashion house Chanel, the first male global brand ambassador of Jimmy Choo and the global brand ambassador of the Spanish luxury fashion house Loewe.

In 2020, Wang was the first entertainer in Mainland China to become an official partner of Nike. In March 2021, Wang terminated his contract with the company after Nike criticized China for human rights violations against Uyghurs in Xinjiang, in the aftermath of U.S. sanctions on cotton grown in the region that followed widespread allegations of forced labor. The following month in April 2021, Wang was appointed the global chief brand ambassador of the sportswear brand Anta, which is the official sports apparel partner of 2022 Winter Olympics and 2022 Winter Paralympics.

Through his pursuit of extreme sports, particularly skateboarding and motorcycle racing, as well as his widespread influence in the younger generation, Wang was appointed by the Chinese government as promotional ambassador of Chinese Skateboarding, and the ambassador for Chinese winter sports and the 2022 Beijing Winter Olympics and Paralympics. He also has served as the China's top dancer promotional ambassador, appointed by the Chinese Dancers Association since 2021, for his dancing skills and experiences. In 2024, to further highlight the Series' mix of sports and culture, the Local Organising Committee of the Shanghai event has appointed Wang as its promotional ambassador for the 2024 Olympic Qualifier Series.

Wang has appeared on the front covers of the Chinese edition of various international magazines, such as Vogue, Elle, GQ, Marie Claire, Cosmopolitan and Harper's Bazaar. In March 2020, Wang became the first Chinese celebrity to grace all three covers of SuperELLE China by himself. In November, Wang starred in a fashion film project between Vogue Film and Chanel alongside Zhou Xun titled Le Vrai Ou (花的游吟).

=== Philanthropy ===
Wang has used his image to raise awareness for multiple causes, such as Firefighting Public Welfare of Luoyang City, SOS Children's Villages' campaign with Qingsongchou "No Child Alone: I want to have a family", the Civil Traffic of Hunan Province, and "Earth Aid, Green Life on the Table", a campaign co-sponsored by WildAid, China Green Carbon Foundation, and Food and Agriculture Organization. On 8 December 2019, Wang was honored as the Kuwo Music's 2019 Role Model Reading Charity Artist. He was one of the celebrity readers of "Model Reading", the first youth reading and sharing program jointly created by Kuwo Music and China Youth Daily. It aims to evoke interest and enthusiasm of the youth to start reading literary works.

Wang has been active to show his support in fighting the COVID-19 pandemic. In January 2020, Wang and more than 200 celebrities donated a total of 278 million yuan to Han Hong Charity Foundation in order to help the city of Wuhan, an area vastly affected. He made another donation to Wuhan together with the other hosts of Day Day Up. They collectively donated 1 million yuan worth of masks, protective clothing, and other necessary supplies. Wang also sang a number of original songs as a tribute to front liners of the COVID-19 pandemic and to convey love and hope during those challenging times. Under the guidance of the Communist Youth League of China, Wang and other actors collaborated to sing "With You By My Side" (有你在身边), a song that is part of the music album Love Is Not Separated, created by China Youth Daily, China Youth Online, and Ku Wo Music. In March 2020, Wang and Xinhua News Agency launched the tribute song "We Stay Together" (因为我们在一起) to inspire people to work together against the pandemic.

Continuing his role as a WildAid ambassador, Wang starred in the two-part wildlife docuseries Defenders of the Hidden (寻护者) in July 2024, produced in collaboration with Youku and the China Wildlife Conservation Association to promote the protection of the critically endangered Chinese pangolin. In October 2026, he starred in Defenders of the Hidden – Season 2: Where Leopards Roam (看见豹之地·寻护者第二季), a two-part docuseries produced by WildAid and Alipay Ant Forest, with support from the Information Office of the Qinghai Provincial People’s Government, to highlight North China leopard conservation initiatives.

=== Racing career ===
On 1 January 2019, Wang officially joined the Yamaha China Racing Team and became a Yamaha signing driver, starting his motorcycle racing career. In May, he participated in Michelin GPGP Grand Prix Beijing Station, his first competition as a professional driver but had to face a motorcycle breakdown in the middle of the race. In August 2019, Wang participated in the ZIC Motorbike Race in Zhuhai International Circuit and won the second place in the mixed competition and the first place in the rookie division.

Between 19 and 20 October 2024, in the GT3 category of the 2024 GTSC series held in Zhuhai International Circuit, Wang Yibo participated in his first official race as an artist, partnered with professional driver Fang Junyu to represent the UNO Racing team. Driving the No. 85 Audi R8 LMS GT3 Evo II, which incorporated the elements of bamboo leaf green snakeskin, they won second place in the first round and won the championship in the second round.

Between 28 and 29 March 2025, Wang participated in the 2025 China GT Championship pre-season warm-up race at Ningbo International Circuit, driving the No. 85 Audi R8 LMS GT3 EVO II, partnered with professional driver Fang Junyu to represent the UNO Racing team and they won the runner-up and successfully stepped onto the podium. From 25 to 27 April, Wang participated in the 2025 China GT Championship Round 1 at Shanghai International Circuit, partnered with racing driver Pan Junlin to represent the UNO Racing team. They drove the No. 85 Audi R8 LMS GT3 Evo II, and won GT3 AM category championship in the first race. In the second race, due to a collision that damaged key components, they had to choose to end the race early.

== Personal life ==
In August 2019, Wang received numerous unsolicited phone calls from callers who purchased his personal telephone number online. Wang answered some of these calls and personally appealed to the callers to respect his privacy and stop calling. He took to his Weibo account to urge fans to support and love him rationally, to stop calling him and not to waste their money to purchase his number as the calls have adversely affected his privacy. He informed that he would change his number even though it was troublesome for him to update his loved ones and transaction arrangements linked to his phone number. He posted screenshots of receiving 194 calls from unknown numbers. Wang's management agency, Yuehua Entertainment threatened to take action informing that it has kept a record of these numbers and that it may turn them over to the authorities if necessary.

== Filmography ==
=== Film ===
Wang Yibo's film credits
Year	Title		Role	Notes	Ref.
Year	English	Original	Role	Notes	Ref.
2016	MBA Partners	梦想合伙人	Zhao Shuyu		
2016	A Chinese Odyssey Part Three	大话西游3	Hong Haier		
2018	Crystal Sky of Yesterday	昨日青空	Qi Jingxuan	Voice role	
2023	Hidden Blade	无名	Mr. Ye		
2023	Born to Fly	长空之王	Lei Yu		
2023	My Youth and I	中国青年: 我和我的青春	Lu Yang	Online Movie. Special Appearance	
2023	One and Only	热烈	Chen Shuo		
2024	Formed Police Unit	维和防暴队	Yang Zhen		
TBA	Intercross	人.鱼			
Unreleased	Unexpected Love	闭嘴!爱吧	Chang Lin		

*Note:* Productions marked as *TBA* are pending official confirmation of release details. Productions marked as *Unreleased* correspond to filmed or completed projects that have not had an official commercial release.

=== Short film ===
Wang Yibo's film credits
Year	Title		Role	Notes	Ref.
Year	English	Original	Role	Notes	Ref.
2018	Live For Real	热舞吧！青春	Lin Jin	Short film	
2019	Wang Yibo's B Side Life	王一博的B面人生	Himself	Documentary	
2020	Le Vrai Ou	花的游吟		Short film	
2021	China Starts Again	中国再出发	Narrator	Short film	
2021	My Legacy and I 2	我的时代和我2	Himself	Documentary	
2022	All Tomorrow's Parties	我的朋友	Li Mo	Shortlisted for the 73rd Berlin International Film Festival	
2024	Defenders of the Hidden	尋護者	Himself	Documentary	

=== Television series ===
Wang Yibo's television series credits
Year	Title		Role	Notes	Ref.
Year	English	Original	Role	Notes	Ref.
2017	Love Actually	人间至味是清欢	Zhai Zhiwei		
2017	When We Were Young	青春最好时	Lin Jiayi	Guest appearance	
2019	Gank Your Heart	陪你到世界之巅	Ji Xiangkong		
2019	The Untamed	陈情令	Lan Wangji		
2020	My Strange Friend	我的奇怪朋友	Wei Yichen		
2020	Legend of Fei	有翡	Xie Yun		
2021	Faith Makes Great	理想照耀中国	Jiang Xianyun	Episode "The Choice" (Chinese: 抉择)	
2021	Luoyang	风起洛阳	Baili Hongyi		
2022	Being a Hero	冰雨火	Chen Yu		
2024	War of Faith	追风者	Wei Ruolai		
Unreleased	Private Shushan Cultivation School	私立蜀山学园	Teng Jing		

*Note:* Productions marked as *Unreleased* correspond to filmed or completed projects that have not had an official commercial release.

=== Television show ===
Wang Yibo's television shows credits
Year	Title		Role	Ref.
Year	English	Original	Role	Ref.
2016–2021	Day Day Up	天天向上	Host	
2018	Produce 101 China	创造101	Dance Mentor	
2019	One More Try	极限青春	Team Leader	
2020	Street Dance of China 3	这就是街舞3	Captain	
2021	Bravo Youngsters	上线吧华彩少年	Mentor	
2021	Street Dance of China 4	这就是街舞4	Captain	
2022	Street Dance of China 5	这就是街舞5	Captain	
2024	Exploring the Unknown with Wang Yibo	探索新境·寻找王一博	Program Creator	
2025	Exploring the Unknown with Wang Yibo Season 2	探索新境第二季	Program Creator	

== Accolades ==
=== Awards and nominations ===
Name of the award ceremony, year presented, nominee(s) of the award, award category, and the result of the nomination
Year	Award ceremony	Category	Nominee/work(s)	Result	Ref.
2017	Top Chinese Music Awards	Best New Idol	Wang Yibo	Won	
2017	Asian Influence Awards Ceremony	Best New Actor	Wang Yibo	Won	
2017	Weibo TV Online Video Awards Ceremony	New Artist of the Year	Wang Yibo	Won	
2017	ifeng Fashion Choice	Most Popular New Actor	Wang Yibo	Won	
2017	Sina Best Taste	New Artist of the Year	Wang Yibo	Won	
2018	QQ Interest Blog Appreciation Night	Male Artist of the Year	Wang Yibo	Won	
2019	Golden Tower Award	Most Popular Actor	The Untamed, Gank Your Heart	Nominated	
2019	Golden Bud - The Fourth Network Film And Television Festival	Best Actor	The Untamed, Gank Your Heart	Nominated	
2019	Weibo TV Series Awards	Most Popular Actor	The Untamed, Gank Your Heart	Nominated	
2019	6th Hengdian Film and TV Festival of China	Tourism Ambassador	Wang Yibo	Won	
2019	Tencent Music Entertainment Awards	Song of the Year	"Unrestrained" (with Xiao Zhan)	Won	
2019	Tencent Music Entertainment Awards	Model Reading Public Welfare Artist	Wang Yibo	Won	
2019	GQ 2019 Men of the Year	Breakthrough Actor of the Year	The Untamed	Won	
2019	26th Huading Awards	Best Newcomer	The Untamed	Nominated	
2019	26th Huading Awards	Top Ten Favorite Actors	The Untamed	Won	
2019	2nd Cultural and Entertainment Industry Congress	Breakthrough Actor (Drama)	The Untamed	Nominated	
2019	2nd Cultural and Entertainment Industry Congress	Best Couple (with Xiao Zhan)	The Untamed	Nominated	
2019	Sina The Most Beautiful Performance	Outstanding Actor of the Year	The Untamed	Nominated	
2019	China Golden Rooster and Hundred Flowers Film Festival (1st Network Drama Awards)	Most Popular Actor	The Untamed	Won	
2019	Baidu Fudian Awards	Hot Star Award	Wang Yibo	Won	
2019	Sina Film & TV Awards	Most Popular Variety Male Artist	Wang Yibo	Won	
2019	Sports Star Power Awards	Best Cross-over Influence	Wang Yibo	Won	
2019	Tencent Video All Star Awards	Idol of the Year	Wang Yibo	Won	
2019	Tencent Video All Star Awards	VIP Star	Wang Yibo	Won	
2019	Tencent Video All Star Awards	Popular TV Actor of the Year	The Untamed	Won	
2019	Netease Cloud Music	Idol of the Year	Wang Yibo	Won	
2019	Jinri Toutiao Awards Ceremony	Male Celebrity of the Year	Wang Yibo	Nominated	
2020	Weibo Awards Ceremony	Hot Figure of the Year	Wang Yibo	Won	
2020	Weibo Awards Ceremony	Weibo God	Wang Yibo	Won	
2020	27th ERC Chinese Top Ten Awards	Top Ten Songs	"Unrestrained" (with Xiao Zhan)	Won	
2020	30th China TV Golden Eagle Award	Best Original Soundtrack	"Burning Adventure"	Nominated	
2020	30th China TV Golden Eagle Award	Audience's Choice for Actor	Gank Your Heart	Won	
2020	Sohu Annual Fashion Festival Award 2020	Charming Man of the Year	Wang Yibo	Won	
2020	iQiyi All-Star Carnival	Scream King	Wang Yibo	Won	
2020	Tencent Video All Star Awards 2020	VIP Star	Wang Yibo	Won	
2020	Tencent Video All Star Awards 2020	All Rounder Artist of the Year	Wang Yibo	Won	
2020	Tencent Entertainment White Paper	Variety Star of The Year	Wang Yibo	Won	
2020	QQ Annual Popular Movie OST Award	Most Powerful OST in Music & Film	"First Rays"	Won	
2021	Douyin Star Night 2021	Douyin God	Wang Yibo	Won	
2021	Douyin Star Night 2021	All-Around Artist of the Year	Wang Yibo	Won	
2021	Hunan TV Award	Best Staff	Wang Yibo	Won	
2021	Hunan TV Award	Artist of the Year	Wang Yibo	Won	
2021	Weibo Awards Ceremony	Hot Figure of the Year	Wang Yibo	Won	
2021	NetEase Indie Music Award	Best Selling Digital Single of 2019–2020	"My Rules"	Won	
2021	Weibo Starlight Awards 2021	Most Popular Artist among Overseas Fans	Wang Yibo	Won	
2021	Weibo TV Series Awards	Most Popular Actor	Legend Of Fei	Won	
2022	Weibo Night Awards	Breakthrough Filmmaker of the Year Award	Wang Yibo	Won	
2023	2023 Weibo Movie Night	Actor of The Year	Wang Yibo	Won	
2023	The 20th China Movie Channel Media Awards	Best New Actor	Hidden Blade, Born to Fly	Nominated	
2023	The 20th China Movie Channel Media Awards	Best Actor	Hidden Blade, Born to Fly	Won	
2023	18th Changchun Film Festival - Golden Deer Awards	Best Actor	One and Only	Nominated	
2023	36th Golden Rooster Awards	Best Supporting Actor	Hidden Blade	Nominated	
2023	11th Zhejiang Film Phoenix Award	Best Actor	One and Only	Won	
2023	2023 Iqiyi Scream Night	Actor of The Year - Film	Wang Yibo	Won	
2023	15th Macau International Movie Festival - Golden Lotus Award	Best Newcomer	Hidden Blade	Nominated	
2023	2023 Tencent Video All Star Awards	Popular Movie Actor of The Year	Wang Yibo	Won	
2024	2023 Weibo Night	Popular Filmmaker of The Year	Wang Yibo	Won	
2024	17th Asian Film Awards	Best Newcomer	Hidden Blade	Nominated	
2024	2024 Weibo Movie Night	Breakthrough Filmmaker of the Year	Wang Yibo	Won	
2024	37th Golden Rooster Awards	Best Actor	One and Only	Nominated	
2024	16th Macau International Movie Festival - Golden Lotus Award	Best Actor	One and Only	Nominated	
2024	15th Macau International Television Festival - Golden Lotus Award	Best Actor	War of Faith	Nominated	
2025	Weibo Night 2024	Popular Filmmaker of the Year	Wang Yibo	Won	
2025	20th Huabiao Awards	Outstanding Actor	One and Only	Nominated	

=== Listicles ===
Name of publisher, year listed, name of listicle, and placement
Year	Publisher	Listicle	Placement	Ref.
2019	Forbes China	Celebrity 100	71st	
2019	Forbes China	30 Under 30	Placed	
2019	Thailand Headlines	Person of the Year	Placed	
2020	Forbes China	Celebrity 100	9th	
2020	Forbes Asia	100 Digital Stars	Placed	
2021	Forbes China	Celebrity 100	2nd	
2024	The Business of Fashion	BoF 500	Placed	
2024	Asia-Pacific Entrepreneurs Association	Asia-Pacific U30 Outstanding Young Leaders	Placed	
2026	Forbes Asia	30 Under 30	Placed	

== Racing career ==
=== Motorcycle racing record ===
Date, series, team, class, and result
Date	Series	Team	Class	Result	Ref.
August 10–11, 2019	Zhuhai ZIC Motorcycle Race	Yamaha China Racing Team	Group D (Beginner Group)	Race 1 Group D: 1st Overall: 3rd	
August 10–11, 2019	Zhuhai ZIC Motorcycle Race	Yamaha China Racing Team	Group D (Beginner Group)	Race 2 Group D: 1st Overall: 2nd	
October 7, 2020	Zhuhai ZIC Motorcycle Race	Yamaha China Racing Team	Group A1	Main Race: DNF	

=== Car racing record ===
Date, series, team, class, and result
Date	Series	Team	Class	Result	Ref.
October 19–20, 2024	2024 GT Sprint Challenge Zhuhai Station	UNO Racing Team	GT3 PA	Race 1 GT3 PA: 2nd Overall: 2nd	
October 19–20, 2024	2024 GT Sprint Challenge Zhuhai Station	UNO Racing Team	GT3 PA	Race 2 GT3 PA: 1st Overall: 1st	
March 29, 2025	2025 China GT Championship Ningbo Station (Pre-season)	UNO Racing Team	GT3 PA	Overall: 2nd	
April 25–27, 2025	2025 China GT Championship Shanghai Station	UNO Racing Team	GT3 AM	Race 1 GT3 AM: 1st Overall: 6th	
April 25–27, 2025	2025 China GT Championship Shanghai Station	UNO Racing Team	GT3 AM	Race 2 DNF	
September 19–21, 2025	2025 China GT Championship Shanghai Station	UNO Racing Team	GT3 AM	Race 1 GT3 AM: 3rd Overall: 13th	
September 19–21, 2025	2025 China GT Championship Shanghai Station	UNO Racing Team	GT3 AM	Race 2 GT3 AM: 5th Overall: 13th	
October 6–8, 2025	2025 Shanghai 8 Hours	UNO Racing Team	GT3 PA	GT3 PA: 2nd Overall: 9th	
April 17–19, 2026	2025 China GT Championship Shanghai Station	UNO Racing Team	GT3 AM	Race 1 GT3 AM: 7th Overall: 21st	
April 17–19, 2026	2025 China GT Championship Shanghai Station	UNO Racing Team	GT3 AM	Race 2 GT3 AM: 4th Overall: 15th	
