= Born to Fly (film) =

2023 Chinese film

- Theatrical release poster
- Traditional Chinese: 長空之王
- Simplified Chinese: 长空之王
- Literal meaning: King of the Sky
- Directed by: Liu Xiaoshi
- Written by: Gui Gan; Liu Xiaoshi
- Produced by: Han Han
- Starring: Wang Yibo; Hu Jun; Yu Shi; Zhou Dongyu
- Cinematography: Bai Yuxia
- Edited by: Li Ruiliang; Xiao Yang; Wei Yong
- Music by: Guo Sida; Mao Buyi; Li Wang
- Production company: PMF Pictures
- Distributed by: PMF Pictures; Alibaba Pictures; Polybona Films; China Film Co
- Release date: April 28, 2023 (China)
- Running time: 128 minutes
- Country: China
- Language: Mandarin
- Box office: US$117.3 million

Born to Fly (Chinese: 长空之王) is a 2023 Chinese action drama film set against the backdrop of the decades of modernization of the People's Liberation Army Air Force. Directed by Liu Xiaoshi and produced by Han Han, the film stars Wang Yibo, Hu Jun, Yu Shi and Zhou Dongyu. The film was released on April 28, 2023 in China and garnered $121 million worldwide.

== Plot ==
Two American F-35 Lightning II fighters enter Chinese airspace and cause havoc near the coast. Flying at supersonic speeds, the F-35s create sonic booms that damage an oil refinery and affect local fishing boats. Chinese pilot Lei Yu intercepts the F-35s with his Chengdu J-10. Lei Yu pushes the limits of his craft to compete against the fifth-generation fighters; the intruding aircraft then leave the airspace. Lei Yu's jet suffers engine problems, forcing him to make an emergency landing.

In a meeting, Lei Yu's superiors criticize him for pushing the jet that far, but Lei Yu argues it was the only way to counter a superior enemy. The higher-ups discuss the main issue: foreign fifth-generation fighters have a huge advantage over their fourth-generation fleet. Secretly, China has been developing the fifth-generation Chengdu J-20 to counter foreign threats. Commander Zhang Ting invites Lei Yu to join the new stealth fighter program, and he agrees.

At the training facility, Lei Yu, along with a group of pilots, undergoes rigorous training to push their physical and mental limits, with only seven to be chosen as test pilots for the new jet. Lei Yu rekindles an old rivalry with fellow candidate Deng Feng, and the two compete to outdo each other throughout the tests, though Deng ultimately scores higher.

While the J-20 is still going through refinement as the prototype WS-13 Taishan engine is incomplete, alternative jets are used to test its capabilities. During a flight exercise with Commander Zhang Ting in a K-8 trainer, Lei Yu and Ting practice spiral dive recovery but lose thrust mid-dive. Believing the situation hopeless, Lei Yu ejects, while Ting regains control and lands the plane. Lei Yu is grounded and requests a transfer, but Ting sends him to the parachute workshop before leaving. There, Lei is subjected to the strict and meticulous procedure of packing a parachute for flight, making him reflect on the seriousness of his earlier decision. It is in this workshop that he first learns about anti-stall parachutes, inspiring him to study the concept further and propose their use to improve flight safety during test maneuvers.

Impressed by Lei Yu’s dedication, Ting eventually decides to take him along for the critical test of the new fighter’s engines and missile systems, choosing him over Deng Feng, who had more points and argued he was the better pilot. Ting counters that Lei’s dedication and technical insight outweigh Deng’s higher score. The test is conducted in a J-16 fighter, during which exhaust from a missile launch is sucked into the air intakes, causing dual engine failure. Both Ting and Lei Yu prepare to eject, but while Lei successfully ejects, Ting remains in the cockpit to steer the jet away from the city. He attempts to eject afterward, but his system malfunctions, killing him in the crash, while Lei survives with severe injuries after landing. Ting is honored with a military burial, and Lei chooses to remain with the program to help complete the J-20.

After Ting's death, the command considers Lei Yu to continue the flight tests, dismissing his petition to leave. Lei Yu accepts and resolves to put aside his rivalry with Deng Feng, who is appointed as the new chief pilot. Together with the other test pilots and engineers, Lei Yu works on designing an anti-stall parachute, which is successfully tested for deployment and jettison using a truck-mounted system. Meanwhile, the engineering team analyzes the causes of Ting's crash and modifies the engine accordingly. Despite the risks and uncertainty of the changes, Lei Yu volunteers to carry out the flight test, with Deng Feng joining as his backseater.

While practicing the jet's ability to recover from a spiraling dive, following the same course as Ting's fatal flight, a flock of birds strikes the cockpit, knocking out both crew members. Lei Yu regains consciousness and attempts to recover control. He deploys the newly installed anti-stall parachute to get the J-16 out of the spin, but the chute fails to detach. Ordered to eject, Lei Yu refuses to leave Deng Feng behind. He pushes the engine to tear the chute free and continues to fight for control as blood in his eyes blinds him, diving down into a valley. Believing them lost, the control room mourns, but to their surprise Lei Yu manages to pull up, proving that the new improvements worked and marking the completion of the prototype, paving the way for mass production.

Later, during a PLAAF military exercise, American stealth fighters and drones infiltrate Chinese airspace and enter the exercise zone, unaware of China's new fifth-generation fighter. Lei Yu and Deng Feng are ordered to intercept the intruders and launch in their completed J-20s, shooting down the drones before engaging the F-35s. Since downing the American fighters would risk an international incident, Lei Yu warns the pilots, prompting the F-35s to retreat.

In a mid-credits scene, Lei Yu and his squadron perform a surprise flyby with colored smoke above a soccer field to honor Commander Zhang Ting's son, Xiaolong.

== Cast ==
- Wang Yibo as Lei Yu, a young elite test pilot
- Hu Jun as Zhang Ting, chief test pilot and commander of the flight test program, Lei's mentor
- Yu Shi as Deng Fang, Lei’s rival and later chief test pilot
- Zhou Dongyu as Shen Tianran, aviation medic and Lei’s love interest

== Release ==
Born to Fly had completed filming in May 2022 and was slated to release on September 30, 2022 to coincide with China's National Day on October 1. The film was shelved without public explanation, which sparked controversy both domestically and internationally. In January 2023, exactly 100 days after it was shelved, the film released new promotional materials. A few days later a release date of May 2023 was announced, coinciding with the Chinese Labor Day holiday.

== Box office ==
The film earned US$44 million on its opening weekend in China, with nearly 10% (US$4 million) coming from IMAX shows.

== Awards and nominations ==
Award	Category	Recipients and nominees	Results
36th Golden Rooster Awards	Best Feature Film		Nominated
36th Golden Rooster Awards	Best Directorial Debut	Liu Xiaoshi	Won
36th Golden Rooster Awards	Best Supporting Actor	Hu Jun	Nominated
36th Golden Rooster Awards	Best Sound Recording	Wang Yanwei	Nominated
36th Golden Rooster Awards	Best Editing	Xiao Yang, Li Ruiliang, Wei Yong	Nominated
