= Saori Hayami =

Japanese voice actress and singer (born 1991)

- 早見 沙織
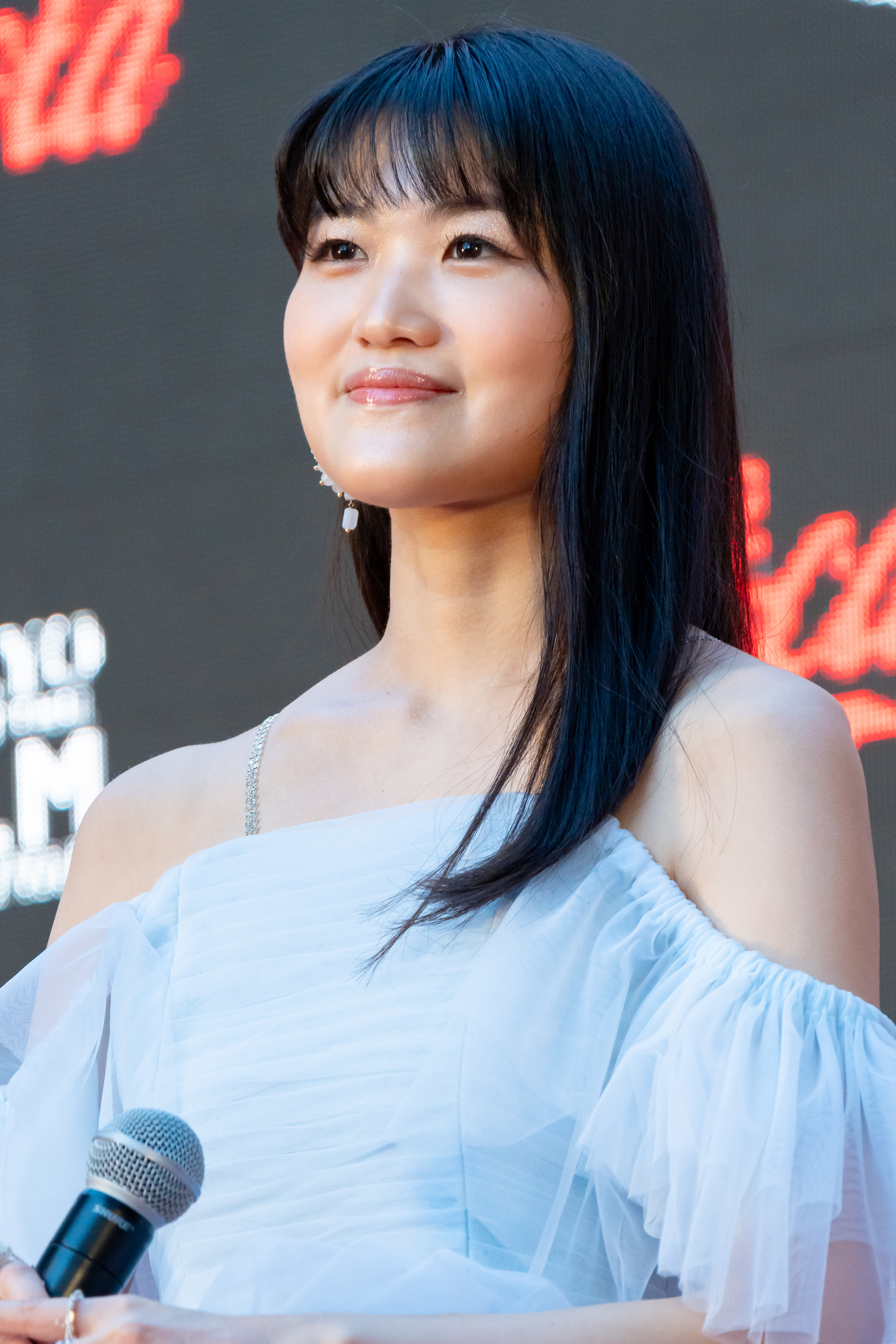
- Hayami at the 36th Tokyo International Film Festival in October 2023
- Born: May 29, 1991 (age 35); Tokyo, Japan
- Education: Waseda University
- Occupations: Voice actress; singer
- Years active: 2007–present
- Agent: I'm Enterprise
- Height: 164 cm (5 ft 5 in)
- Musical career
- Genres: J-pop; Anison
- Instruments: Vocals; piano
- Years active: 2015–present
- Label: Warner Bros. Home Entertainment
- Saori Hayami's voice Hayami, in character as Chuu-tan, performing the song "Kawaikute Gomen"
- Website: www.hayamisaoriofficial.com

Saori Hayami (早見 沙織, Hayami Saori; born May 29, 1991) is a Japanese voice actress and singer affiliated with I'm Enterprise. As a singer, she is signed to Warner Bros. Home Entertainment. Hayami won the 10th Seiyu Awards for Best Supporting Actress.

Some of Hayami's most notable roles as a voice actress include Yor Forger in Spy × Family, Yumeko Jabami in the Kakeguri anime series, Yukino Yukinoshita in My Teen Romantic Comedy SNAFU, Miyuki Shiba in The Irregular at Magic High School, Shōko Nishimiya in A Silent Voice, Shinobu Kocho in Demon Slayer: Kimetsu no Yaiba, Yuzuki Shiraishi in A Place Further than the Universe, and Chizuru "Chuu-tan" Nakamura in Heroines Run the Show.

== Early life and career ==
Hayami was born on May 29, 1991, in Tokyo, Japan as an only child. Hayami became interested in voice acting while attending elementary school. In 2004, she attended junior class of Nihon Narration Engi Kenkyūjo, a voice acting training school. Her career began when she passed an audition for I'm Enterprise in 2006, at the end of her second year in training school. Her voice acting debut was in the Indian Summer drama CD. In 2007, she made her anime debut and landed her first major role as Momoka Kawakabe, the main heroine in Touka Gettan. Since then, she has been active in voicing many other characters in anime-related media and other voice acting works. She placed #2 in 2015 Newtype x Machi Asobi Anime Awards for Best Voice Actress, while her character Yukino Yukinoshita won Best Female Character Award. Since 2011, she has hosted her own radio show, Hayami Saori no Free Style, which won Best Comfort Radio in general category at 3rd Aniradi Awards in 2017. Hayami attended the School of Human Sciences at Waseda University.

Hayami is known for her singing mainly through her work performing anime and character theme songs, such as Kaede Takagaki in The Idolmaster Cinderella Girls franchise. Her debut single, "Yasashii Kibou" (やさしい希望; lit. 'Gentle Hopes'), was released on August 12, 2015, with her writing the lyrics for all the songs in the single. The title song was used as the opening theme for the anime television series Snow White with the Red Hair, in which she voiced Shirayuki. Her second single, the double A-side single "Installation/Sono Koe ga Chizu ni Naru" (その声が地図になる; lit. 'The Voice Will Become A Map'), was released on February 3, 2015, with her taking part in writing and composing both songs. The song "Sono Koe ga Chizu ni Naru" was used as the opening theme for the second season of Snow White with the Red Hair. Her first album, Live Love Laugh, was released on May 25, 2016. She then released a mini album live for LIVE bundled Limited Edition Live Blu-ray/DVD and CD from her first Japanese concert tour, Live Love Laugh, on December 21, 2016.

== Filmography ==
=== Television animation ===
Year	Title	Role	Note
2007	Tōka Gettan	Momoka Kawakabe, Sei	
2007	Clannad	Female student	
2008	Ghost Hound	Female elementary school student A	
2008	Shigofumi: Letters from the Departed	Sweetheart	
2008	Our Home's Fox Deity.	Kō	
2008	Monochrome Factor	Female student, Schoolgirl	
2008	Sekirei	Musubi, Yume	
2009	07-Ghost	Razette, Burupya, Tajio, Sister, Mikage's younger sister	
2009	Basquash!	Violette	
2009	Sora no Manimani	Sayo Yarai, Saku Ōyagi (child)	
2009	Whispered Words	Chizuka Nishikigi	
2009	First Love Limited	Female student A	
2009	Eden of the East	Saki Morimi	
2009	Heaven's Lost Property	Ikaros	
2009	Pokémon: Diamond and Pearl	Lulu	
2010	Ladies vs Butlers!	Suiran Fō	
2010	Bakuman	Miho Azuki	
2010	Okami-san and Her Seven Companions	Kakari Haibara	
2010	Katanagatari	Kōsha Saraba	
2010	Oreimo	Ayase Aragaki	
2010	Sekirei ~Pure Engagement~	Musubi, Yume	
2010	Heaven's Lost Property: Forte	Ikaros	
2010	Star Driver: Kagayaki no Takuto	Wako Agemaki	
2010	Gokujō!! Mecha Mote Iinchō Second Collection	Ibu Himuro	
2010	MM!	Arashiko Yuno	
2010	The Legend of the Legendary Heroes	Kuku	
2011	Sket Dance	Megumi Ogura (credited as Miho Azuki)	
2011	Bakuman 2	Miho Azuki	
2011	Anohana	Chiriko "Tsuruko" Tsurumi	
2011	The World God Only Knows II	Haqua du Lot Herminium	
2011	Penguindrum	Asami Kuhō	
2011	Sekai-ichi Hatsukoi 2	Female student	
2011	Soreike! Anpanman	Cupcake-chan	
2011	Mobile Suit Gundam AGE	Yurin L'Ciel	
2011	Softenni	Shiho Nagumo	
2011	Beelzebub	Isafuyu Kashino	
2011	Morita-san wa Mukuchi	Chihiro Miura	
2012	Hyōka	Kaho Jūmonji	
2012	Bodacious Space Pirates	Mylene Certon	
2012	Ore no Imōto ga Konna ni Kawaii Wake ga Nai -True Route Special Edition-	Ayase Aragaki	
2012	Chōyaku Hyakunin isshu: Uta Koi	Fujiwara no Takaiko	
2012	Nisemonogatari	Yotsugi Ononoki	
2012	Sword Art Online	Sachi	
2012	The Pet Girl of Sakurasou	Fūka Kamiigusa	
2012	Tari Tari	Sawa Okita	
2012	Say "I love you"	Miki Arai	
2012	Sengoku Collection	Tea Way Sen no Rikyū	
2012	Bakuman 3	Miho Azuki	
2012	Muv-Luv Alternative: Total Eclipse	Kyoko Susai	
2012	Initial D Fifth Stage	Mika Uehara	
2012	Fairy Tail	Kagura Mikazuchi	
2013	Arata: The Legend	Emisu	
2013	Gundam Build Fighters	Aila Jyrkiainen	
2013	Day Break Illusion	Kiyone Okakura	
2013	My Teen Romantic Comedy SNAFU	Yukino Yukinoshita	
2013	Love Lab	Hiroka Tanahashi	
2013	Bakuman 3	Mai Annojou, announcer	
2013	Monogatari Series Second Season	Yotsugi Ononoki	
2013	Ore no Imōto ga Konna ni Kawaii Wake ga Nai.	Ayase Aragaki, Ayaka Fujisaki	
2013	Red Data Girl	Izumiko Suzuhara	
2013	The World God Only Knows: Goddesses	Haqua du Lot Herminium	
2013	Leviathan The Last Defense	Leviathan	
2013	Sword Art Online: Extra Edition	Sachi	
2014	Battle Spirits: Saikyou Ginga Ultimate Zero	Principal	
2014	Buddy Complex	Hina Yumihara, Hina Ryazan	
2014	Buddy Complex Kanketsu-hen: Ano Sora ni Kaeru Mirai de	Hina Yumihara, Hina Ryazan	
2014	Danchi Tomoo	Mako-chan	
2014	Doraemon	Mrs. Cucumber	Episode 320
2014	Fairy Tail	Kagura Mikazuchi	
2014	Girl Friend Beta	Haruka Kazemachi	
2014	Glasslip	Yanagi Takayama	
2014	Initial D Final Stage	Mika Uehara	
2014	When Supernatural Battles Became Commonplace	Hatoko Kushikawa	
2014	Is the Order a Rabbit?	Aoyama Blue Mountain	
2014	Ludere Deorum	Yui Kusanagi	
2014	Nagi-Asu: A Lull in the Sea	Ojoshi-sama	
2014	Noragami	Tsuyu	
2014	Invaders of the Rokujyōma!?	Ruthkhania Nye Pardomshiha	
2014	Saki: The Nationals	Komaki Jindai	
2014	Your Lie in April	Emi Igawa	
2014	Soul Eater Not!	Anya Hepburn	
2014	The Comic Artist and Assistants	Sahoto Ashisu	
2014	The Irregular at Magic High School	Miyuki Shiba	
2014	The Pilot's Love Song	Sharon Morcos	
2014	Tsukimonogatari	Yotsugi Ononoki	
2015	Snow White with the Red Hair	Shirayuki	
2015	Gunslinger Stratos: The Animation	Lyudmila N Ignatova	
2015	Hero Bank	Masa Osoreya	
2015	Sound! Euphonium	Haruka Ogasawara	
2015	Is It Wrong to Try to Pick Up Girls in a Dungeon?	Ryu Lion	
2015	Is the Order a Rabbit??	Aoyama Blue Mountain	
2015	Castle Town Dandelion	Karen Ayugase	
2015	Magical Girl Lyrical Nanoha ViVid	Ginga Nakajima	
2015	Minna Atsumare! Falcom Gakuen SC	Emma Millstein	
2015	Noragami Aragoto	Tsuyu	
2015	One-Punch Man	Fubuki	
2015	Owarimonogatari	Yotsugi Ononoki	
2015	Seraph of the End	Shinoa Hīragi	
2015	Show by Rock!!	A	
2015	The Idolmaster Cinderella Girls	Kaede Takagaki	
2015	The Rolling Girls	Mamechiyo	
2015	Unlimited Fafnir	Honoka Tachikawa	
2015	Ushio and Tora	Akiyo Takatori	
2015	Utawarerumono: The False Faces	Munechika	
2015	My Teen Romantic Comedy SNAFU Too!	Yukino Yukinoshita	
2015	Yamada-kun and the Seven Witches	Urara Shiraishi	
2016	Ange Vierge	Aurora	
2016	Big Order	Mari Kunō	
2016	Doraemon	Girl C (ep 371), Student 2 (ep 392)	
2016	Gundam Build Fighters Try: Island Wars	Aila Jyrkiainen	
2016	Hitori no Shita the outcast	Feng Baobao / Fū Hōhō	
2016	Magical Girl Raising Project	Nana Habutae / Sister Nana	
2016	Witchy Pretty Cure!	Ha-chan /Kotoha Hanami/Cure Felice, Cat	
2016	Myriad Colors Phantom World	Reina Izumi	
2016	Show by Rock!! Short!!	A	
2016	Show by Rock!! #	A	
2016	Sound! Euphonium 2	Haruka Ogasawara	
2016	Snow White with the Red Hair 2nd Season	Shirayuki	
2016	Izetta: The Last Witch	Ortfiné "Finé" Fredericka von Eylstadt	
2016	Sweetness and Lightning	Kotori Iida	
2016	Ushio and Tora 2nd Season	Akiyo Takatori	
2017	6HP / Six Hearts Princess	Gold Princess	
2017	Anonymous Noise	Nino Arisugawa	
2017	Battle Girl High School	Kurumi Tokiwa	
2017	Boruto: Naruto Next Generations	Himawari Uzumaki	
2017	Code:Realize ~Sousei no Himegimi~	Cardia	
2017	The Idolmaster Cinderella Girls Gekijō	Kaede Takagaki	
2017	ĒlDLIVE	Misuzu Sonokata	
2017	Fate/Apocrypha	Archer of Red/Atalanta	
2017	Fuuka	Koyuki Hinashi	
2017	Hand Shakers	Shigure	
2017	Jūni Taisen	Misaki Yūki/Monkey	
2017	Land of the Lustrous	Goshenite	
2017	Masamune-kun's Revenge	Kojūrō Shuri	
2017	Puzzle & Dragons X	Burning Time Dragonbound, Myr	
2017	Yōjo Senki: Saga of Tanya the Evil	Viktoriya Ivanovna Serebryakov (Visha)	
2017	Kakegurui	Yumeko Jabami	
2017	Owarimonogatari II	Yotsugi Ononoki	
2017	The Ancient Magus' Bride	Leanan Sídhe	
2018	A Place Further than the Universe	Yuzuki Shiraishi	
2018	Basilisk: The Ōka Ninja Scrolls	Hachisu	
2018	Darling in the Franxx	Kokoro	
2018	Mitchiri Neko	Ribbon	
2018	Shiyan Pin Jiating	Ashise	
2018	Hakyu Hoshin Engi	Ryuukitsu Koushu	
2018	Cells at Work!	Regulatory T Cell	
2018	Hitori no Shita: The Outcast 2	Feng Baobao / Fū Hōhō	
2018	Future Card Buddyfight Ace	Mel Yumegatari	
2018	Detective Conan	Midori Furuoka	
2018	Double Decker! Doug & Kirill	Dina del Rio / "Pink"	
2018	Release the Spyce	Dolte	
2018	Radiant	Ulmina Bagliore	
2018	Layton Mystery Tanteisha: Katori no Nazotoki File	Samatha	Episode 31
2018	Ace Attorney Season 2	Viola Cadaverini	
2019	The Price of Smiles	Stella Shining	
2019	Kakegurui XX	Yumeko Jabami	
2019	One-Punch Man 2	Fubuki	
2019	Isekai Quartet	Viktoriya Ivanovna Serebryakov (Visha)	
2019	The Rising of the Shield Hero	Therese Alexanderite	
2019	To the Abandoned Sacred Beasts	Beatrice (Siren)	
2019	Astra Lost in Space	Yun-Hua Lu	
2019	Is It Wrong to Try to Pick Up Girls in a Dungeon? II	Ryu Lion	
2019	Demon Slayer: Kimetsu no Yaiba	Shinobu Kochō	
2019	Welcome to Demon School! Iruma-kun	Azazel Ameri	
2019	Fate/Grand Order - Absolute Demonic Front: Babylonia	Ushiwakamaru	
2020	Bofuri	Kasumi	
2020	Somali and the Forest Spirit	Uzoi	
2020	Isekai Quartet 2	Viktoriya Ivanovna Serebryakov (Visha)	
2020	Radiant 2nd Season	Ulmina Bagliore	
2020	GeGeGe no Kitarō (2018)	Uoko Hito	Episode 90
2020	Tower of God	Rachel	
2020	Motto! Majime ni Fumajime Kaiketsu Zorori	Rose	
2020	Sakura Wars the Animation	Clarissa "Claris" Snowflake	
2020	My Next Life as a Villainess: All Routes Lead to Doom!	Maria Campbell	
2020	Tsugu Tsugumomo	Ouhi Oriobana	
2020	My Teen Romantic Comedy SNAFU Climax	Yukino Yukinoshita	
2020	Uzaki-chan Wants to Hang Out!	Tsuki Uzaki	
2020	Fire Force Season 2	Puppeteer (Dominions' older sister)	
2020	The Irregular at Magic High School: Visitor Arc	Miyuki Shiba	
2020	Dragon Quest: The Adventure of Dai	Leona	
2020	By the Grace of the Gods	Elise	
2020	Is It Wrong to Try to Pick Up Girls in a Dungeon? III	Ryu Lion	
2020	Is the Order a Rabbit? BLOOM	Aoyama Blue Mountain	
2020	Kaeru no Pickles: Kimochi no Iro	A college student in cute beret	
2020	Jujutsu Kaisen	Tsumiki Fushiguro	
2020	Sleepy Princess in the Demon Castle	Narrator, Debiakuma, Goodereste's queen	
2021	Show by Rock!! Stars!!	A	
2021	Cells at Work!!	Regulatory T Cell	
2021	SK8 the Infinity	Emma, Girl	Episode 6
2021	So I'm a Spider, So What?	D	
2021	Farewell, My Dear Cramer	Mizuki Kaji	
2021	Motto! Majime ni Fumajime Kaiketsu Zorori 2nd Season	Rose	
2021	86	Anju Emma	
2021	Battle Athletes Victory ReSTART!	Anna Christopher	
2021	Welcome to Demon School! Iruma-kun Season 2	Azazel Ameri	
2021	My Next Life as a Villainess: All Routes Lead to Doom! X	Maria Campbell	
2021	The Honor Student at Magic High School	Miyuki Shiba	
2021	Tsukimichi: Moonlit Fantasy	Emma	
2021	I'm Standing on a Million Lives Season 2	Glenda Carter	
2021	Night Head 2041	Emily Shinjō	
2021	One Piece	Yamato	
2021	Kimi to Fit Boxing	Lin	
2021	Selection Project	Akari Amasawa	
2021	My Senpai Is Annoying	Tōko Sakurai	
2021	Sakugan	Sina	
2021	The Irregular at Magic High School: Reminiscence Arc	Miyuki Shiba	
2022	Princess Connect! Re:Dive 2nd Season	Rei	
2022	Girls' Frontline	Vector	
2022	Black Rock Shooter: Dawn Fall	Dead Master	
2022	Deaimon	Hiiro Kisaichi	
2022	Heroines Run the Show	Chizuru Nakamura	
2022	Spy × Family	Yor Forger	
2022	Don't Hurt Me, My Healer!	Maria Deathflame	
2022	Motto! Majime ni Fumajime Kaiketsu Zorori 3rd Season	Rose	
2022	The Rising of the Shield Hero 2nd Season	Therese Alexanderite	
2022	Kaguya-sama: Love Is War -Ultra Romantic-	Momo Ryuju	
2022	The Maid I Hired Recently Is Mysterious	Yuuri	
2022	Utawarerumono: Mask of Truth	Munechika	
2022	RWBY: Ice Queendom	Ruby Rose	
2022	Is It Wrong to Try to Pick Up Girls in a Dungeon? IV The Labyrinth Arc	Ryu Lion	
2022	Legend of Mana: The Teardrop Crystal	Serafina	
2022	Welcome to Demon School! Iruma-kun Season 3	Azazel Ameri	
2022	Urusei Yatsura (2022)	Oyuki	
2022	Uzaki-chan Wants to Hang Out! ω	Tsuki Uzaki	
2022	Blue Lock	Reo's mother	
2023	Bofuri 2nd Season	Kasumi	
2023	The Fire Hunter	Kira	
2023	Is It Wrong to Try to Pick Up Girls in a Dungeon? IV Deep Chapter: Calamity Arc	Ryu Lion	
2023	Ayaka: A Story of Bonds and Wounds	Momoko Amamiya	
2023	Masamune-kun's Revenge R	Kojūrō Shuri	
2023	Dark Gathering	Castle H Ruins Spirit	
2023	Spy × Family Season 2	Yor Forger	
2023	Jujutsu Kaisen 2nd Season	Tsumiki Fushiguro	
2023	I'm Giving the Disgraced Noble Lady I Rescued a Crash Course in Naughtiness	Charlotte Evans	
2023	The Eminence in Shadow 2nd Season	Elisabeth	
2023	My Daughter Left the Nest and Returned an S-Rank Adventurer	Angeline	
2023	Gamera Rebirth	Emiko Melchiorri	
2023	Shy	Inori	
2023	Zenryoku Usagi	Nee-san	
2024	Delicious in Dungeon	Falin Touden	
2024	The Witch and the Beast	Phanora Kristoffel	
2024	Mashle: The Divine Visionary Candidate Exam Arc	Sophina Biblia	
2024	Tsukimichi: Moonlit Fantasy Season 2	Emma	
2024	Urusei Yatsura (2022) 2nd Season	Oyuki	
2024	The Unwanted Undead Adventurer	Mysterious Woman	
2024	The Irregular at Magic High School 3rd Season	Miyuki Shiba	
2024	Red Cat Ramen	Krishna	
2024	Failure Frame: I Became the Strongest and Annihilated Everything with Low-Level Spells	Hijiri Takao	
2024	Pseudo Harem	Rin Nanakura	
2024	Bye Bye, Earth	Shelly	
2024	365 Days to the Wedding	Rika Honjoji	
2024	Loner Life in Another World	Angelica	
2025	I'm a Noble on the Brink of Ruin, So I Might as Well Try Mastering Magic	Jodi	
2025	Sakamoto Days	Osaragi	
2025	Witchy Pretty Cure!! Mirai Days	Kotoha Hanami/Cure Felice, Hisui	
2025	Sword of the Demon Hunter: Kijin Gentōshō	Shirayuki	
2025	Miru: Paths to My Future	Umi Nagahama	
2025	The Unaware Atelier Master	Marlefiss	
2025	April Showers Bring May Flowers	Hana Tabata	
2025	With You and the Rain	Fuji	
2025	See You Tomorrow at the Food Court	Saitō	
2025	Bad Girl	Yume Izumi	
2025	Hero Without a Class: Who Even Needs Skills?!	Laina	
2025	A Mangaka's Weirdly Wonderful Workplace	Yuzuki Hazama	
2025	Gnosia	Stella	
2025	Isekai Quartet 3	Viktoriya Ivanovna Serebryakov (Visha)	
2026	Kunon the Sorcerer Can See	Kunon Gurion	
2026	Tamon's B-Side	Utage Kinoshita	
2026	Scum of the Brave	Lord Storm Coffin	
2026	An Adventurer's Daily Grind at Age 29	Sekihime	
2026	Jujutsu Kaisen 3rd Season	Tsumiki Fushiguro	
2026	Always a Catch!	Aida Amethis	
2026	Fist of the North Star	Yuria	
2026	Draw This, Then Die!	Rei Teshima	
2026	Love Unseen Beneath the Clear Night Sky	Koharu Fuyutsuki	
2026	The World's Strongest Rearguard	Suzuna	
2026	Daemons of the Shadow Realm	Oshira	
2026	The Ogre's Bride	Yuzu Shinonome	
2026	Yōjo Senki: Saga of Tanya the Evil II	Viktoriya Ivanovna Serebryakov (Visha)	
2026	Tank Chair	Touko Kurosaka	
2026	Magic Knight Rayearth	Princess Émeraude	
2026	Ranma 1/2 3rd Season	Satsuki Miyakoji	
2026	Horror Collector	Himitsu	
2027	Welcome to Demon School! Iruma-kun: IruMafia Edition	Ameri	
2027	Witch and Mercenary	Siasha	
2027	Blade & Bastard	Ainikki	

=== Original net animation (ONA) ===
Year	Title	Role
2014	Shinra Banshō Choco	Noin
2015	The town you live in. – Bunkyo / Waseda	Phoebe
2015	Jaku-San-Sei Million Arthur	Kurumin
2016	Koyomimonogatari	Yotsugi Ononoki
2016	Jaku-San-Sei Million Arthur	Paradise
2016	The Container of Promise: First Love in Arita	Nao Akiyama
2016	The Oath of Winter, The Festival of Summer: The Great Camphor Tree of Takeo	Nao Akiyama
2016	Girlfriend Note	Haruka Kazemachi
2019	Levius	A.J. Langdon
2021	Vlad Love	Maki Watabe
2021	The Heike Story	Taira no Tokuko
2022	Kotaro Lives Alone	Mizuki Akitomo
2022	Spriggan	Lt. Col. Maria Clemente
2022	Gaiken Shijō Shugi	Kagawa Mirei
2022	Lupin Zero	Yōko
2023	Pole Princess!!	Noa Aoi
2023	Gamera Rebirth	Emiko
2024	Terminator Zero	Misaki
2024	Monogatari Series Off & Monster Season	Yotsugi Ononoki
2026	Yu-Gi-Oh! Card Game The Chronicles	Haine

=== Original video animation (OVA) ===
Year	Title	Role
2007	Indian Summer	Sumire Midō
2009	First Love Limited	Female student, Female staff member B
2010	Princess Resurrection	Hime
2010	Shakugan no Shana S	Seiko Ugaki
2010	Sora no Otoshimono	Ikaros
2010	Mazinkaizer SKL	Tsubasa Yuuki
2010	Megane na Kanojo	Mizuki Kimura
2011	Air Gear: Break on the Sky	Yayoi Nakayama
2011	Morita-san wa Mukuchi	Chihiro Miura
2012	A Channel + smile	Friend A
2012	A Town Where You Live: Twilight Intersection	Nanami Kanzaki
2012	Nagareboshi Lens	Yuriko Minami
2012	One Off	Sayo Kaburagi
2012	Code Geass: Akito the Exiled	Hilda Fagan
2013	Yahari Ore no Seishun Love Come wa Machigatteiru	Yukino Yukinoshita
2014	Noucome	Nozomi Katakoi
2014	Noragami	Tsuyu
2014	Girls und Panzer: This is the Real Anzio Battle!	Carpaccio
2014	The Comic Artist and Assistants Mini OVA series	Sahoto Ashisu
2014	Yamada-kun and the Seven Witches	Urara Shiraishi
2015	Cyborg 009 Vs. Devilman	Miki Makimura
2015	Owari no Seraph: Owaranai Seraph	Shinoa Hīragi
2015	Tokyo Ghoul: Jack	Uruka Minami
2015	Your Lie in April	Emi Igawa
2016	One-Punch Man	Fubuki
2016	Seraph of the End: Vampire Shahal	Shinoa Hīragi
2016	Snow White with the Red Hair	Shirayuki
2016	Mobile Suit Gundam: The Origin	Lalah Sune

=== Tokusatsu ===
Year	Title	Role
2026	Kamen Rider ZEZTZ	Phantom Gore Nightmare

=== Theatrical animation ===
Year	Title	Role
2009	Eden of The East Compilation: Air Communication	Saki Morimi
2009	Eden of the East the Movie I: The King of Eden	Saki Morimi
2010	Eden of the East the Movie II: Paradise Lost	Saki Morimi
2010	Naruto Shippuden the Movie: The Lost Tower	Sara
2010	Fate/stay night: Unlimited Blade Works	Announcer
2011	Xi AVANT	Nazo no Shoujo
2011	Sora no Otoshimono the Movie: The Angeloid of Clockwork	Ikaros
2011	Towa no Quon	Kiri
2011	Bannō Yasai Ninninman	Mari-chan
2013	Crayon Shin-chan: Very Tasty! B-class Gourmet Survival!!	Caviar
2013	Anohana: The Flower We Saw That Day	Chiriko "Tsuruko" Tsurumi
2013	Combustible	Owaka
2013	Star Driver: The Movie	Wako Agemaki
2013	Hinata no Aoshigure	Shigure
2014	Sora no Otoshimono Final: Eternal My Master	Ikaros
2015	Ongaku Shōjo	Sakura Nakayama
2015	Boruto: Naruto the Movie	Himawari Uzumaki
2015	Girls und Panzer der Film	Carpaccio
2016	Sound! Euphonium: The Movie – Welcome to the Kitauji High School Concert Band	Haruka Ogasawara
2016	A Silent Voice	Shōko Nishimiya
2016	Witchy Pretty Cure! The Movie: Wonderous! Cure Mofurun!	Kotoha Hanami / Cure Felice
2016	Gantz: O	Reika
2017	Blame!	Sanakan
2017	Haikara-San: Here Comes Miss Modern Part 1	Benio Hanamura
2017	Pretty Cure Dream Stars!	Kotoha Hanami / Cure Felice
2017	Kirakira Pretty Cure a la Mode the Movie: Crisply! The Memory of Mille-feuille!	Kotoha Hanami / Cure Felice
2017	The Irregular at Magic High School: The Movie – The Girl Who Summons the Stars	Miyuki Shiba
2018	Pretty Cure Super Stars!	Kotoha Hanami / Cure Felice
2018	Haikara-San: Here Comes Miss Modern Part 2	Benio Hanamura
2018	Doraemon the Movie: Nobita's Treasure Island	Vivi
2018	Hug! Pretty Cure Futari wa Pretty Cure: All Stars Memories	Kotoha Hanami / Cure Felice
2018	Godzilla: The Planet Eater	Haruka Sakaki
2018	Zoku Owarimonogatari	Yotsugi Ononoki
2019	Saga of Tanya the Evil: The Movie	Viktoriya Ivanovna Serebryakov (Visha)
2020	Burn the Witch	Macy Baljure
2020	Happy-Go-Lucky Days	Yuri
2020	Over the Sky	Kiku-chan
2021	Hula Fulla Dance	Mari
2023	Pretty Guardian Sailor Moon Cosmos The Movie	Kō Taiki / Sailor Star Maker
2023	Komada: A Whisky Family	Rui Komada
2023	Pretty Cure All Stars F	Kotoha Hanami / Cure Felice
2023	My Next Life as a Villainess: All Routes Lead to Doom! The Movie	Maria Campbell
2023	Spy × Family Code: White	Yor Forger / Thorn Princess
2024	Overlord: The Sacred Kingdom	Calca Bessarez
2024	Wonderful Pretty Cure! The Movie: A Grand Adventure in a Thrilling Game World!	Kotoha Hanami / Cure Felice
2025	The Rose of Versailles	Rosalie Lamorlière
2025	Demon Slayer: Kimetsu no Yaiba – The Movie: Infinity Castle	Shinobu Kocho
2026	Cosmic Princess Kaguya!	Yachiyo Runami
2026	Mobile Suit Gundam: Hathaway – The Sorcery of Nymph Circe	Kelia Dace
2026	Grotesqqque	Hikarin
2026	Expelled from Paradise: Resonance from the Heart	Alma

=== Drama CDs ===
Year	Title	Role
2007	Indian Summer Maniacs CD1	Sumire Midō
2007	Soul Nomad & the World Eaters Drama CD 〜 Kyūtei Majutsu-Shi Yōdo no Kareinaru! Dai Bōken 〜	SS member of Aquatic Group
2007	Touka Gettan Hanageki Sōshi "Fight"	Momoka Kawakabe
2007	Touka Gettan Hanageki Sōshi "Love"	Momoka Kawakabe
2008	Indian Summer Maniacs CD2	Sumire Midō
2008	Dear Girl〜Stories〜 Hibiki	Sayaka
2008	Sekirei Sound Stage 01.02	Musubi
2009	Itsuka Tenma no Kuro Usagi Drama CD	Haruka Shigure
2009	ELEMENT GIRLS Genso Shūki Moete Oboeru Kagaku no Kihon	Oxygen
2009	The Ambition of Oda Nobuna	Inuchiyo Maeda
2009	H+P -HimePara	Sakurako Kamiku
2009	Wagamama Sentai Bloom Heart!	Sakura Kazama/Pink Cherry
2010	Oreimo	Ayase Aragaki
2010	Arian Rodd Saga: Fan Book Fellowship of Stone Drama CD	Elsa Brooks/Fairy of Wisdom
2010	Itsuka Tenma no Kuro Usagi Drama CD 2	Haruka Shigure
2010	MM! Drama CD "Emu Biyori ~tsu!"	Arashiko Yuno
2010	MC ☆ Aku Shizu Drama CD "Bishōjo Heiki F-X Haorenoyome!"	F/A – 18 E Hōnetto-san
2010	Kazoku Game	Makoto Yusa
2010	Fight! Don't Disappear!! Shikiso Usuko San Drama CD	Usuko Shikiso
2010	Shizukanaru Don – Yakuza Side Story	Akemi Akino
2010	Jinki: Extend Relation	Akao Hiiragi
2010	Persona 3 Portable Vol.1	Rio Iwasaki
2010	Loveplus Sound Portrait Takane Manaka	Takane Manaka
2011	Kaii Ikasama Hakurantei	Yatsude
2011	Griotte no Nemurihime	Shitora
2011	Tsuki Tsuki!	Hijiri Gogyou
2011	Tonari no Kaibutsu-kun	Chizuru Oshima
2011	My Teen Romantic Comedy SNAFU	Yukino Yukinoshita
2011	Quad Cross Episode 1 "Akatsuki no Mabuta"	Luca Lirra
2012	When Hikaru was on the Earth	Asai Saiga
2012	Mahouka Koukou no Rettousei Audio Drama DVD	Miyuki Shiba
2012	Paru Ko Engekibu	Naoko Kōgami
2012	Hime Hime Booking! Motion Drama CD	Fee
2012	Dear Girl〜Stories〜 Hibiki Drama CD: The Final	Sayaka
2012	Quad Cross Episode 2 "Kyōzō no Haha"	Luca Lirra
2013	The Idolmaster Cinderella Girls Comic Anthology cool Vol. 2 with cool Drama CD	Kaede Takagaki
2013	Kōmei no Yome	Ei Kōgetsu
2013	Shishunki Seimeitai Vega	Tanabe
2013	Tari Tari Drama CD: Tabidachi no Uta	Sawa Okita
2014	Mahouka Koukou no Rettousei: Out of Order	Miyuki Shiba
2014	Rokujyoma no Shinryakusha	Ruthkhania Nye Pardomshiha
2014	Z/X -Zillions of enemy X- NC DramaCD 2 "Dramiko Quintet"	Barahara Black Dragon Miko
2014	Anthology Drama CD Tales of Xillia 2 2014 Summer	Leia Rolando
2014	Fukumenkei Noise	Nino Arisugawa
2014	Buddy Complex Drama CD Final	Hina Ryazan
2014	Glasslip Drama CD: Monogatari no Kakera	Yanagi Takayama
2014	Fate/EXTRA CCC Lunatic Station 2013	Meltryllis
2014	The Idolm@ster Cinderella Girls 2nd Live Party M@gic!! Party M@gic Special Drama CD Party Time wa Owaranai	Kaede Takagaki
2015	Anthology Drama CD Tales of Xillia 2 2014 Winter	Leia Rolando
2015	Iono-sama Fanatics	Mioto
2015	0-Noushiya Minato	Saya Yamagami
2015	Tales of Xillia 2 Bipolar Crossroads Part 2	Leia Rolando
2015	Ange Vierge: Drama and Song "Tsunagaru Kizuna"	Aurora
2015	Psycho-Pass: Kanshikan Shinya Kogami	Tsubasa Torii
2015	Seraph of the End	Shinoa Hīragi
2015	Rokujyoma no Shinryakusha	Ruthkhania Nye Pardomshiha
2015	Yamada-kun and the Seven Witches	Urara Shiraishi
2015	Inō-Battle wa Nichijō-kei no Naka de	Hatoko Kushikawa
2015	Kono Subarashii Sekai ni Shukufuku o!	Wiz
2015	Hibike! Euphonium	Haruka Ogasawara
2015	Fairy Tail (2014)	Kagura Mikazuchi
2016	Snow White with the Red Hair	Shirayuki
2016	Anthology Drama CD Tales of Xillia 2 2015 Winter	Leia Rolando
2016	First Lottery Premium Idolmaster Cinderella Girls Part 2 E Prize Original Drama CD	Kaede Takagaki
2016	E-Capcom Limited Edition – Ace Attorney 6 Limited Edition Drama CD	Leifa Padma Kurain
2016	Maho Girls PreCure! Drama & Character Song Album Dream ☆ Arch	Kotohae Hanami/Cure Felice
2016	RealTime-LOG #04	Haruna Komori
2017	Hachinan tte, Sore wa Nai Deshou! 10.5 Drama CD Booklet	Elise
2022	Hanikami, Kanojo wa Koi o Suru ～ Hana Mihen	Kasane Minazumi

=== Digital comics ===
- Fly High!, Meru Tachibana
- Demon Love Spell, Miiko
- Super Heroine Gakuen, Haruka Gōriki

=== Video games ===
Year	Title	Role	Platform
2009	Loveplus	Manaka Takane	Nintendo DS
2010	Sora no Otoshimono Forte: Heart-Throbbing Summer Vacation	Ikaros	PlayStation Portable
2010	Memories Off: Yubikiri no Kioku	Shiina Kodou	Xbox 360
2011	Sora no Otoshimono Forte: Dreamy Season	Ikaros	Nintendo DS
2011	Marvel vs. Capcom 3: Fate of Two Worlds	Lei-Lei/Hsien-Ko	Xbox 360, PlayStation 3
2011	Tales of Xillia	Leia Rolando	PlayStation 3
2011	Ultimate Marvel vs. Capcom 3	Lei-Lei/Hsien-Ko	Xbox 360, PlayStation 3, PlayStation Vita
2012	Rune Factory 4	Piko	Nintendo 3DS
2012	Shining Blade	Elmina	PlayStation Portable
2012	Project X Zone	Lei-Lei/Hsien-Ko	Nintendo 3DS
2012	Tales of Xillia 2	Leia Rolando	PlayStation 3
2012	Under Night In-Birth	Orie	PlayStation 3, Arcade
2012	E.X. Troopers	Tiki	Nintendo 3DS, PlayStation 3
2013	The Idolmaster Cinderella Girls	Kaede Takagaki	Mobile game
2013	Ange Vierge: The Second Disciplinary Committee Girls Battle	Aurora	Mobile game
2013	Getsuei Gakuen: Kou	Eiri Mizuki	PlayStation Vita
2013	Girl Friend Beta	Haruka Kazemachi	Mobile game
2013	Gunslinger Stratos	Lyudmila N Ignatova	Arcade, PC
2013	Fate/Extra CCC	Meltryllis	PlayStation Portable
2013	Shining Ark	Kilmaria	PlayStation Portable
2013	Super Robot Wars UX	Tsubasa Yuuki	Nintendo 3DS
2013	Disorder 6	Shina	PlayStation 3, Xbox 360
2013	Yahari Game demo Ore no Seishun Love Come wa Machigatteiru.	Yukino Yukinoshita	PlayStation Vita
2013	Demon Gaze	Fran Pendoll	PlayStation Vita
2013	The Legend of Heroes: Trails of Cold Steel	Emma Millstein	PlayStation 3, PlayStation 4, PlayStation Vita, PC
2014	Dengeki Bunko: Fighting Climax	Miyuki Shiba	
2014	Corpse Party: Blood Drive	Kuon Niwa	
2014	Gunslinger Stratos 2	Lyudmila N Ignatova	Arcade, PC
2014	Mahouka Koukou no Rettousei: LOST ZERO	Miyuki Shiba	Mobile game
2014	Mahouka Koukou no Rettousei: Out of Order	Miyuki Shiba	PlayStation Vita
2014	Phantasy Star Nova	Juno	PlayStation Vita
2014	Shining Resonance	Kirika	PlayStation 3
2014	The Legend of Heroes: Trails of Cold Steel II	Emma Millstein	PlayStation 3, PlayStation 4, PlayStation Vita, PC
2015	Battle Girl High School	Kurumi Tokiwa	Mobile game
2015	BlazBlue Chrono Phantasma Extend	Mai Natsume	PlayStation 3, PlayStation 4, PlayStation Vita, Xbox One, PC
2015	Bloodborne: The Old Hunters	Plain Doll, Lady Maria of the Astral Clocktower	PlayStation 4
2015	Devil May Cry 4: Special Edition	Kyrie	PlayStation 4, Xbox One, PC
2015	Fate/Grand Order	Atalanta, Atalanta (Alter), Ushiwakamaru, Ushiwakamaru (Assassin), Martha, Meltryllis, Mysterious Alter Ego Λ, Taira no Kagekiyo	Mobile game
2015	Tokyo Mirage Sessions ♯FE	Caeda	Wii U
2015	JoJo's Bizarre Adventure: Eyes of Heaven	Daiya Higashikata	PlayStation 3, PlayStation 4
2015	Kantai Collection	Graf Zeppelin, Hagikaze	
2015	Princess Connect!	Rei Shijo	Mobile game
2015	Sengoku Taisen 1615 Oosaka Moyu Yo ha Yumeno Gotoku	Irohahime (Tony.ver)	Arcade
2015	Owari no Seraph: BLOODY BLADES	Shinoa Hīragi	Mobile game
2015	Owari no Seraph: Unmei no Hajimari	Shinoa Hīragi	PlayStation Vita
2015	Syanago Collection	Tesla Model S/Tesla Model S P85D, Suzuki Wagon R/Suzuki Wagon R Stingray	Mobile Game
2015	Utawarerumono: Itsuwari no Kamen	Munechika	PlayStation 3, PlayStation 4, PlayStation Vita
2016	Phoenix Wright: Ace Attorney – Spirit of Justice	Rayfa Padma Khura'in	Nintendo 3DS
2016	BlazBlue: Central Fiction	Mai Natsume	PlayStation 3, PlayStation 4, PC
2016	Sengoku Taisen 1477–1615 Hinomoto Ittou he no Gunki-	Irohahime (Tony.ver), Katsurahime, Yamate-dono	Arcade
2016	Utawarerumono: Futari no Hakuoro	Munechika	PlayStation 3, PlayStation 4, PlayStation Vita
2016	Yahari Game demo Ore no Seishun Love Kome wa Machigatteiru. Zoku	Yukino Yukinoshita	PlayStation Vita
2016	After School Girls Tribe	Sakuya Kanzaki	Mobile game
2016	Shadowverse	Ancient Elf, Silver Bolt	Mobile game
2016	Girls' Frontline	Vector	Mobile game
2017	Valkyria Revolution	Ophelia Augusta Jutland	PlayStation 4, PlayStation Vita
2017	ShinNaZuki	Linsy	Mobile game
2017	Onmyōji	Hana	Mobile game
2017	Fire Emblem Heroes	Caeda	iOS, Android
2017	God Wars: Future Past	Kaguya	PlayStation 4, PlayStation Vita
2017	Fire Emblem Warriors	Caeda	Nintendo Switch, New Nintendo 3DS
2017	Infinite Stratos: Archetype Breaker	Vishnu Isa Galaxy	Mobile game
2017	The Alchemist Code	Chloe	Mobile game
2017	Mabinogi Heroes	Miri (Japan)	PC
2017	Xenoblade Chronicles 2	Fan la Norne, Lora	Nintendo Switch
2017	Another Eden	Mariel, Parisa	iOS, Android
2017	Magia Record: Puella Magi Madoka Magica Side Story	Oriko Mikuni, Mabayu Aki	iOS, Android
2017	The Legend of Heroes: Trails of Cold Steel III	Emma Millstein	PlayStation 4, PC, Nintendo Switch
2018	BlazBlue: Cross Tag Battle	Ruby Rose, Orie, Mai Natsume	PlayStation 4, Nintendo Switch, PC
2018	Langrisser Mobile	Luna	Mobile Game
2018	Xenoblade Chronicles 2: Torna – The Golden Country	Lora, Haze	Nintendo Switch
2018	Valkyria Chronicles 4	Minerva Victor	PlayStation 4, Xbox One, Nintendo Switch
2018	Soukou Musume	Karina Mikazuki	Mobile game
2018	Dragalia Lost	Elisanne	Mobile game
2018	Fitness Boxing	Rin	Nintendo Switch
2018	Food Fantasy	Cheese	Mobile game
2018	The Legend of Heroes: Trails of Cold Steel IV	Emma Millstein	PlayStation 4
2018	The King of Fighters All Star	Ein	Mobile game
2018	Princess Connect! Re:Dive	Rei	Mobile game
2019	Sword Art Online: Fatal Bullet	Sachi	PlayStation 4, Xbox One, PC, Nintendo Switch
2019	Ace Combat 7: Skies Unknown	Ionela	PlayStation 4, Xbox One, PC
2019	Azur Lane: Crosswave	Shimakaze	PlayStation 4, PC
2019	Code Vein	Eva Roux	PlayStation 4, Xbox One, PC
2019	Warriors Orochi 4 Ultimate	Gaia	Nintendo Switch, PlayStation 4, PC
2019	DanMachi: Memoria Freese	Ryu Lion	Mobile game
2019	Arknights	Pramanix	Mobile game
2019	Sakura Wars	Clarissa "Claris" Snowflake	PlayStation 4
2019	Iron Saga	Guinevere	Mobile Game
2019	13 Sentinels: Aegis Rim	Ryoko Shinonome	PlayStation 4
2020	Tekken 7	Kunimitsu	PlayStation 4, PC, Xbox One
2020	Genshin Impact	Ayaka Kamisato (Note: This character is officially known in-game as Kamisato Ayaka.)	PlayStation 4, PlayStation 5, PC, Mobile game
2020	Demon's Souls	Maiden in Black	PlayStation 5
2020	The Legend of Heroes: Trails into Reverie	Emma Millstein	PlayStation 4, PC, Nintendo Switch
2020	Fitness Boxing 2: Rhythm and Exercise	Rin	Nintendo Switch
2021	Birdie Crush	Martina Glow	Mobile Game
2021	Demon Slayer: Kimetsu no Yaiba – The Hinokami Chronicles	Shinobu Kocho	PlayStation 4, PlayStation 5, PC, Xbox One, Xbox Series X/S
2021	Shin Megami Tensei V	Tao Isonokami	Nintendo Switch
2021	Genshin Impact	Kamisato Ayaka	PlayStation 4, PlayStation 5, PC, Mobile game
2021	Azur Lane	Shimakaze	Mobile game
2021	Counter:Side	Elizabeth Pendragon	iOS, Android, PC
2021	Super Robot Wars 30	Mitsuba Greyvalley	PlayStation 4, Nintendo Switch, PC
2021	The Idolmaster Starlit Season	Kaede Takagaki	PlayStation 4, PC
2022	Monochrome Mobius: Rights and Wrongs Forgotten	Munechika	PlayStation 5, PlayStation 4, PC
2022	Valkyrie Elysium	Taika	PlayStation 5, PlayStation 4, PC
2023	Fire Emblem Engage	Chloé	Nintendo Switch
2023	Blue Archive	Nagisa Kirifuji	Mobile game
2024	Granblue Fantasy: Relink	Maglielle	PlayStation 5, PlayStation 4, PC
2024	Metaphor: ReFantazio	Eiselin Burchelli Meijal Hulkenberg	PlayStation 5, Xbox Series X/S, PC
2024	Inazuma Eleven: Victory Road	Rean	Nintendo Switch, PlayStation 5, Xbox Series X/S, PC, iOS, Android
2024	Girl's Frontline 2: Exilium	Vector	Microsoft Windows, iOS, Android
2024	Final Fantasy XIV: Dawntrail	Halmarut	Microsoft Windows, macOS, PlayStation 4, PlayStation 5, Xbox Series X/S
2025	Puella Magi Madoka Magica: Magia Exedra	Oriko Mikuni, Mabayu Aki, Yotsugi Ononoki (added in 2026)	Microsoft Windows, iOS, Android

=== Dubbing ===
==== Live-action ====
- 100 Days My Prince (Yeon Hong-shim / Yoon Yi-seo (Nam Ji-hyun))
- 1987: When the Day Comes (Yeon-hee (Kim Tae-ri))
- Around the World in 80 Days (Abigail Fix Fortescue (Leonie Benesch))
- Avatar: Fire and Ash (Kiri (Sigourney Weaver))
- Avatar: The Way of Water (Kiri (Sigourney Weaver))
- Barbie (Sasha (Ariana Greenblatt))
- The Beguiled (Alicia (Elle Fanning))
- Bet (Yumeko (Miku Martineau))
- Black Beauty (Jo Green (Mackenzie Foy))
- Black Panther: Wakanda Forever (Riri Williams / Ironheart (Dominique Thorne))
- Carrie (Sue Snell (Gabriella Wilde))
- The Conjuring (Judy Warren (Sterling Jerins))
- Death on the Nile (Rosalie Otterbourne (Letitia Wright))
- Debris (Isla Vandeberg (Alisha Newton))
- Dune: Part Two (Princess Irulan (Florence Pugh))
- The End of Oak Street (Audrey Platt (Maisy Stella))
- Free Guy (Millie / Molotov Girl (Jodie Comer))
- Fright Night 2: New Blood (Amy Peterson (Sacha Parkinson))
- Galveston (Rocky (Elle Fanning))
- Geek Charming (Dylan Schoenfield (Sarah Hyland))
- Genius (Marie Winteler (Shannon Tarbet))
- Gossip Girl (Kate Keller (Tavi Gevinson))
- The Great (Catherine the Great (Elle Fanning))
- Halo (Makee (Charlie Murphy))
- Heidi (Klara (Isabelle Ottmann))
- Home Alone: The Holiday Heist (Alexis Baxter (Jodelle Ferland))
- Hot Summer Nights (McKayla Strawberry (Maika Monroe))
- House of the Dragon (Princess Ryaenyra Targaryen (Emma D'Arcy))
- IF (Gummy Bear (Amy Schumer))
- Into the Storm (Kaitlyn (Alycia Debnam-Carey))
- Ironheart (Riri Williams / Ironheart (Dominique Thorne))
- Jurassic World Dominion (Gemma Zhao (Jasmine Chiu))
- The Knight of Shadows: Between Yin and Yang (Nie Xiaoqian (Zhong Chuxi))
- Legend of the Demon Cat (Mudan (Xu Chen))
- Longlegs (Lee Harker (Maika Monroe))
- The Lovely Bones (Susie Salmon (Saoirse Ronan))
- Mad Max Beyond Thunderdome (Savannah Nix (Helen Buday))
- Me and Earl and the Dying Girl (Rachel Kushner (Olivia Cooke))
- The Nevers (Penance Adair (Ann Skelly))
- The Nice Guys (Holly March (Angourie Rice))
- Outlander (Brianna "Bree" Randall (Sophie Skelton))
- Pacific Rim Uprising (Amara Namani (Cailee Spaeny))
- Parasite (2021 NTV edition) (Park Da-hye (Jung Ji-so))
- Parental Guidance (Harper Simmons (Bailee Madison))
- Pinocchio (Fabiana (Kyanne Lamaya))
- Predator: Badlands (Thia/Tessa (Elle Fanning))
- Rebecca (New Era Movies Edition) (Mrs. de Winter (Joan Fontaine))
- Resident Evil (Michelle (Sara Paxton))
- Roman Holiday (2022 NTV edition) (Princess Ann (Audrey Hepburn))
- The Running Man (Amelia Williams (Emilia Jones))
- Sisters in Arms (Zara (Dilan Gwyn))
- Spider-Man: Far From Home (E.D.I.T.H. (Dawn Michelle King))
- St. Elmo's Fire (2022 The Cinema edition) (Leslie Hunter (Ally Sheedy))
- Station Eleven (Kirsten Raymonde (Mackenzie Davis))
- They Found Hell (Trish (Katy Reece))
- The Untamed (Jiang Yanli (Xuan Lu))
- Vampire Dog (Skylar (Julia Sarah Stone))
- Venom: Let There Be Carnage (Frances Barrison / Shriek (Naomie Harris))
- Winter's Tale (Beverly Penn (Jessica Brown Findlay))
- Wonka (Lottie Bell (Rakhee Thakrar))

==== Animation ====
- The Boss Baby: Family Business (Staci)
- Comfyland (Feely)
- Lookism (Park Ha Neul/Mirei Kagawa)
- Marvel Zombies (Riri Williams)
- My Adventures with Superman (Kara Zor-El / Supergirl)
- RWBY (Ruby Rose)
- Smallfoot (Meechee)
- Smurfs (Smurfette)
- Wish Dragon (Li Na)

=== Anime-related songs ===
- Touka Gettan (TV series), theme song performance (OP/ED)
- Wagaya no Oinarisama. (TV series), theme song performance (ED)
- Sekirei (TV series), theme song Performance (OP/ED)
- Sekirei ~Pure Engagement~ (TV series), theme song performance (OP/ED)
- Sora no Otoshimono (TV series), theme song performance (OP/ED)
- Basquash! (TV series), theme song performance (OP – Eclipse)
- Towa no Quon (Movie Series), insert song performance
- MM! (TV series), theme song performance (OP/Shared)
- The World God Only Knows (TV series), theme song performance (ED/Shared)
- The World God Only Knows: Megami-Hen (TV series), theme song performance (OP)
- Yahari Ore no Seishun Love Come wa Machigatteiru (TV series), theme song performance (ED)
- Sword Art Online (TV series), character song performance
- The Idolmaster Cinderella Girls (video game), song performances
- E.X. Troopers (video game), theme song performance (insert song/ED)
- Phantasy Star (video game), theme song performance (ED)
- The Irregular at Magic High School (TV series), character song performances
- Yahari Ore no Seishun Love Come wa Machigatteiru. Zoku (TV series), theme song performance (ED)
- Show by Rock!! (video game, TV series), song performances
- Akagami no Shirayuki-hime (TV series), theme song performance (OP)
- Akagami no Shirayuki-hime 2nd Season (TV series), theme song performance (OP)
- Fukumenkei Noise, theme song performance (ED/insert/OP)
- Tsukimonogatari (TV series), theme song performance (OP)
- Fuuka (TV series), theme song performance (ED), character songs
- Yahari Ore no Seishun Love Come wa Machigatteiru. Kan (TV series), theme song performance (ED)
- RWBY: Ice Queendom (TV series), theme song performance (ED)
- Is It Wrong to Try to Pick Up Girls in a Dungeon? IV (TV series), theme song performance (ED/OP)
- I'm Giving the Disgraced Noble Lady I Rescued a Crash Course in Naughtiness (TV series), theme song performance (ED)
- Monogatari Series Off & Monster Season (ONA), theme song performance (OP)
- Pseudo Harem (TV series), theme song performance (ED)

== Discography ==
=== Singles ===
Release date	Title	Catalog No.			Peak chart positions		Album
Release date	Title	Artist edition	Anime edition	Regular edition	Oricon	Billboard Japan Hot 100	Album
August 12, 2015	Yasashii Kibou (やさしい希望)	1000572324	1000572325	1000572326	11	22	Live Love Laugh
February 3, 2016	Installation/Sono Koe ga Chizu ni Naru (その声が地図になる)	1000590446	1000590447	1000590448	10	39	Live Love Laugh
November 8, 2017	Yume no Hate Made (夢の果てまで)	1000691610	1000691611	1000691612	21	74	JUNCTION
March 28, 2018	Jewelry	1000705356		1000705357	14		JUNCTION
September 19, 2018	Atarashii Ashita (新しい朝)	1000724903		1000724903	18		JUNCTION
July 29, 2022	Guide (DanMachi IV ED)	1000815988		1000815988			
January 6, 2023	Shikou (視紅) (DanMachi IV OP)	1000823757		1000823757			

=== Albums ===
==== Studio albums ====
Year	Album details	Catalog No.			Peak chart positions	
Year	Album details	CD+Blu-ray edition	CD+DVD edition	Regular edition	Oricon	Billboard Japan Top Albums Sales
2016	Live Love Laugh: Released: May 25, 2016; Label: Warner Home Video; Format: CD	1000597870	1000597871	1000597872	6	6
2018	Junction: Released: December 19, 2018; Label: Warner Bros. Home Entertainment; Format: CD	1000729930	1000729931	1000729932		

==== Mini albums ====
Year	Album details	Catalog no.			Peak chart positions	
Year	Album details	CD+Blu-ray edition	CD+DVD edition	Regular edition	Oricon	Billboard Japan Top Albums Sales
2016	Live for Live: Released: December 21, 2016; Label: Warner Home Video; Format: CD	1000636464	1000636465	1000636466	21	18
2020	Sister Cities: Released: March 25, 2020; Label: Warner Bros. Home Entertainment; Format: CD				23	
2020	Garden: Released: September 2, 2020; Label: Warner Bros. Home Entertainment; Format: CD					

== Stage ==
Year	Title	Role	Note	Ref.
2024, 2026	Thanatos	Luna Walpole		

== Awards and nominations ==
Year	Award ceremony	Category	Nominee	Result	Ref.
2016	10th Seiyu Awards	Best Supporting Actress Award	Saori Hayami	Won	
2026	48th Anime Grand Prix	Best Voice Actor	Saori Hayami	Won	
