= Stefan Feller =

United Nations Police Adviser

Stefan Feller was the United Nations Police Adviser from 2013 to 2017. The United Nations Police Adviser has direct access to the Under-Secretary-General for Peacekeeping Operations, while accountable to the Assistant-Secretary-General for Rule of Law and Security Institutions.

Feller served previously as Police Commissioner in the United Nations Interim Administration Mission in Kosovo, the Head of the Police Unit in the Council of the European Union, and from 2008 to 2012, the Head of the European Union Police Mission in Bosnia and Herzegovina. He also maintains a blog on the Huffington Post.
