= Cai Xukun discography =

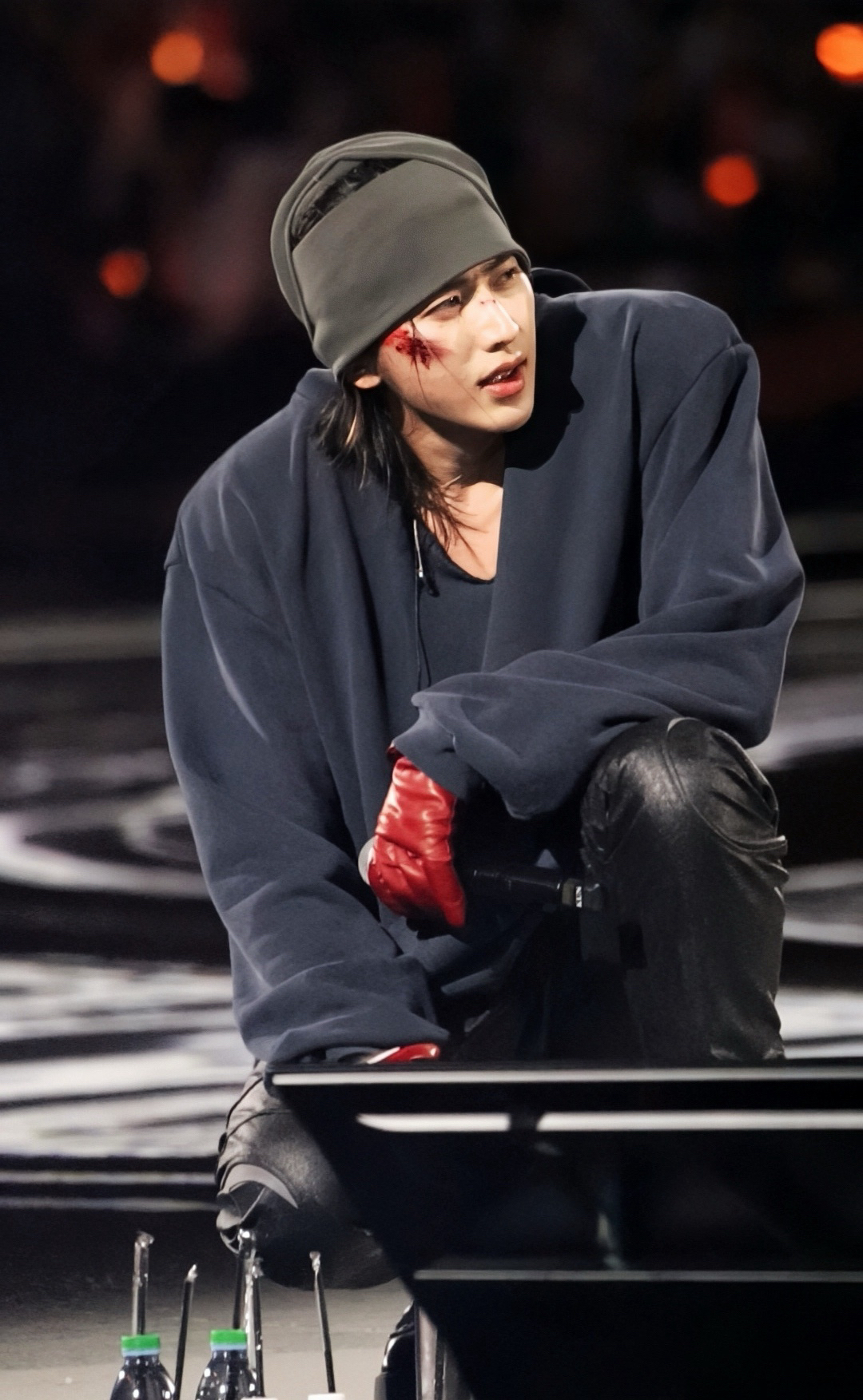
- Kun at The Deadman Concert Macau Talk
- Studio albums: 2
- EPs: 3
- Compilation albums: 1

This is the discography of Chinese singer Cai Xukun. His extended play Young (2019) was downloaded over 14 million times in China, while 11 of his songs reached number one on the Chinese record charts.

== Albums ==
=== Studio albums ===
Title	Album details	Sales
Lost (迷)	Released: April 13, 2021; Label: Cai Xukun Studio; Formats: Digital download, streaming; Track listing: 1. "Intro: #0000FF"; 2. "迷 (Lost)"; 3. "默片 (Silent Film)"; 4. "感受她 (Feeling Her)"; 5. "怪 (Play-Doh)"; 6. "欲 (Desire)"; 7. "Nobody Cares"; 8. "梦 (Dream)(Band ver.)" 9. "Interlude -"; 10. "HAHA"; 11. "Outro: 爱与痛 (Love and Pain)"	CHN: 3,478,860 (dig.)
KUN	Released: February 06, 2026; Label: Shenhe Media Limited and under exclusive to 88rising; Formats: Digital download, streaming; Track listing: 1. "Honour"; 2. "Deadman"; 3. "Jasmine"; 4. "Don't Call"; 5. "Back in Time"; 6. "What a Day"; 7. "Night into Night (interlude)" 8. "Paranoid"; 9. "Washed Away"; 10. "Colder"; 11. "Fool"	CHN:1,835,891 (dig.)

=== Live albums ===
Title	Details
2023 Art Lab Live	Released: February 27, 2023; Label: Kun Studio; Formats: Digital download, streaming; Track listing: 1. "Feel Her (Live)"; 2. "Lover (Live)"; 3. "Fan (Live)"; 4. "HAHA (Live)"; 5. "It's You (Live)"; 6. "Silent Film (Live)"; 7. "Nobody Cares (Live)"
2024 Art Lab Live	Released: June 15-16, Aug 05 2024; Label: Kun Studio; Formats: Digital download, streaming; Track listing: 1. "Afterglow (Live)"; 2. "Ride or Die (Live)"; 3. "Spotlight (Live)"; 4. "Hug Me (Live)"; 5. "Remedy "
Live at Apple Music Radio	Released: June 02,2026; Label:88rising; Formats: Digital download, streaming; Track listing: 1. "Colder (Live at Apple Music Radio)"; 2. "Deadman (Live at Apple Music Radio)"; 3. "Colder (Music Video Live at Apple Music Radio)"; 4. "Deadman (Music Video Live at Apple Music Radio)"

== Extended plays ==
Title	Details	Sales
1	Released: August 2, 2018; Label: Yongdiaoxing Entertainment; Formats: Digital download, streaming; Track listing: 1. "Pull Up"; 2. "It's You"; 3. "You Can Be My Girlfriend"	—N/a
Young	Released: July 26, 2019; Label: Jiamei Entertainment Group; Formats: Digital download, streaming; Track listing: 1. "Young"; 2. "蒙着眼 (Blindfolded)"	CHN: 14,583,056 (dig.)
Phenomenon	Released: February 24, 2023; Label: Kun Studio; Formats: Digital download, streaming; Track listing: 1. "前言 (Intro)"; 2. "现象 (Phenomenon)"; 3. "标签 (Title)"; 4. "修行 (Narcissism)"	—N/a

== Singles ==
Title	Year	Peak chart positions		Album
Title	Year	CHN TME	CHN Billb.	Album
"I Wanna Get Love"	2017	—	—	Non-album single
"Pull Up"	2018	26	1	1
"Wait Wait Wait"	2018	7	41	Non-album singles
"没有意外 (No Exception)"	2019	1	18	Non-album singles
"Bigger"	2019	2	31	Non-album singles
"Hard To Get"	2019	2	—	Non-album singles
"Young"	2019	2	—	Young
"梦 (Dream)"	2019	14	—	限定的记忆 (More Than Forever) (Note: "限定的记忆 (More Than Forever)" is an album by the Chinese boy group Nine Percent)
"重生 (Rebirth)"	2019	6	—	Non-album singles
"Home"	2020	3	—	Non-album singles
"情人 (Lover)"	2020	1	—	Non-album singles
"Lost" (迷)	2021	1	—	Lost
"抱我 (Hug Me)"	2022	7	—	Non-album single
"现象 (Phenomenon)"	2023	2	—	Phenomenon
"聚光灯 (Spotlight)"	2023	1	—	Non-album singles
"至死不渝 (Ride Or Die)"	2024	1	—	Non-album singles
"Afterglow"	2024	1	—	Non-album singles
"Remedy"	2024	2	—	Non-album singles
"Deadman"	2025	1	1	Non-album singles
"Jasmine"	2025	1	1	Non-album singles
"What a Day"	2025	1	1	Non-album singles
"—" denotes releases that did not chart or were not released in that region.

== Other charted songs ==
Title	Year	Peak chart positions	Album
Title	Year	CHN	Album
"You Can Be My Girlfriend"	2018	30	1
"It's You"	2018	35	1
"蒙着眼 (Blindfolded)"	2019	1	Young
"#000FF"	2021	5	迷
"默片"	2021	3	迷
"怪"	2021	1	迷
"感受她 (Feeling Her)"	2021	1	迷
"HAHA"	2021	30	迷
"梦 (Band.ver)"	2021	33	迷
"nobody cares"	2021	20	迷
"爱与痛 (Outro)"	2021	21	迷
"标签 (Title)"	2023	29	Phenomenon
"前言 (Intro)"	2023	86	Phenomenon
"修行 (Narcissism)"	2023	47	Phenomenon

== Soundtrack appearances ==
Title	Year	Peak chart positions	Album
Title	Year	CHN	Album
"一起笑出来 (Let's Laugh out Loud)" (with Jackie Chan)	2019	1	The Knight of Shadows: Between Yin and Yang OST

== Collaborations ==
Title	Year	Peak chart positions	Album
Title	Year	CHN	Album
"冬梦飞翔 (Flying Winter Dream)" (with Tong Liya and other artists) (Note: Promotional single for the 2022 Winter Olympic Games)	2019	—	Non-album single
"重生 (Original Mix)" (with KSHMR)	2020	20	Non-album single
"山河无恙在我胸" (with Tong Liya) (Note: COVID-19 Pandemic support song)	2020	6	Non-album single
"—" denotes releases that did not chart or were not released in that region.
