= Formed Police Unit =

Police units in peacekeeping operations

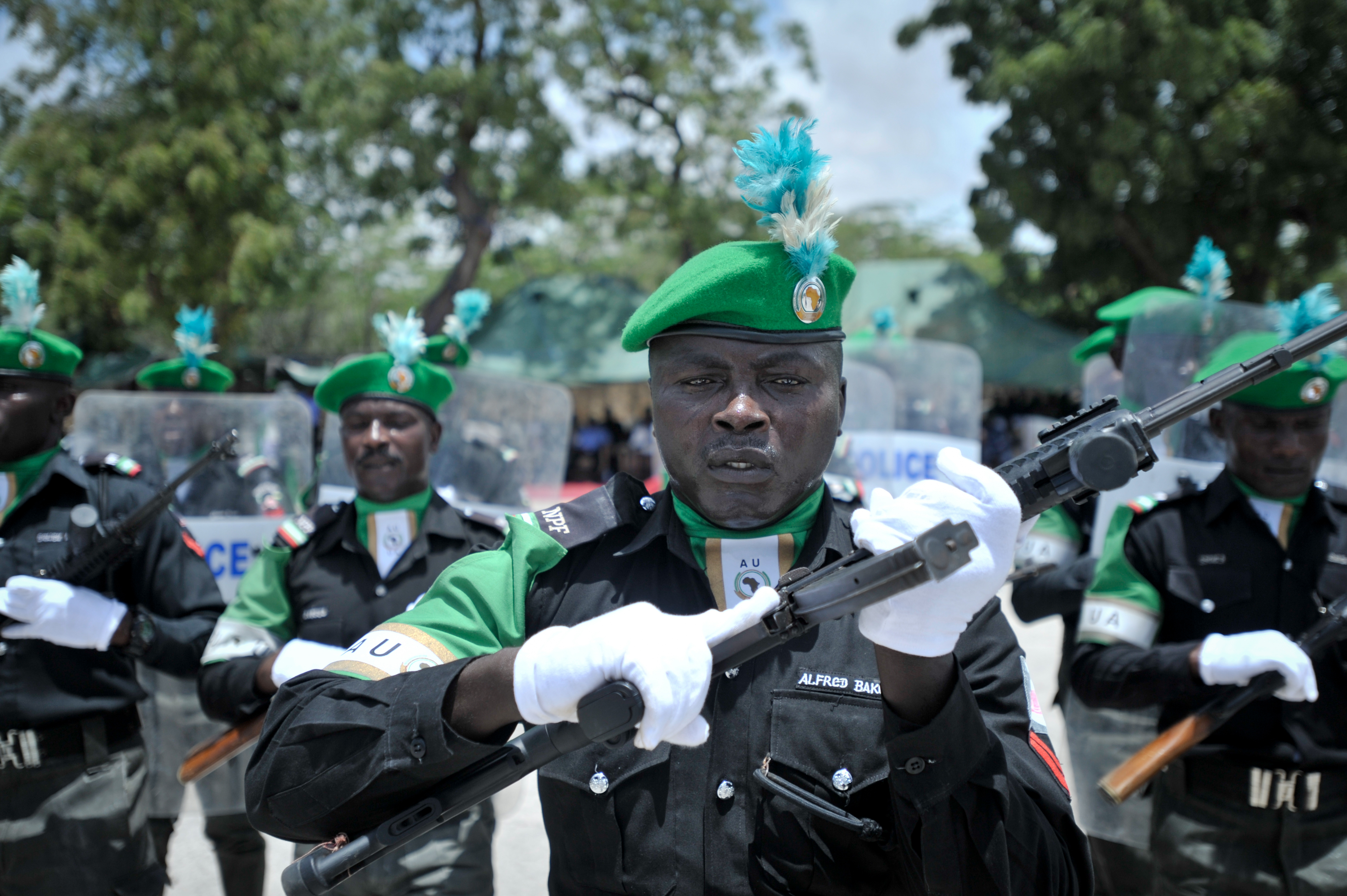
Nigerian personnel of an African Union FPU pictured in 2013.

A Formed Police Unit (FPU) is a law enforcement unit used by some international organizations, such as the United Nations (UN), European Union (EU), and African Union (AU), in support of peacekeeping operations. Each FPU is composed of personnel contributed by a member state and deployed under the organization's authority.

== History ==
Formed Police Units were first used in 1999 with the United Nations Mission in Kosovo and the United Nations Transitional Administration in East Timor.

In 2007, the first all-female FPU – contributed by India – was deployed as part of the United Nations Mission in Liberia. A second all-female FPU was contributed by Bangladesh to the UN mission in Haiti in 2010.

The African Union stood-up its first FPUs in 2012 in support of the African Union Mission in Somalia. Two 140-member FPUs were sent to Somalia that year, one each from Uganda and Nigeria.

As of 2016, there were 71 authorized UN Formed Police Units collectively composed of 10,000 personnel.

== Organization and operations ==
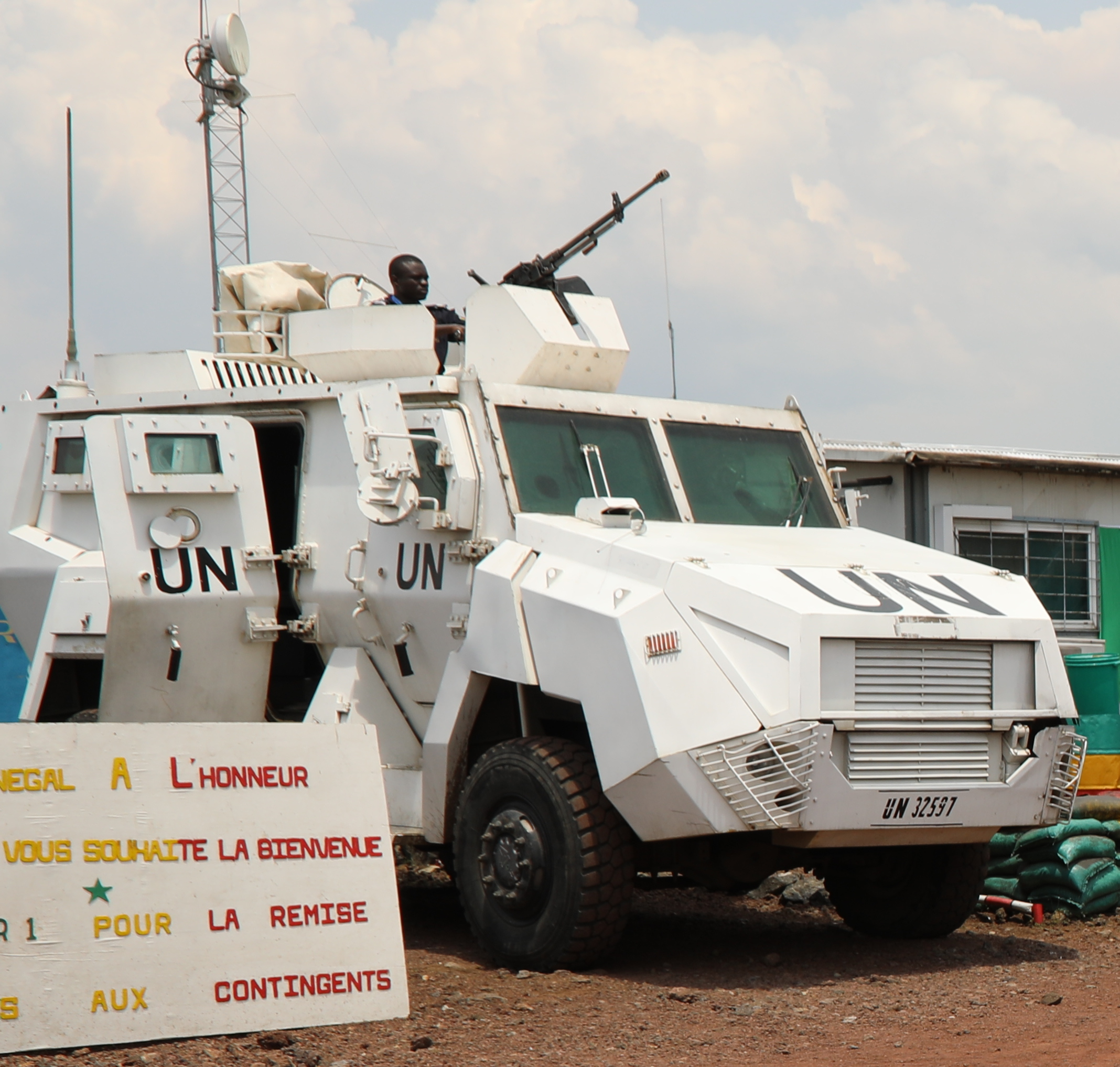
A Senegal Formed Police Unit armored vehicle is pictured in the Democratic Republic of Congo in 2019.

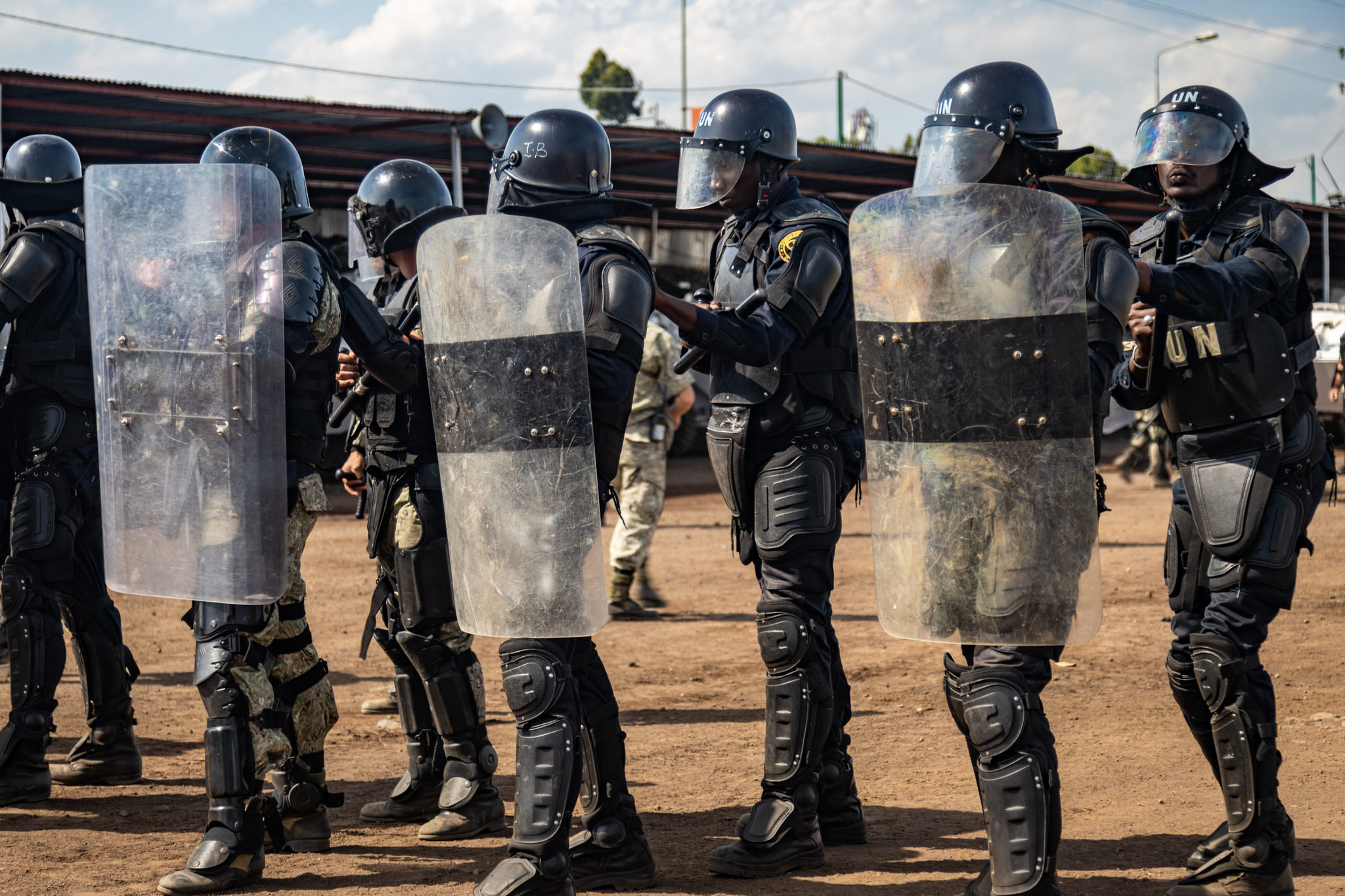
A Uruguayan FPU is trained on riot control tactics by Senegalese instructors in 2020.

=== Organization ===
A Formed Police Unit is a single-nation contingent composed of approximately 140 personnel. FPUs are typically used during a mission's start-up and surge phases to signal a stronger presence than would be possible with individual police officers. To maximize operational efficiency, single FPUs are composed of police from the contributing country only, instead of from multiple states.

=== Operations ===
Formed Police Units perform three functions: crowd and riot control, protection of the sponsor organization's facilities and personnel, and support to local police in situations that require additional resources but do not necessitate a military response. In the latter role, armed FPUs act as an intermediate response link between individual police officers who are unarmed and armed military units; according to Kamil Kuć and Walentyna Trzcińska they "work where a show of force is needed, but where the intervention of the army would be excessive". In the European Union Rule of Law Mission in Kosovo, for instance, the EU FPU is a second-tier response element in Kosovo's three-layer security operation; the first layer is the Kosovo Police and the third layer is the NATO Kosovo Force.

=== Training ===
Personnel in FPUs are trained police from their sponsoring country. In addition, prior to deployment, they receive supplementary training dictated by the deploying organization to ensure minimum competency and standardized operating protocols. In the case of UN FPUs, this is generally a 300-hour course covering topics such as defense against IEDs, evacuations, convoy escort procedures, physical security, first aid, and riot control tactics.

== In popular culture ==
The Chinese film Formed Police Unit, produced by Andrew Lau and directed by Tat-Chiu Lee, is a fictional account of a Chinese FPU on an overseas peacekeeping mission.

== See also ==
- United Nations Police
- History of United Nations peacekeeping
- Special Team Six
