= Formed Police Unit (film) =

2024 Chinese film

- Simplified Chinese: 维和防暴队
- Literal meaning: Peacekeeping Riot Squad
- Directed by: Tat Chiu Lee
- Written by: Li Hui, Wu Mengzhang, Carrie Ann
- Produced by: Andrew Lau; Liu Xuewu
- Starring: Huang Jingyu; Wang Yibo; Zhong Chuxi
- Cinematography: Yuen Man Fung
- Music by: Roc Chen
- Production company: Wanda Film
- Distributed by: Wanda Film; Shanghai Taopiaopiao Film
- Release date: May 1, 2024 (China)
- Running time: 101 minutes
- Country: China
- Language: Mandarin

Formed Police Unit is a 2024 Chinese action film based on real events of the Chinese Formed Police Unit when they were deployed on duty overseas. Directed by Hong Kong director Tat Chiu Lee, and produced by Andrew Lau, the film stars Huang Jingyu, Wang Yibo, and Zhong Chuxi.

== Plot ==
The film is the first commercial film with an overseas peacekeeping theme, focusing on the life and death moments of the Chinese peacekeeping police. The riot squad consists of officers Yu Weidong (played by Huang Jingyu), Yang Zhen (played by Wang Yibo), and Ding Hui (played by Zhong Chuxi) were sent on an overseas mission at the request of the United Nations. They shouldered a sacred mission and traveled to foreign countries to carry out peacekeeping tasks in war-torn mission areas. They will face various dangers such as terrorist attacks, armed riots, and rampant gangs, and peacekeeping operations cannot be delayed

== Cast ==
- Huang Jingyu as Yu Weidong
- Wang Yibo as Yang Zhen
- Zhong Chuxi as Ding Hui
- Gu Jiacheng as Jiang Xiaoyang
- Zhao Huahua as Du Yifan

== Production ==
The filming started in Beihai, Guangxi from February 27, 2021, until May 2021. On August 13 of the same year, the film's official Weibo posted an announcement, announcing the termination of all cooperation with Zhang Zhehan due to the actor being involved in a controversy over photos taken years earlier in Japan at a spot near the Yasukuni Shrine and Nogi Shrine due to the shrines' honoring of imperial Japanese military officers who invaded China. Due to this incident, it took three years for the film to replace, reshoot, and cut out scenes involving the actor.
