= Escape from the 21st Century =

- Theatrical release poster
- Chinese: 从21世纪安全撤离
- Hanyu Pinyin: Cóng 21 shìjì ānquán chèlí
- Directed by: Li Yang
- Written by: Li Yang
- Starring: Zhang Ruoyun; Zhong Chuxi; Song Yang; Wu Xiaoliang
- Cinematography: Saba Mazloum
- Edited by: Huang Shang
- Music by: Hu Xiaoou
- Production companies: Beijing Enlight Media; Huanxi Media; Desen International Media
- Distributed by: Beijing Enlight Media; Huaxia Film Distribution
- Release date: 2 August 2024
- Running time: 98 minutes
- Country: China
- Language: Mandarin
- Box office: $15.8 million

Escape from the 21st Century (Chinese: 从21世纪安全撤离) is a 2024 Chinese science fiction comedy film written and directed by Li Yang in his feature-length directional debut. It stars Zhang Ruoyun, Zhong Chuxi, Song Yang, and Wu Xiaoliang, with Zhu Yanmanzi, Leon Lee, and Wen Zhengrong in supporting roles. The film blends elements of ACG culture, cyberpunk, Chinese-style dreamcore, and time travel.

== Synopsis ==
The story is set on the fictional planet K, where three high school students, Wang Zha, Chengyong, and Paopao, accidentally gain the ability to travel back and forth 20 years into the future. However, the future turns out to be far less wonderful than they imagined, and this power draws them into a conspiracy in the future world.

After discovering that the future is unpredictable and that their present lives are full of hardship, they face a series of challenges and crises. Determined to change their fate, Wang Zha and his friends decide to become superheroes, joining forces to battle evil forces and save a world on the brink of destruction.

== Cast ==
- Zhang Ruoyun as Wang Zha
  - Chen Yichen as young Wang Zha
- Zhong Chuxi as Liu Lianzhi
- Song Yang as Wang Chengyong
  - Li Zhuozhao as young Wang Chengyong
- Wu Xiaoliang as Han Guang
- Zhu Yanmanzi as Yang Yi
  - Ma Fantin as young Yang Yi
- Leon Lee as Bubble (Paopao)
- Wen Zhengrong as the Third Master
- Shi Liang as Wang Chengyong's father
- Kang Qixuan as Junior Bubble

== Release ==
The film was originally scheduled to be released in China on August 3, 2024, but on July 26 it was announced that the release would be moved up to August 2. Preview screenings began in select cities on July 18, with nationwide limited previews across China on July 27 and 28.

Fortissimo Films acquired the film's international distribution rights. The film was selected for the "Midnight Madness" section of the 2024 Toronto International Film Festival and had its international premiere during the festival.

== Reception ==
Cath Clarke of The Guardian gave the film 3 out of 5 stars, describing it as a "barmy" coming-of-age science fiction film in which teenagers accidentally travel 20 years into the future. She noted the film's energetic direction and maximalist style.
