= Nie Xiaoqian =

Chinese literary fictional character

- Short story by Pu Songling
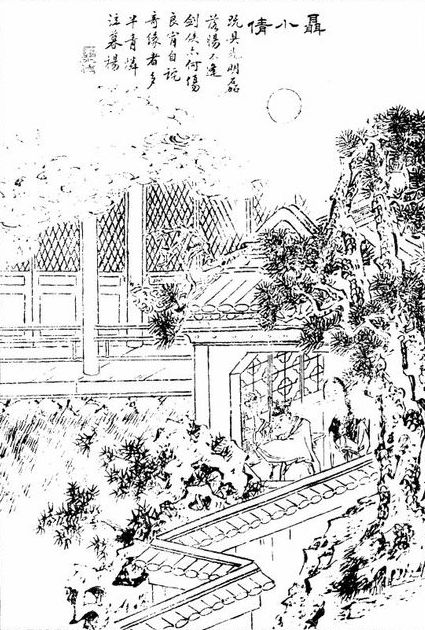
- 19th-century illustration from Xiangzhu liaozhai zhiyi tuyong (Liaozhai with commentary and illustrations; 1886)
- Original title: 聶小倩 (Niè Xiǎoqiàn)
- Translator: Sidney L. Sondergard
- Country: China
- Language: Chinese
- Genre: Zhiguai

Publication
- Published in: Strange Stories from a Chinese Studio
- Publication type: Anthology
- Publication date: c. 1740
- Published in English: 2008

Chronology
Yingning (嬰寧)	The Sea Prince (海公子)

Nie Xiaoqian
- Traditional Chinese: 聶小倩
- Simplified Chinese: 聂小倩
Transcriptions
Standard Mandarin
- Hanyu Pinyin: Niè Xiǎoqiàn
- Wade–Giles: Nieh Hsiao-ch'ien
Yue: Cantonese
- Jyutping: Nip6 Siu2 Sin6

Nie Xiaoqian (Chinese: 聶小倩; pinyin: Niè Xiǎoqiàn) is a fantasy story in Pu Songling's short story collection Strange Stories from a Chinese Studio, and the name of its female lead character. Pu describes her appearance as "gorgeous; girl in paintings" (traditional Chinese: 艷絕；畫中人; simplified Chinese: 艳绝；画中人). The story has been adapted into numerous films and television dramas. The name is commonly rendered as Nip Siu Sin in Hong Kong adaptations in accordance with its Cantonese pronunciation.

== Plot ==
Nie Xiaoqian is introduced as a beautiful female ghost. She died at the age of 18 and was interred in an old temple in Jinhua, Zhejiang. Nie is coerced to participate in ritual murders in the service of a demon. A pale-faced scholar, Ning Caichen, is going to Beijing to take a civil service examination. Though Nie attempts to prey upon Ning Caichen, he resists her and takes her from the demon. As Ning's sickly wife slowly dies, Nie fulfills expectations of filial piety as she takes upon the household chores. Once Ning's wife dies, he is free to pursue Nie. Nie's good works earn her humanity back. She and Ning marry and conceive a child, representative of Nie's restoration.

== Characters ==
=== Nie Xiaoqian ===
Nie Xiaoqian appears in Strange Tales from a Chinese Studio as a ghost whose beauty is matched by talent and innate kindness. Once an eighteen-year-old girl, she died young and was buried beside a derelict temple just north of Jinhua, Zhejiang. In the afterlife, she fell under the sway of a Yaksha and other Yaoguais, who compelled her to lure passing travellers to their doom. On one such mission, she tried to ensnare the scholar Ning Caichen, who sought accommodation at Lanruo Temple, but his integrity and compassion moved her to lend him her aid instead. Then, with Ning's help, she later escaped her demonic captors and found refuge in the Ning household, caring for his mother and his ailing wife. After the wife's death, she married Ning Caichen, and together the couple destroyed the yaoguais that had long haunted Jinhua. Some years later they had a son, and the story ends on a note of domestic harmony.

=== Ning Caichen ===
Ning Caichen (Chinese: 宁采臣) is the male protagonist of Nie Xiaoqian, a tale within Pu Songling's Qing dynasty collection Strange Tales from a Chinese Studio (Chinese: 《聊斋志异》). A native of Zhejiang, he is depicted as generous, forthright and scrupulously upright, immune to the lure of beauty. Owing to financial hardship, Ning Caichen lodged for a time at Lanruo Temple, where he encountered Nie Xiaoqian, then under the control of a Yaksha. Naturally compassionate and unwilling to harm the living, Xiaoqian helped him evade the Yaoguais in pursuit of him and, with the swordsman Yan Chixia's assistance, he survived the ordeal. Later, Ning offered Xiaoqian refuge in his household, entrusting her with the care of his mother and his gravely ill wife. After the wife's death, he married Xiaoqian; upon her advice, he employed a magic sword-pouch to slay Laolao, the yaksha. Years afterwards, Ning passed the imperial examination and attained the degree of Jinshi (the top degree in China's ancient imperial examinations, leading to official positions). Xiaoqian bore him a son and, after he took a concubine, each woman bore another. The household remained harmonious, and all three sons matured into men of distinction.

=== Yan Chixia ===
In Nie Xiaoqian, Yan Chixia lodges for a time in a derelict temple outside Jinhua. During his stay, he wounds the Yaksha with a luminous blade concealed in a sword-pouch, displaying preternatural swordsmanship. Later, he gives the pouch to the scholar Ning Caichen as a talisman against Yaoguais. In the original work, Yan Chixia is portrayed as calm, taciturn and decisive. Dressed in a scholar's robe, he is hinted to hail from the land of Qin—roughly today's Shaanxi—and combines the polish of a literatus with the vigour of a fighting man. His character blends elements of the traditional swordsman, the folk wonder-worker and the religious adept. In contemporary screen adaptations, Yan Chixia's image has changed markedly, shifting from a provincial scholar to a wandering master versed in both Buddhist and Daoist arts who roams the martial world as a lone slayer of yaoguais.

=== Laolao ===
Laolao is hidden within the crumbling Lanruo Temple. A consummate deceiver, she adopts the guise of an aged crone yet wields formidable magic and retains the savage nature of a Yaksha. Laolao instructs Nie Xiaoqian to entice the scholar Ning Caichen, but the scheme fails when Ning sees through the ruse and stands firm. Laolao then attacks him herself, yet is wounded by the Taoist Yan Chixia's magic vessel and manages to escape only after crashing accidentally into a lattice window. Ning Caichen later takes Nie Xiaoqian's ashes back to her native soil for re-burial, provoking Laolao's wrath. She pursues him to the Ning household, intent on revenge. In the climactic encounter, Laolao reveals her yaksha form and launches an assault, but the magic pouch that Yan Chixia had planted earlier activates: the moment she touches it, she is sucked inside, sealed, and destroyed.

== Setting ==
The principal setting of the story is Lanruo Temple; the text situates it in open country north of the prefectural seat of Jinhua.

The term "Lanruo" comes from the Sanskrit "aranya", which first meant "quiet forest" and later came to denote a Buddhist monastery.In several stories within Strange Tales, Pu uses "lanruo" in this generic sense. In the original text, therefore, "Lanruo Temple" signifies simply "a secluded temple", not a unique proper name.

== Film and television ==
Year	Title	Chinese Title	Actress	References
1960	The Enchanting Shadow	《倩女幽魂》	Betty Loh Ti	
1975	Chinese Folklore: Nie Xiaoqian	《民間傳奇之聶小倩》	Wen Lau-mei	
1975	Blue Lamp in a Winter Night	《寒夜青燈》	Qin Meng	
1981	Nie Xiaoqian	《聂小倩》	Geng Xiaolu	
1982	Nie Xiaoqian	《聂小倩》	Chen Xiaoxu	
1984	The Nocturnal Legends	《聊齋夜話之聶小倩》	Zhuang Jing'er	
1987	A Chinese Ghost Story	《倩女幽魂》	Joey Wong	
1991		《古墓荒斋》	Hu Tian'ge	
1994	Spirit in an Old Temple	《古庙倩魂》	Hui Juanyan	
1995	Ghost Catcher - Legend of Beauty	《天師鍾馗之倩女情仇》	Yu Xiaofan	
1997	A Chinese Ghost Story: The Tsui Hark Animation	《小倩》	Anita Yuen / Sylvia Chang	
1999	People Love Ghost	《人鬼情缘》	Liu Mintao	
2003	Eternity: A Chinese Ghost Story	《倩女幽魂》	Barbie Hsu	
2004	The Qian Nü lost souls: Catch tianshi	《倩女失魂》	Wang Qian	
2005	Strange Stories from a Chinese Studio	《新聊斋志异》	Yang Mi	
2008	Love Stories in Ancient China	《中国古代爱情故事新编之小倩》	Jiang Yan	
2010	Ghost Catcher - Legend of Beauty	《天师钟馗之血色鸳鸯》	Jenny Zhang	
2011	A Chinese Ghost Story	《倩女幽魂》	Liu Yifei	
2012	Hu Xian	《狐仙》	Choo Ja-hyun	
2019	The Knight of Shadows: Between Yin and Yang	《神探蒲松龄之兰若仙踪》	Zhong Chuxi	
2020	The Enchanting Phantom a.k.a. A Chinese Ghost Story - Human Love	《倩女幽魂：人间情》	Eleanor Lee	
