= United Nations Police =

Part of UN peace operations

- Map of UN member states.^{a}
- Headquarters: International territory Manhattan; New York City
- Official languages: 6 languages: Arabic; Chinese; English; French; Russian; Spanish
- Membership: 193 member states

Leaders
  - Secretary-General: (Portugal) António Guterres
  - Under-Secretary-General: (France) Jean-Pierre Lacroix
  - United Nations Police Adviser: (Pakistan) Faisal Shahkar

Establishment
  - UN Charter signed: 26 June 1945
  - Charter in force: 24 October 1945
- Website
- 1. Note that this map does not represent the view of its members or the UN concerning the legal status of any country, nor does it accurately reflect which areas' governments have UN representation.

The United Nations Police (UNPOL) is an integral part of the United Nations peace operations. Currently, about 11,530 UN Police officers from over 90 countries are deployed in 11 UN peacekeeping operations and 6 Special Political Missions. The "mission of the UN Police is to enhance international peace and security by supporting Member States in conflict, post-conflict and other crisis situations to realise effective, efficient, representative, responsive and accountable police services that serve and protect the population".

== Summary ==
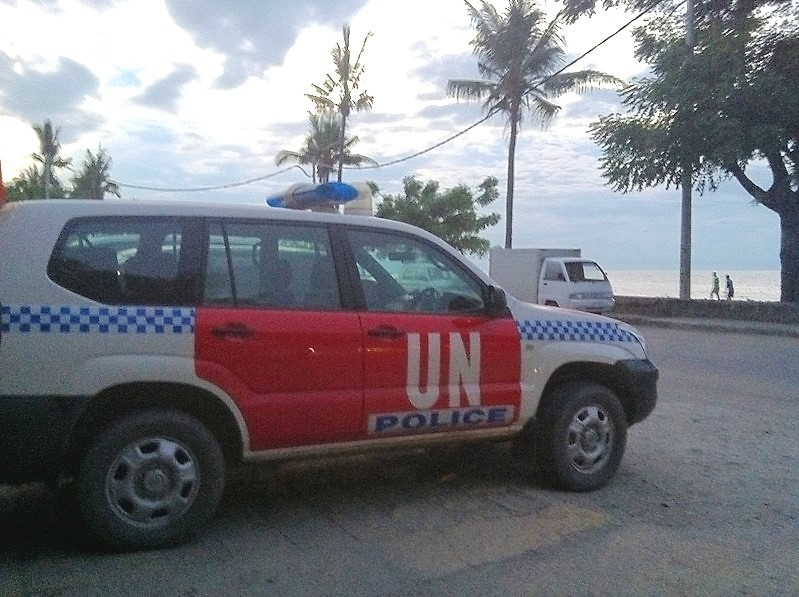
UN Police car in Dili, East Timor

Since the 1960s, the United Nations Member States have contributed police officers to United Nations Peacekeeping operations. The policing tasks of these operations were originally limited to monitoring, observing and reporting, but by the early 1990s, advising, mentoring and training of these personnel were adopted into the activities of the peace operations. The UN Police, authorised by the United Nations Security Council according to the rule of law and international human rights, are to maintain public order, protect life and property as a full or partial substitute for the host nation's police force as observers only.

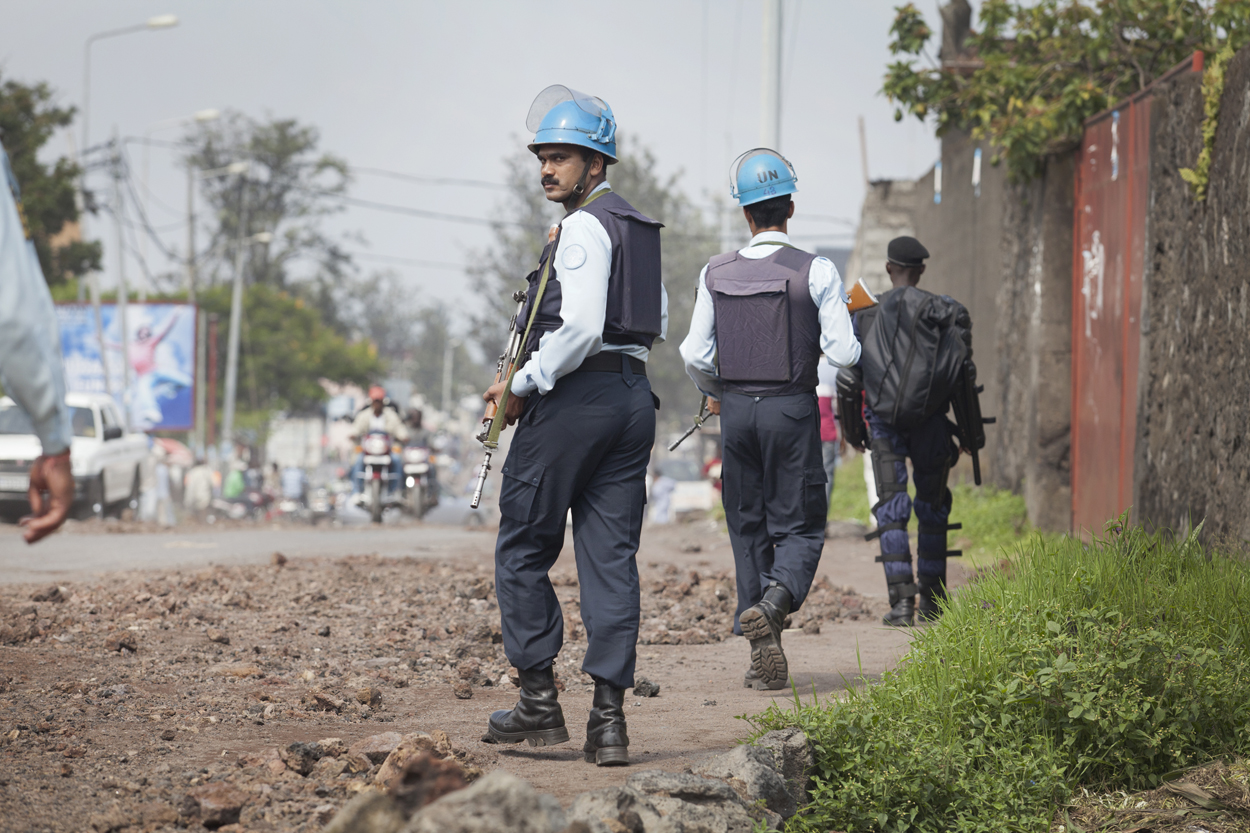
Indian policemen of the MONUSCO Formed Police Unit and the Congolese National Police patrol the streets of Goma, Nord Kivu province, Democratic Republic of Congo, 7 December 2011

The UN police consist of Formed Police Units (FPU), individual police officers (IPO), specialised teams and civilian experts, to pursue community-oriented and intelligence-led policing. They aim to protect civilians and their human rights. As part of this they focus on sexual and gender based violence, organised crime, and electoral security, amongst others.

United Nations police provide comprehensive and cohesive protective and mentoring services in 18 peace keeping missions globally from Haiti in Central America (MINUSTAH), to African nations of, Western Sahara (MINURSO), Mali (MINUSMA), Darfur (UNAMID), Liberia (UNMIL), Côte d'Ivoire (UNOCI), Central African Republic (MINUSCA), Democratic Republic of Congo (MONUSCO), Abyei (UNISFA), South Sudan (UNMISS), Libya (UNSMIL), Guinea -Bissau (UNIOGBIS), in Asia Afghanistan (UNAMA) Iraq (UNAMI), Lebanon (UNIFIL) and in Europe Kosovo (UNMIK) and Cyprus (UNFICYP).

In Kosovo and East Timor, UN Police were given an executive mandate to safeguard law and order while facilitating the launch of a new domestic police service. The UN Police mission in Kosovo helped to establish the Kosovo Police Service successfully. In Timor-Leste, the UN Police returned to their more traditional role of advising and supervising operations leaving districts of the country to the authority of the National Police. Since the 1990s, the number of United Nations Police officers in action has significantly increased from 5,233 in March 1993 to 14,703 deployed in March 2011. It has reduced in 2017 to 11,963 (March 2017).

The UN Police can be deployed alongside military personnel or independently. Through the Global Focal Point for Police, Justice and Corrections, United Nations Police officers from the United Nations Police Division Standing Police Capacity also assist UN country teams, guided by the UN Resident Coordinator.

== Duties ==
The duties and roles of the UN Police (UNPOL) component in a Peacekeeping Operation or in a Special Political Mission may vary, depending on each mission's reality.

The host-State policing institutions are, often, primarily responsible for the link between the government and security issues. Therefore, UNPOL play an important role in building the capacity of the host government policing institutions and other law enforcement agencies, specially in conflict and post conflict situations, including technical assistance, co-location, training and mentoring programs, where mandated.

Essentially, there are three different categories to work in United Nations Police Component:

1) As an Individual Police Officer (IPO): An IPO is temporary seconded, individually, to work within United Nations and share their knowledge with the host-State policing institutions. United Nations efforts are to bring high specialized officers to mission areas. Some of the requirements to work as an Individual Police Officer, for instance, are to be at least 25 years old, maximum 62, with a minimum police-related working experience of 5 years.

2) As part of a Formed Police Unit (FPU) component: FPU roles includes crowd control and protection of UN assets. The whole component is assessed as a unit before being deployed to a peacekeeping operation.

3) As a professional and higher categories staff: This kind of appointment may allow you to initiate a career in United Nations, and often a master's degree or higher education is required. The salaries are higher and this include special functions in a mission like Chiefs and Senior Police Advisers.

UNPOL may also be responsible for:

- Policy and guidance development: Creating policy and guidance and defining the parameters of international police peacekeeping.
- Strategic planning: Strengthening the Police Division's resources and ability to conduct strategic planning.
- Selection and recruitment processes: Improving efforts to recruit, select, deploy and rotate highly qualified staff in missions. Increasing the number of female officers in the UN Police service.
- Operational support to missions through the Standing Police Capacity: Increasing the effectiveness of the operational support provided by the Standing Police Capacity.
- Response to Sexual and Gender-based Violence (SGBV): Strengthening its response to sexual and gender-based violence and creating guidance to assist its police officers.
- Global Lead, partnerships and regional cooperation: leading the area of international policing and developing partnerships for more effective delivery of its mandates.

== Current operations ==
=== Guinea ===
The United Nations Office for the High Commissioner for Human Rights (OCHR) expressed its deep concern over excessive use of force by Guinea’s security forces against demonstrators ahead of long-delayed presidential run-off polls. One man was killed and more than 60 others injured when Government forces used live fire in their effort to quell demonstrations in the capital, Conakry.

The Office said that while it appreciated that authorities had a difficult task in dealing with the demonstrations, which in some cases degenerated into violence, including stone throwing. But it said that it believes Government forces committed serious rights violations by indiscriminately shooting at unarmed civilians, sometimes at point-blank range; breaking into and ransacking private homes; and severely beating young men who put up no resistance. Some of the security forces’ operations appeared to target entire areas indiscriminately and little effort was made to distinguish between violent protestors and those who had taken no part in the demonstrations, OHCHR said. It has also been confirmed that an unknown number of people were arbitrarily denied lawyers, also breaking the law.

=== Afghanistan ===
Secretary-General Ban Ki-moon and the Security Council have begun strongly condemning the suicide attack on the United Nations compound in Afghanistan's western city of Herat, where members of staff of the UN mission in the country and other agencies are based. There were no casualties among the UN staff, but some security guards were wounded, the spokesperson of the Secretary-General said in a statement. A number of assailants were killed in the attack, and the UN is conducting a full investigation. In addition, the UN Assistance Mission in Afghanistan (UNAMA) also condemned the attack and stressed that the Organisation was in the country to support efforts to restore peace and provide humanitarian and development assistance to the people. The attack did not disrupt UN activities in Herat, however.

=== Sudan ===
The United Nations stands ready to assist the upcoming referendum that will decide whether southern Sudan declares independence from Africa's largest country, an official with the world body said today, with voter registration set to kick off in two weeks. During voting day, more than 3,000 registration kits for distribution in southern Sudan and 840 kits for the north, along with registration books and cards, were handed over to the SSRC and its bureau in Juba, the southern capital.

== Timeline ==
- 1960: the 2nd police officers are used in the UN Operation in Congo (ONUC)
- 1964: marks the first time the formal police component is used in the UN Peacekeeping force in Cyprus
- 1989: saw the increased use of the UN Police because of the end of the Cold War.

- Police are used in peacekeeping operations in Namibia, El Salvador, and Mozambique

- 1995: The UN Police is instrumental in the UN mission in Bosnia and Herzegovina.

- Recognised as a central tool for helping countries recover from conflict

- 1999: UN Police are deployed to Kosovo
- 2000: 5840 UN Police are on peacekeeping missions
- 2006: The standing capacity is established
- 2007: A half women FPU is sent from India to Liberia

- Officers are also sent to Darfur

== Functions ==
Some of the functions of the UN Police include:

- Interim law enforcement

Responsible for policing and all law enforcement. Some examples are the operations in Kosovo and Timor-Leste

- Formed police units

These are used for crowd control and quelling riots

- Protecting UN personnel

- They also work in tandem with local law enforcement

== See also ==
- Interpol
- United Nations
- Department of Peacekeeping Operations
- Department of Political Affairs
- Formed Police Unit
