= Zhong Chuxi =

Chinese actress (born 1993)

- 钟楚曦
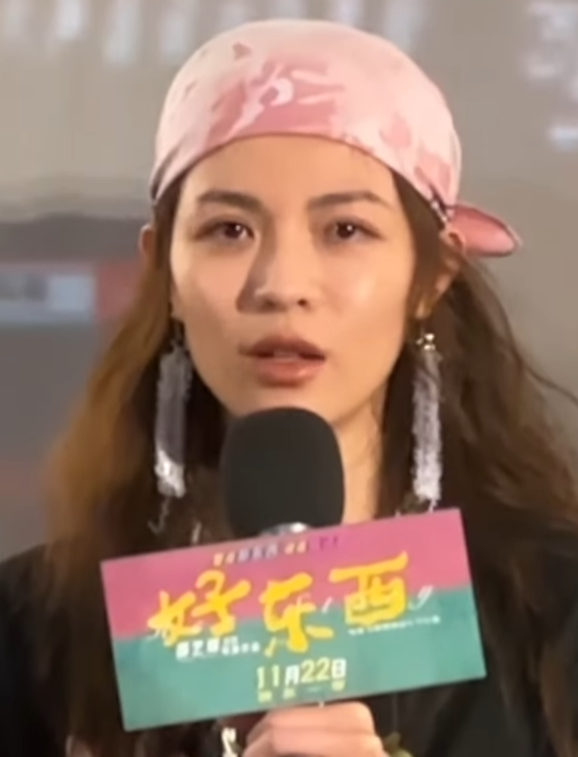
- Zhong in 2024
- Born: 18 March 1993 (age 33); Guangzhou, Guangdong, China
- Other name: Elaine Zhong
- Education: Shanghai Theatre Academy
- Occupation: Actress
- Years active: 2013–present
- Agent: Huayi Brothers

Chinese name
- Traditional Chinese: 鍾楚曦
- Simplified Chinese: 钟楚曦
Transcriptions
Standard Mandarin
- Hanyu Pinyin: Zhōng Chǔxī
Yue: Cantonese
- Jyutping: Zung1 Co2 Hei1

Zhong Chuxi (Chinese: 钟楚曦; pinyin: Zhōng Chǔxī; born 18 March 1993), also known as Elane Zhong or Elaine Zhong, is a Chinese actress best known for portraying Nie Xiaoqian in the 2019 film The Knight of Shadows: Between Yin and Yang.

== Early life ==
Zhong Chuxi was born on 18 March 1993 in Guangzhou, Guangdong. Her father, a graduate in computer science from Sun Yat-sen University, worked in information technology, and her mother was a television presenter. Encouraged by her mother, she began learning dance at the age of three. In 2003, she entered the Guangdong Dance School, where she studied Chinese dance for six years, and in 2010, she was admitted to the folk dance programme of the Shanghai Theatre Academy.

== Career ==
=== 2013–2016: Early roles ===
Zhong made her screen debut in the medical drama Love of Obstetrics and Gynecology (爱的妇产科), playing the nurse Yang Chenxi. In 2015, she was cast as Dai Yushi in the period spy drama Gone with the Red Dust (怒海红尘), and on 1 October that year, she signed with Huayi Brothers. In 2016, she was cast as Cen Huihui, a Cantonese opera performer and the first love of Huang Feihong, opposite Zheng Kai in the drama Huang Fei Hong (国士无双黄飞鸿).

=== 2017–2021: Youth and film roles ===
In 2017, Zhong played Xiao Suizi, one of the leading roles, opposite Huang Xuan in Feng Xiaogang's film Youth. The role earned her a nomination for Best New Performer at the 54th Golden Horse Awards and the Asian New Talent Award at the 2nd Asian Brilliant Stars awards in 2018. She then appeared in the campus comedy Dude's Manual (脱单告急), with Jackie Chan in the fantasy film The Knight of Shadows: Between Yin and Yang, and with Zheng Kai in the television drama Long Time No See (好久不见), as Ye Cong. In 2019, she played Mei Yan in the war film Liberation (解放·终局营救).

In Wild Grass (荞麦疯长), released on 25 August 2020, Zhong played Li Mai, a dancer, alongside Ma Sichun and Huang Jingyu. For the role, she won the Golden Crane Award for Best Actress at the China Film Week of the 33rd Tokyo International Film Festival in November 2020. The following month, she won the Golden Lotus Award for Best Actress at the 12th Macau International Movie Festival for Endless Summer (八月未央), a film adapted from a novel by Annie Baobei, in which she starred with Luo Jin and Tan Songyun. In 2021, she starred with Hu Yitian in the drama Youth Should Be Early (青春须早为), about young entrepreneurs, appeared in the historical film 1921 and played a signals soldier, Jiang Nanzheng, in the military drama Ace Troops (王牌部队), which began airing on 26 December 2021.

=== 2022–present ===
In 2022, Zhong starred with Xu Kai in the drama Lost in the Kunlun Mountains (迷航昆仑墟). In 2023, she made a special appearance as a police officer, Yan Ming, in the drama Imperfect Victim, and she starred in the dramas The Furthest Distance (最遥远的距离) and, opposite Gong Jun, Rising With the Wind (我要逆风去), as the heir to a century-old Chinese brand.

In 2024, Zhong played a dance teacher who is disfigured and undergoes an amputation after a car accident in the family drama Born to Run (如果奔跑是我的人生), and Empress Wu in the mystery drama Judge Dee's Mystery (大唐狄公案). She starred in the dramas What If (生活在别处的我) and Begin Again (灿烂的风和海), which began airing in December 2024. Her films that year included the action film Formed Police Unit, Escape from the 21st Century, with Zhang Ruoyun, and Shao Yihui's comedy Her Story, in which she played Xiao Ye. For Her Story, she won the Golden Rooster Award for Best Supporting Actress at the 38th Golden Rooster Awards on 15 November 2025, and the award for best supporting actress at the 1st Singapore International Chinese Film Golden Lion Awards in December 2025.

In 2025, Zhong performed at the CCTV Spring Festival Gala and starred with Qin Hao and Han Geng in Lu Chuan's drama A Life for a Life (借命而生). In August 2026, she starred with Francis Ng and Zheng Yunlong in the psychological suspense drama Cicada (蝉).

== Filmography ==
=== Film ===
| Year | English title | Chinese title | Role | Ref. |
|---|---|---|---|---|
| 2017 | Youth | 芳华 | Xiao Suizi | |
| 2018 | Dude's Manual | 脱单告急 | Guan Xin | |
| 2019 | The Knight of Shadows: Between Yin and Yang | 神探蒲松龄之兰若仙踪 | Nie Xiaoqian | |
| 2019 | Liberation | 解放·终局营救 | Mei Yan | |
| 2019 | Adoring | 宠爱 | Fang Xin | |
| 2020 | Wild Grass | 荞麦疯长 | Li Mai | |
| 2021 | 1921 | 1921 | Li Lizhuang | |
| 2021 | Endless Summer | 八月未央 | Weiyang | |
| 2024 | Formed Police Unit | 维和防暴队 | Ding Hui | |
| 2024 | Escape from the 21st Century | 从21世纪安全撤离 | Liu Lianzhi | |
| 2024 | Her Story | 好东西 | Xiao Ye | |
| TBA | Reset: The Undeliverable Parcel | 开端之送不到的快递 | Qin Rourou | |

=== Television series ===
| Year | English title | Chinese title | Role | Notes | Ref. |
|---|---|---|---|---|---|
| 2014 | Love of Obstetrics and Gynecology | 爱的妇产科 | Yang Chenxi | Seasons 1–2 | |
| 2014 | Love is Back | 爱情回来了 | Du Jiajia | | |
| 2015 | Orange Code | 橙色密码 | Li Menglan | | |
| 2016 | A Detective Housewife | 煮妇神探 | Zhang Su | | |
| 2017 | Night Market Life | 夜市人生 | Liu Lili | | |
| 2017 | Gone with the Red Dust | 怒海红尘 | Dai Yushi | | |
| 2017 | Huang Fei Hong | 国士无双黄飞鸿 | Cen Huihui | | |
| 2018 | Long Time No See | 好久不见 | Ye Cong | | |
| 2021 | Youth Should Be Early | 青春须早为 | Cheng Xin | | |
| 2021 | Ace Troops | 王牌部队 | Jiang Nanzheng | | |
| 2022 | Lost in the Kunlun Mountains | 迷航昆仑墟 | Wu Shuang | | |
| 2023 | Imperfect Victim | 不完美受害人 | Yan Ming | Special appearance | |
| 2023 | The Furthest Distance | 最遥远的距离 | Su Ying | | |
| 2023 | Rising With the Wind | 我要逆风去 | Jiang Hu | | |
| 2024 | Born to Run | 如果奔跑是我的人生 | Cheng Anxin | | |
| 2024 | Judge Dee's Mystery | 大唐狄公案 | Empress Wu | | |
| 2024 | What If | 生活在别处的我 | Xia Guo | | |
| 2024 | Begin Again | 灿烂的风和海 | Chen Jiahui (Josephine Chen) | | |
| 2025 | A Life for a Life | 借命而生 | Liu Fenfang | | |
| 2026 | Cicada | 蝉 | Ding Ning | | |
| TBA | Us in Wonderland | 明日乐园 | Lin Sanjiu | Filming completed in February 2026 | |
| TBA | Love Kills Slowly | 爱情慢慢 | Zhu Lizhi | Filming completed in June 2026 | |

== Discography ==
| Year | English title | Chinese title | Album | Ref. |
|---|---|---|---|---|
| 2019 | "My Motherland and I" | 我和我的祖国 | Qing Chun Wei Zu Guo Er Chang | |
| 2019 | "Adoring" | 宠爱 | Adoring OST | |
| 2020 | "Colorful Days" | | Wild Grass OST | |

== Awards and nominations ==
| Year | Award | Category | Nominated work | Result | Ref. |
|---|---|---|---|---|---|
| 2017 | 54th Golden Horse Film Festival and Awards | Best New Performer | Youth | Nominated | |
| 2017 | 1st Marianas International Film Festival | Best New Artist | Youth | Won | |
| 2018 | 12th Asian Film Awards | Best Newcomer | Youth | Nominated | |
| 2018 | 9th China Film Director's Guild Awards | Best Actress | Youth | Nominated | |
| 2018 | 23rd Huading Awards | Best Newcomer | Youth | Won | |
| 2018 | 25th Beijing College Student Film Festival | Best Newcomer | Youth | Won | |
| 2019 | Cosmo Glam Night | Person of The Year (Love) | —N/a | Won | |
| 2019 | 16th Esquire Man At His Best Awards | Quality Artist of the Year | —N/a | Won | |
| 2020 | 8th Vancouver Chinese Film Festival | Most Popular Actress | Adoring | Won | |
| 2020 | 12th Macau International Movie Festival | Best Actress | Endless Summer | Won | |
| 2025 | 38th Golden Rooster Awards | Best Supporting Actress | Her Story | Won | |
