= The Knight of Shadows: Between Yin and Yang =

2019 Chinese film by Yan Jia

- Film poster
- Traditional Chinese: 神探蒲松齡之蘭若仙蹤
- Simplified Chinese: 神探蒲松龄之兰若仙踪
- Hanyu Pinyin: Shéntàn Pú Sōnglíng Zhī Lánruò Xiānzōng
- Directed by: Vash
- Written by: Liu Bohan; Jian Wen
- Produced by: Shan Yong; A'gan
- Starring: Jackie Chan; Zhong Chuxi; Ethan Juan; Lin Peng; Austin Lin
- Cinematography: Choi Yeong-hwan
- Edited by: Wong Hoi
- Music by: Zhai Jinyan; Zhao Zhao
- Production companies: iQiyi; Beijing Yaolai Film and Television Culture Media Co., Ltd. Golden Shore Films & Television; Hengda Film and Television Culture Co., Ltd.
- Distributed by: iQiyi; Beijing Yaolai Film and Television Culture Media Co., Ltd. Golden Shore Films & Television
- Release date: 5 February 2019 (China)
- Running time: 108 minutes
- Country: China
- Language: Mandarin
- Box office: $22,774,256

The Knight of Shadows: Between Yin and Yang (Chinese: 神探蒲松龄之兰若仙踪) is a 2019 Chinese historical fantasy comedy film directed by Yan Jia (under the pseudonym Vash), written by Liu Bohan and Jian Wen, and starring Jackie Chan, Zhong Chuxi, Ethan Juan, Lin Peng, and Austin Lin. The film was released on 5 February 2019 in China.

== Cast ==
- Jackie Chan as Pu Songling
- Zhong Chuxi as Nie Xiaoqian
- Ethan Juan as Ning Caichen/Yan Chixia
- Lin Peng as Nie Xiaoqian's sister (Mirror Demon)
- Austin Lin as Yan Fei
- Qiao Shan
- Pan Changjiang
- Kingdom Yuen
- Lance Luu
- Jiang Yuan
- Jia Haitao

== Marketing ==
A music video for The Knight of Shadows was released on January 27, 2019.

== Release ==
The film was released on 5 February 2019 in China. In the Philippines, the film was released on 6 February 2019 by Star Cinema, timed to coincide with the Lunar New Year, with its premiere held at TriNoma four days prior.

== Reception ==
Douban gave the drama 4.3 out of 10.

=== Box office ===
The film earned a total of 123 million yuan in its first 5 days of release.
