= Gank Your Heart =

Chinese 2019 streaming TV series

- Drama Poster
- Also known as: 陪你到世界之巅
- Genre: Romance; Esports
- Based on: Dian Jing Lian Ren by Nanye Lin'er
- Written by: Zhang Chanjuan
- Directed by: Sha Weiqi
- Starring: Wang Yibo; Wang Zixuan
- Opening theme: "Burning Adventure" by Wang Yibo
- Ending theme: "Beyond the Sky" by Zhang Xianzi
- Composer: Zhu Jintai
- Country of origin: China
- Original language: Mandarin
- No. of episodes: 35 + 1 special

Production
- Executive producers: Tang Fan; Zhou Dan
- Production locations: Hangzhou; Shanghai
- Cinematography: Su Xinchao
- Production companies: Mango TV; Grand Media

Original release
- Network: Mango TV
- Release: June 29, 2019

Gank Your Heart is a 2019 Chinese streaming television series starring Wang Yibo and Wang Zixuan. The series is based on the novel Dian Jing Lian Ren by Nanye Lin'er. The drama began airing on Mango TV on June 9, 2019. In video gang terminology, gank means to something or to ambush and kill.

== Synopsis ==
A drama, the series follows the romance between Ji Xiangkong (Wang Yibo), a misunderstood professional gamer, as he pursues his dream of winning the championship, and Qiu Ying (Wang Zixuan), a live streamer whose ambition is to become a professional commentator.

== Cast ==
- Wang Yibo as Ji Xiangkong
- Wang Zixuan as Qiu Ying
- Yan Yuhao as Pei Xi
- Ding Guansen as Lin Yixuan
- Lu Xiaoyu as Lu Yiyi
- Lu Yangyang as Fu Miya
- Yan Xujia as Xia Ling
- Cheng Qimeng as Sun Zeyi
- Hu Yunhao as Luo Tian
- Gao Taiyu as Gu Fang
- Wang Ziyun as Shu Wen
- Zhang Xiaoqian as Summer
- Chai Haowei as Li Gan
- Huang Xinyao as Qiao Xin
- Gu Zhaoen as Qi Yue
- Li Xiaofeng as Li Xiaofeng (himself, guest star in episode 32)

== Award and nominations ==
Year	Award	Category	Nominee	Result	ref.
2019	Golden Tower Award	Most Popular Actor	Wang Yibo	Nominated	
2019	Golden Bud - The Fourth Network Film And Television Festival	Best Actor	Wang Yibo	Nominated	
2019	Golden Bud - The Fourth Network Film And Television Festival	Top 10 Excellent Web Series	Gank Your Heart	Won	
2019	Golden Bud - The Fourth Network Film And Television Festival	New Force of the Year	Wang Zixuan	Won	
2019	2019 Weibo TV Series Awards	Most Popular Actor	Wang Yibo	Nominated	
2019	2019 Weibo TV Series Awards	Top 10 Popular Dramas	Gank Your Heart	Won	
2020	30th China TV Golden Eagle Award	Outstanding Television Series	Gank Your Heart	Nominated	
2020	30th China TV Golden Eagle Award	Best Original Soundtrack	"Burning Adventure"	Nominated	
2020	30th China TV Golden Eagle Award	Audience's Choice For Actor	Wang Yibo	Won	

== Original soundtrack ==
Gank Your Heart OST album was released in June 2019 digitally.

No.	Title	Singer	Length
1.	"Burning Adventure (最燃的冒险)" (Opening theme song)	Wang Yibo	4:46
2.	"Beyond the Sky (天空之外)" (Ending theme song)	Xuan Zi	4:56
3.	"If (如果说)"	Xu Yunxiao & Yang Antong	4:54
4.	"Rather than Love (重制版)"	Xu Yunxiao	4:17
5.	"Yes or No"	Luna Yin	3:22
6.	"Instant Love (瞬间爱恋)"	Luna Yin	3:17
7.	"Restfulness (安心)"	Luna Yin	3:16
8.	"Sight Kiss (目光之吻)"	Ding Guansen	3:50
