= Lu Yangyang =

Chinese singer and actress

- 卢洋洋
- Born: Lu Yangyang; February 19, 1994 (age 32); Shandong, China
- Other name: Hanna
- Education: Qilu Normal University
- Occupations: Singer; actress
- Musical career
- Origin: South Korea; China
- Genres: K-pop; C-pop
- Instrument: Vocals
- Years active: 2015–present
- Labels: Chiko; Lu Yangyang Studio
- Formerly of: MIXX

Chinese name
- Traditional Chinese: 盧洋洋
- Simplified Chinese: 卢洋洋
- Hanyu Pinyin: Lú Yángyáng
- Wade–Giles: Lu Yangyang

Korean name
- Hangul: 노양양
- RR: No Yangyang
- MR: No Yangyang

Stage name
- Hangul: 한나
- RR: Hanna
- MR: Hanna

Lu Yangyang (Chinese: 卢洋洋; born February 19, 1994), is a mainland Chinese singer and actress based in China and South Korea. She was the leader and member of the South Korean girl group MIXX. As an actress, she is best known for her role in the film Wish You Were Here (2019) and television series such as I Won't Get Bullied by Girls (2018), Gank Your Heart (2019), Chasing Love (2019), Whirlwind Magician (2021), Assistant of Superstar (2022) and Let's Meet Now (2022).

== Early life ==
Lu was born on February 19, 1994, in Shandong, China. She graduated from Qilu Normal University.

== Career ==
=== 2016–2017: Debut with MIXX and disbandment ===
On May 3, 2016, Lu made her debut with MIXX with the first single "Oh Ma Mind". Lu made her acting debut in 2017 with the film Jun He Adventures.

=== 2017–present: Acting debut and rising popularity ===
Lu starred in Narration Crisis which aired in July 2017. Lu made her small screen debut in the Youku romantic comedy television series I Won't Get Bullied by Girls alongside Cai Xukun. The series aired on April 12, 2018. She gained more recognition after starring in the film Wish You Were Here, which was released on April 12, 2019. Lu also played supporting roles in the television series Gank Your Heart, Chasing Love. In 2020, Lu starred in First Romance.

In 2021, Lu starred in My Handsome Roommate and the iQiyi's television series Whirlwind Magician. Lu was also the main female lead of Assistant of Superstar which was aired on February 14, 2022, on iQiyi. Her domestic popularity rose after starring in the romantic comedy Let's Meet Now which aired on iQiyi on September 9, 2022.

== Discography ==
=== Singles ===
Title	Year	Peak chart position		Sales	Album
Title	Year	CHN	KOR	Sales	Album
Soundtrack appearances
"恋爱辞典 (女生版)" (with Bu Guanjin, Li Yitong and Hong Xiao)	2019	—	—	—N/a	Chasing Ball OST
"明明就"	2019	—	—	—N/a	Chasing Ball OST
"你,是我最好的记忆"	2021	—	—	—N/a	My Handsome Roommate OST
"勇敢去爱"	2021	—	—	—N/a	Whirlwind Magician OST Part 1
"—" denotes releases that did not chart or were not released in that region.

== Filmography ==
=== Film ===
Year	Title		Role	Notes	Ref.
Year	English	Chinese	Role	Notes	Ref.
2016	Jun He Adventures	君贺奇遇记	Jun Youqing	Acting debut	
2017	Narration Crisis	异变危机	Yang Jiaduo		
2019	Wish You Were Here	在乎你	Yuan Yuan		
2019	If Thoughts Can Kill	他她他她 / 一念	Han Wenwen		

=== Television series ===
Year	Title		Role	Notes	Ref.
Year	English	Chinese	Role	Notes	Ref.
2018	I Won't Get Bullied by Girls	我才不会被女孩子欺负呢	Ren Xiaoqin		
2019	Gank Your Heart	陪你到世界之巅	Fu Miya		
2019	Chasing Love	追球	Bai Wei		
2020	First Romance	初恋了那么多年	Tang Tang		
2021	My Handsome Roommate	住在我家的花美男	Mo Yi		
2021	Whirlwind Magician	旋风魔术师	Cheng Moli		
2022	Assistant of Superstar	天王助理	Yuchi Yao Yao		
2022	Let's Meet Now	见面吧就现在	Ji Qiu		
TBA	Me After You	遇见你	Chen Chujun		
