= Cai Xukun =

Chinese singer-songwriter (born 1998)

- 蔡徐坤
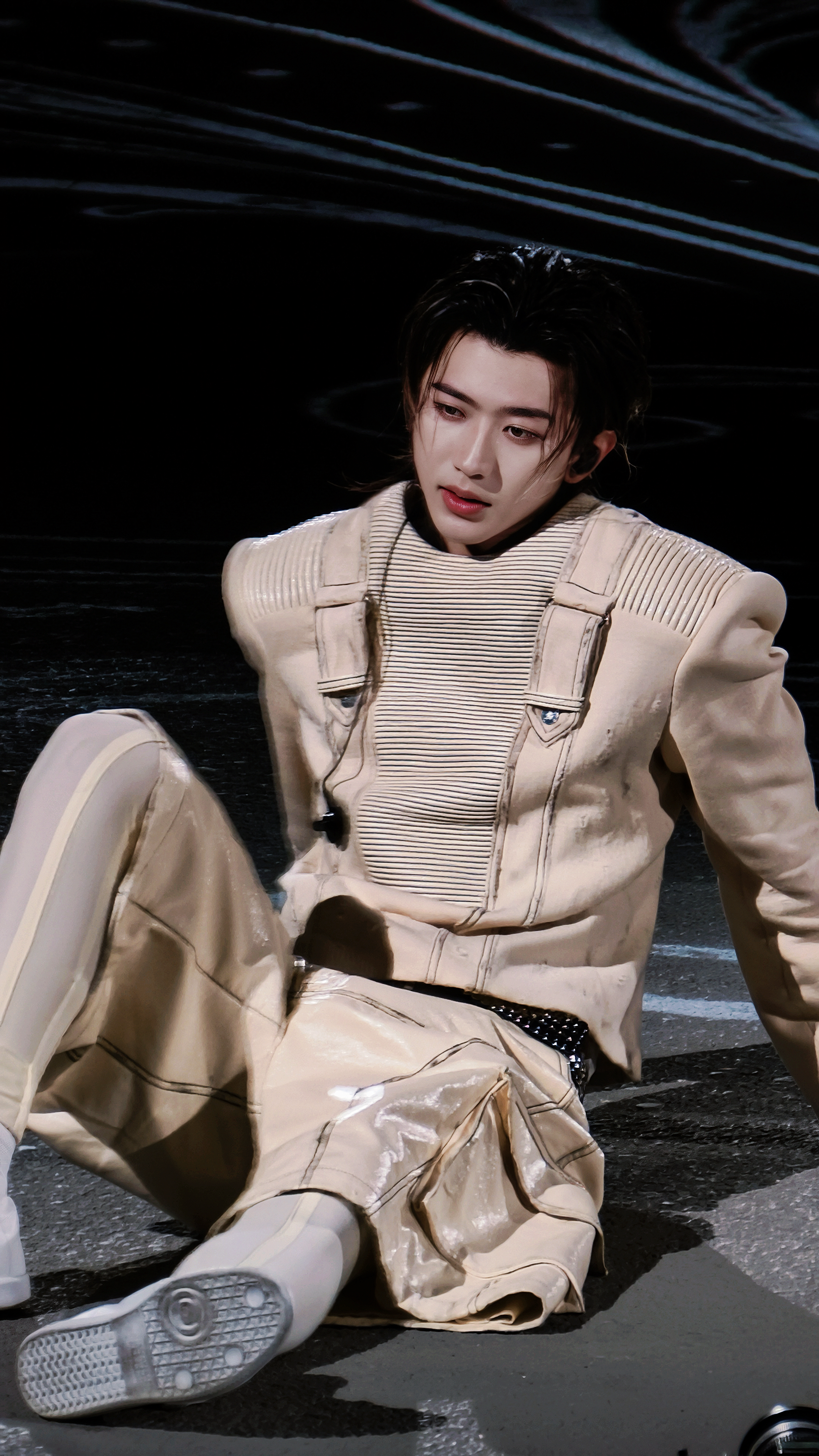
- Kun at The Deadman Concert Macau 2026
- Born: August 2, 1998 (age 28); Wenzhou, Zhejiang, China
- Other name: Kun
- Occupations: Singer-songwriter; dancer; actor
- Years active: 2012–present
- Musical career
- Genres: C-pop; Contemporary R&B; Classic pop; Soul; Jazz; Rock; Funk
- Instrument: Vocals
- Label: Kun Studio
- Formerly of: Nine Percent; Swin
- Website: Official website

Chinese name
- Chinese: 蔡徐坤
Transcriptions
Standard Mandarin
- Hanyu Pinyin: Cài Xúkūn
- Bopomofo: ㄘㄞˋ ㄒㄩˊ ㄎㄨㄣ
- Wade–Giles: ts'ai hsü k'un

Cai Xukun (born August 2, 1998), also known by the mononym Kun (stylized as KUN), is a Chinese singer-songwriter and actor. After participating in the first and second seasons of the Chinese reality show Super Idol, he joined boy group SWIN and its sub-unit SWIN-S in 2016. He rose to fame in 2018 with iQIYI's talent show Idol Producer, where he finished first and formed the temporary boy group Nine Percent, before pursuing a solo career. He was a cast member of the variety show Keep Running from 2020 to 2022.

== Early life ==
Kun was born on August 2, 1998, in Wenzhou, Zhejiang. He spent part of his childhood in Huaihua, Hunan with his grandparents, and grew up in Shenzhen, Guangdong. During his time in elementary school, he was chosen to be the principal's assistant and student union's president, and participated in various essay writing competitions. Kun was also selected as a candidate for TFBoys, but decided to focus on his schooling as his parents thought that he was too young to join the entertainment industry. After graduating from elementary school, he moved to Shenzhen to complete middle school at Shenzhen Nanshan Foreign Language School (formerly Shenzhen Nanshan Second Experimental High School).

== Career ==
=== 2012–2014: Start of career ===
In April 2012, Kun participated in Hunan TV's variety show Up Young! and ranked in the national top 200, which allowed him to enter the stage. In August of that year, Kun began his acting career, playing the role of Du Yu Feng's teenage version (portrayed by Lee Joon-hyuk) in Half a Fairytale. After that, he also played the role of Xixi in Hunan TV's television series Female Criminal-Police Officer Li Chunchun. In 2014, he played the teenage version of Huo Ke (portrayed by He Jiong) in Lock Me Up, Tie Him Down.

=== 2015–2017: Super Idol (星动亚洲) ===
In 2015, Kun returned from the U.S. to participate in the South Korean-based reality show Super Idol. The show was produced by Anhui TV, in partnership with the South Korean broadcast network MBC. During the two seasons of the show, Kun experienced constant pressure and fierce competition from other participants, receiving intensive idol training. After about two years on the show, Kun's performance skills saw an unprecedented improvement, earning him a spot in the Top 3. Upon the end of Season 2, Kun returned to China, where he debuted as a member of the Chinese boy group SWIN under Yihai Entertainment Company. As the group had already accumulated a sizable fan base, the debut was highly anticipated by both the members and their fans. However, the group's performance opportunities and public appearances were limited during its time with Yihai Entertainment, and observers reported a decline in the group's popularity. In the beginning of 2017, Kun filed a lawsuit against Yihai Entertainment Company to terminate his contract.

=== 2018: Idol Producer (偶像练习生) and rise in popularity ===
After a period of dormancy from the entertainment industry, Kun decided to join Season 1 of reality survival show Idol Producer as an independent trainee at the end of 2017.

Kun performed his self-written and self-composed song "I Wanna Get Love" in the first episode. Despite some controversy, Kun attracted a large fanbase. He quickly rose to fame and became a hot topic for discussion on the survival show. In addition to receiving considerably high votes after each evaluation performance in the show, Kun also earned rank no. 1 multiple times and maintained a high ranking throughout the entire program. He received a total of 47,640,887 votes in the final evaluation, earning him the center position in the final line-up. On April 6, 2018, Kun officially debuted as the leader and center of the temporary Chinese boy group Nine Percent.

Soon after the end of Idol Producer, I Won't Get Bullied by Girls, the web-drama starring Kun filmed in 2017, was released. Kun took on his first lead role as Ye Lin, the love interest of Ren Xiaoqin (portrayed by Lu Yangyang). The show is a teen comedy series that features a distinctive wardrobe and draws heavy influence from Japanese manga as a means to achieve comic relief. By 3 May, the series had accumulated over 700 million views.

From April to May 2018, Kun's first single, "I Wanna Get Love," topped the 'Mainland China C-pop Single Chart' as China's number 1 single for almost three weeks. At the end of May, Kun was voted as one of the most influential celebrities in China. For the three months between May and July, Kun had a full schedule, consisting of fan meeting tours across China with Nine Percent. On June 2, Kun and other members of Nine Percent had their first group appearance on the variety show Happy Camp.

In July, Kun set up his own personal studio. On August 2, 2018, his 20th birthday, Kun released the EP 1 for free. It contains three songs, "Pull Up", "You Can Be My Girlfriend", and "It's You". According to QQ Music, 'Pull Up' achieved multiple sales/streaming milestones shortly after release. "Pull Up" was co-written with UK songwriting team Mike Macdermid, David Brant (who is also the producer on the song), Rajiv Bukhory, Fidel Rosales and Ryan Curtis. He also edited the music video for "Pull Up". Kun later released another single, "Wait Wait Wait," on August 23, which quickly rose to the top of multiple music charts. His first stage performance of "Wait Wait Wait" aired during the first episode of Idol Hits on September 7.

On October 12, Kun performed "You Can Be My Girlfriend" live for the first time at the "'BAZAAR Stars' Charity Night" and donated 600,000 RMB for Bazaar's charity project. Over the next two days, Kun partnered with MiGu Music and successfully held his first set of small-scale fan meetings in Chengdu and Shanghai. On the last day of October, Kun delivered his first stage performance of "Pull Up" at the "Ellemen Movie Hero Gala" in Beijing. On November 7, Nine Percent released their first original song, "Rule Breaker", one of the tracks in their album To the Nines. Kun co-wrote the lyrics of "Rule Breaker" and "Good Things". Rule Breaker was written by some of the same writers as "Pull Up", namely Mike Macdermid, Rajiv Bukhory, David Brant, and in addition, US-based producer Kevin Chozen took the helm on production.

At the Twelfth Annual Migu Music Awards, held on December 8, Kun's "Wait Wait Wait" was ranked one of the Top Ten Pop Songs of the Year. This marked the first major award Kun received for his musical work. On December 28, TC Candler & The Independent Critics released their highly awaited List of The 100 Most Handsome Faces of 2018, taking into account the large pool of public opinion and suggestions, where Kun has been ranked as having the 27th Most Handsome Face in 2018. On December 30, Kun performed "You Can Be My Girlfriend" and "Wait Wait Wait" at Zhejiang Television's New Year's Eve Concert. On the very next day, he unveiled his first stage performance of "It's You" at the "Dragon TV New Year's Eve Gala" in Shanghai.

=== 2019: Ambassador of China and Jamaica, new songs and solo tour ===
On January 10, 2019, Kun was awarded the title of "China and Jamaica's Goodwill Ambassador" by the Jamaican Embassy in Shanghai, China. With this honorable title, Kun called on mutual cultural exchanges between China and Jamaica. He said that he hopes to become a positive role-model for the younger generation. Less than a week later, the theme song of the movie The Knight of Shadows: Between Yin and Yang, "The Lunar Song" (一起笑出来), was released. This song marks a noteworthy collaboration between Kun and Jackie Chan.

On January 18, the first episode of Cai Xukun's Unfinished, a documentary series initiated by Sina Weibo, was released. This short video series spans across various themes close to his heart and is expected to run for 12 episodes. The next day, Kun released an artistic music video for "Wait Wait Wait", directed by Dave Meyers. The award-winning director and his international team created a highly cinematic and storytelling music video using a series of symbolic elements, to allude to the message behind the song.

On February 5, the first day of the Chinese New Year in 2019, Kun performed an exclusive stage set at Beijing TV's Spring Festival Gala, delivering a song he co-wrote with other musicians. "That Spring" (那年春天) marked the first time he performed a song that was written entirely in Chinese. He later revealed his intention to dedicate the song as an exclusive performance for Beijing TV, and hence he will not be releasing a studio version of it. On the 18th of that month, Kun released his first Chinese single, "No Accident" (没有意外). The song was a collaboration between two musicians, with composition by Yoga Lin and lyrics written by Kun. A week later, on February 26, an animated music video for "No Exception" was released. The music video, created by a group of artists from a South Korean-based publishing and film-making studio, VCRWORKS, employs abstract elements and snippets from Kun's life to recount his story. Attempting to relate his own story with a personal narrative while being aligned to the overall theme of the song, Kun chose a controlled and melodic singing style when delivering this melancholic ballad. "No Exception" once again rose to the number one position on multiple music charts in China, setting an impressive record on music streaming platforms for 2019.

On March 1, Kun announced the dates for his first solo tour, "KUN ONE North America/U.K. Tour 2019", which included Vancouver, San Francisco, Los Angeles, New York, and London, from April 4 to April 12, 2019. The tickets for the Los Angeles and New York shows were sold out online within the first few minutes they went on sale. On March 15, Kun released his first DJ mix, "Bigger" on Spotify, and it was one of the tracks performed at his solo tour in April. The release date for "Bigger" was slated for March 22 in China.

On April 19, Kun released a song titled "Hard to Get". Prior to the song's release, Kun updated his social media accounts with three photos in succession, captioned 'H', 'T' and 'G'. The song was first performed during his first solo tour. The music video was released on May 3 through Kun's new YouTube Channel.

On May 16, Kun attended the opening ceremony of the Asian Film and TV Week. On May 24 and 25, Kun finished the last two shows of his KUN ONE tour in Toronto and Vancouver.

Kun was invited to be a guest judge for the 11th episode of the World's Got Talent, filmed in Hunan, China. He also delivered a special performance with a mix of "It's You" and "Hard to Get". The episode was broadcast on June 28 and immediately became a Hot Topic on Weibo. For the first time in its history, the program was the Most Discussed Variety Show of the day.

On July 26, Kun released the single Young. Its music video was filmed in multiple locations around the world, including Shanghai, Seoul, Taipei, Beijing and LA. Kun actively took part in the creation process, including production, developing ideas for the music video, editing, helping out with the choreography and designing the cover of the EP. The EP reported 63 million digital sales/streams in 2019, which the report described as a leading figure for that year. In just 1 minute and 21 seconds, the EP achieved 9 of QQ Music's awards and caused the creation of two more certifications. Altogether the EP earned more than 20 million yuan.

On October 31, Kun performed his single "Rebirth" (重生) at the 2019 Fresh Asia Music Awards and released it on November 15. It was re-released in January 2020 as a collaboration with the renowned American producer and DJ Kshmr. This was a breakthrough for Kun, as it was the first time he had ever collaborated with a foreign artist on a single. The song expresses Kun's desire to break through his shell and show a fearless side to him. The arrangement creates a sense of emptiness and the mysterious EDM elements are combined with his bursting attitude. The lyrics were written by Kun himself which makes the song personal to him and describes another step in his journey.

=== 2020: Youth With You and "Lover" ===
In the beginning of January 2020, it was announced that Kun would be the Youth Representative of iQiyi's Youth with You Season 2. It is the third season of the Chinese survival show Idol Producer, which created Kun's former group Nine Percent from the first season and Unine from its second season. He was on the show as a mentor alongside Lisa of Blackpink, Ella Chen, and Jony J.

In March, Kun and actress Tong Liya released a song titled "The Mountains and Rivers Are on My Chest" (山河无恙在我胸) to help boost the morale of those fighting against the COVID-19 pandemic, which won the 2020 Migu Music Public Welfare Influence Award. In April, he joined the cast of Keep Running alongside Lucas of WayV/NCT and Yuqi of (G)I-dle. He also released the single "Home" that same month to help support those who were under lock-down during the COVID-19 pandemic. After its release, #蔡徐坤新歌 (#Cai Xukun new song) started trending on Weibo, Douyin, QQ Music, NetEase Cloud Music, Xiami Music and other search lists, reaching the top of trending lists in 20 minutes.

On May 24, Kun released his newest single "Lover". The day after its release, it ranked first on QQ Music's charts. "Lover" was first released to the public on the Chinese survival show Youth with You Season 2 as a collaboration between Kun and the trainees on the show, this version ranked second on QQ Music's charts. Kun took part in the songwriting process, and co-produced it with Korean YG producer Choice37. "Lover" was the most downloaded collaboration stage song of the competition with more than 100,000 downloads after its release. Due to its success, the hashtag #情人舞挑战 (#Lovers Dance Challenge) has been used over 400 million times on Chinese social platforms, including Weibo and Douyin, and the studio version of the single (without the trainees) has been listened to over 30 million times with 1 million daily listeners.

At the end of the year, he ranked 31st on the Forbes China Celebrity 100 list.

=== 2021–2022: First studio album, Madame Tussauds Hong Kong and "Hug Me" ===
On April 6, 2021, Kun announced on both Weibo and Instagram that his new album would be available soon, and on April 9, 2021, he released the names of the first 4 tracks. The album, 迷, exceeded 1 million pre-orders within 2 hours of release on QQ Music, making him the fastest artist to do so in 2021. He took part in the album's production and A&R plannin, and also served as the director of the MV for "#0000FF". Within 24 hours of its launch, the album won the top five album sales award on Tencent Music.

On December 16, Madame Tussauds Hong Kong revealed Kun's wax figure, which wears the outfit he wore on World's Got Talent in 2019 and joins the attraction's "Fashion Zone".

On July 2, 2022, Kun released the single "Hug Me". The single became a hit, becoming one of the top ten most streamed songs of 2022 on the two major Chinese music platforms, QQ Music and NetEase Cloud Music. He released a remix of "Hug Me" On June 22, 2023.

=== 2023: Art Lab1, Kun World Tour 2023 and new song release ===
On February 23, 2023, Kun announced his first live concert Kun 2023 Art Lab Live. On March 22, Kun announced his 2023 World Tour-迷宫重启, which included stops in Macau, Hong Kong, Bangkok, Singapore, and Kuala Lumpur.

On October 9, after his Kuala Lumpur Concert, Kun released his new song "Spotlight" live version during his concert. On November 22, Kun released the single "Spotlight".

=== 2024–2025: New songs, Grammy Global Spin, Billboard Global No. 1 and more ===
On January 31, 2024, Kun released the single "Ride or Die". After its release, the song quickly climbed to No. 1 on QQ Music; it also became the most recommended song of the week and the best-selling song of the week. In June, Kun released another single, "Afterglow," which is a collaboration with Versace. The song rose to the top in many Chinese music platforms after it was released. It was on the Top 7 of US iTunes and Top 1 of Singapore, Cambodia, Malaysia, and Hong Kong iTunes, and was also on iTunes in Macau, Vietnam, Thailand, Taiwan, Netherlands, Australia, and Belgium.

On May 28, 2025, Kun released his single "Deadman". In June 2025, Kun was announced as a special guest performer at Head in the Clouds Los Angeles. Kun was also announced as part of the line-up for Head in the Clouds New York, which will be held on September 20. In July, Kun announced that he will have a One Night Only show at The Fonda Theatre in Los Angeles, which will be held on August 2, 2025, as his birthday present for his fans.

=== 2026: Self-titled album, tour, Met Gala, and more ===
In 2026, Kun released his second studio album KUN, on February 6 through 88rising. The self-titled album marked his first full-length English-language project and featured the singles "Deadman", "What a Day", and "Colder". The album was co-written and co-produced by Kun and explored influences from pop, rock, soul, jazz, and R&B.

In April 2026, Kun embarked on An Evening With KUN, a concert tour in support of the album. The tour visited cities across North America and Europe, including Los Angeles, San Francisco, Dallas, Chicago, New York City, Washington, D.C., London, and Paris. The setlist featured songs from KUN alongside selections from his previous releases. The opening show at The Novo in Los Angeles sold out with approximately 2,400 attendees, compared with a sold-out performance at the Fonda Theatre in August 2025 that drew about 1,200 attendees.

In May 2026, Kun attended the Met Gala in New York City, making his second appearance at the event. He wore a custom Thom Browne ensemble inspired by the visual concept of his single "Deadman", featured on his new album.

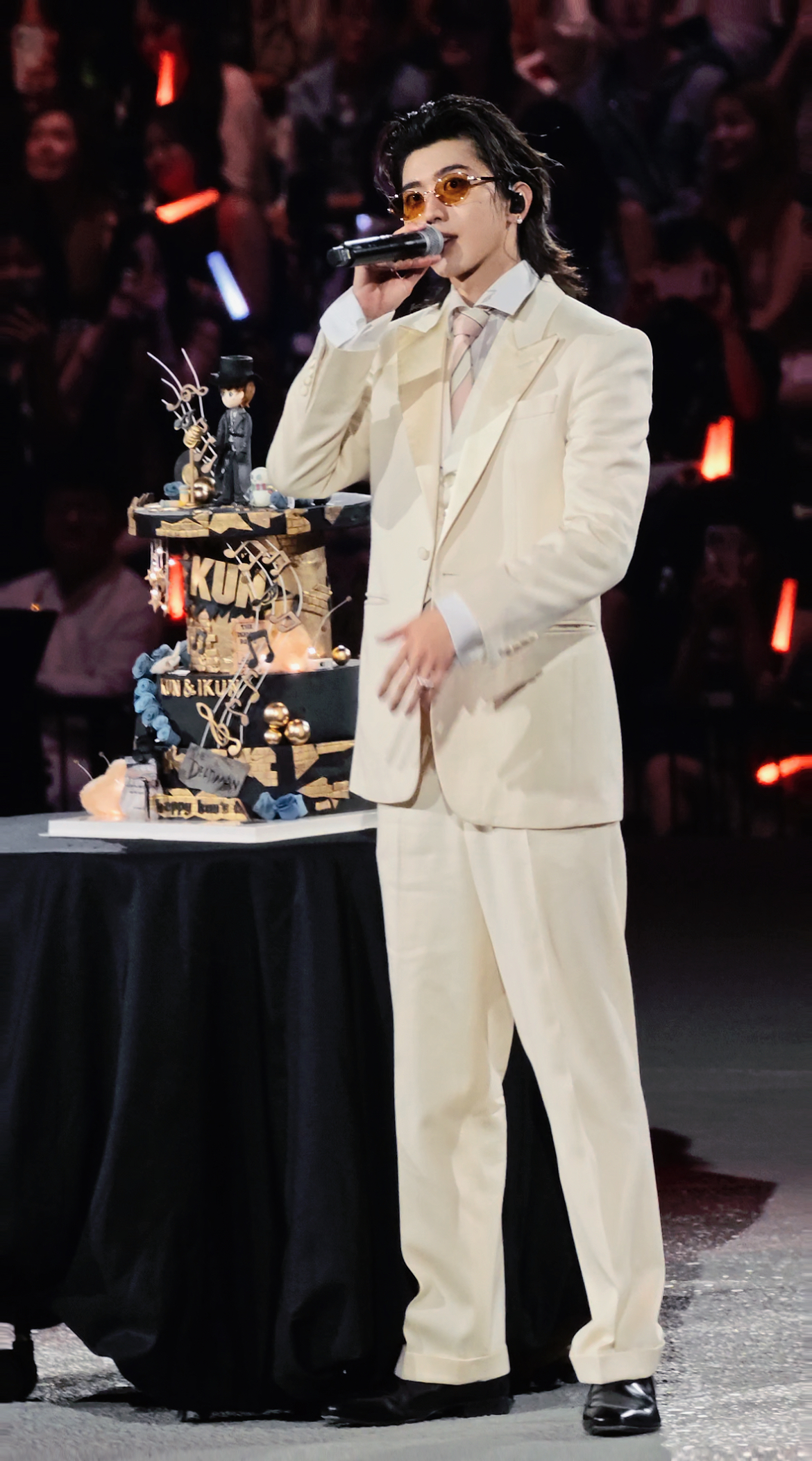
Kun celebrates his birthday during the concert

In 2026, Kun announced The Deadman Tour, with its opening concerts taking place at The Venetian Arena in Macau on 2–3 August 2026. Following the successful launch of the tour, the second stop was announced for Singapore, with the concert scheduled for 24 October 2026 at Singapore Indoor Stadium.

== Endorsements and ambassadorships ==
In 2018, Kun was chosen to be the brand ambassador for the skin care line by Yoseido, the parent company of Nongfu Spring. He was also named the promotional representative for L'Oréal Paris and a model for the smartphone technological giant Vivo. On October 19, 2018, Aussie of Procter & Gamble named Kun as their global spokesperson.

On January 1, 2019, Levi's announced Kun as its brand ambassador. On May 31, Prada named Kun as its China ambassador, making him the first Chinese spokesperson for the brand and a face of its Fall/Winter 2019 advertising campaign. Kun also attended Prada's Menswear Spring 2020 Fashion Show, which was held in Shanghai for the first time. In June, Vivo announced Kun as the brand face for its new S1 mobile series.

In 2020, Kun became the brand ambassador for multiple brands, including Kosé, Givenchy Beauty, as well as domestic brands such as Proya. Kun has also become the new spokesperson for Fila, an Italian sportswear company, and attended the brand's press conference in Shanghai on July 10, 2020.

In 2021, British fragrance brand Jo Malone appointed Kun as its brand ambassador, along with hair brand Schwarzkopf and other domestic brands. Since 2023, Prada Beauty has named Kun as Prada Fragrance ambassador.

In 2022, Swiss watches and accessory manufacturer TAG Heuer named Kun its Chinese ambassador, with the brand's chief executive officer Frédéric Arnault stating that "[Kun] has demonstrated remarkable talent in songwriting and performing" in addition to being "incredibly athletic, truly daring and never stops challenging the limits," which matches the brand's mindset.

In 2023, the South Korean sunglasses and optical glasses brand Gentle Monster announced on April 17 via their social media platforms that they are collaborating with Kun, who will work as the director for their "Crystal Clear" project. The line will launch on April 21, 2023, and the event app will be available in mainland China, Taiwan, Hong Kong, South Korea, Dubai, Singapore, Japan, and the United States.

In May 2024, the Italian luxury fashion brand Versace appointed Kun as its global brand ambassador. The brand posted a preview of Kun's "Afterglow" on their website and Spotify, followed by a message from Kun. In August, Kun was appointed the global brand ambassador of Avia, a footwear company. On December 20, Maison Margiela Fragrances announced Kun as spokesperson for Bath and Body through Weibo.

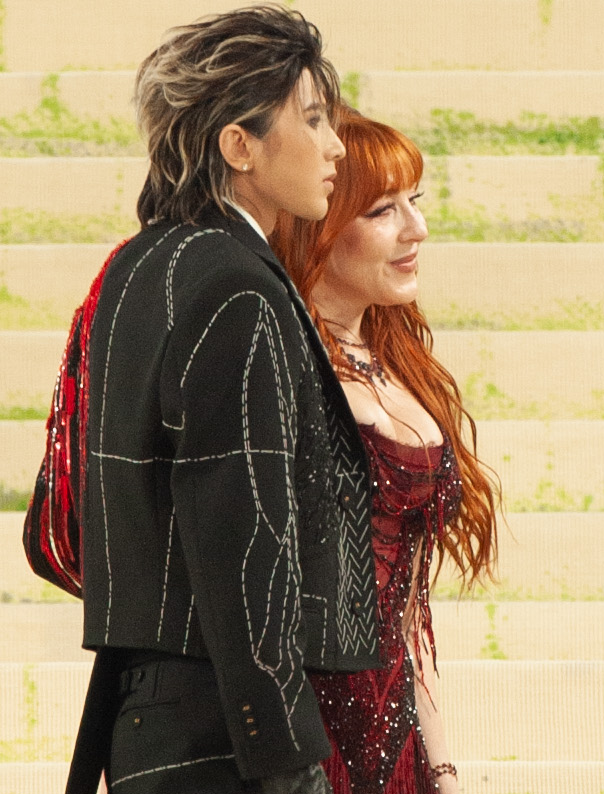
Kun with Charlotte Tilbury at the 2026 Met Gala

On February 11, 2025, Mugler Fragrance announced Kun as their global brand ambassador for Mugler Angel Fantasm. On February 28, Charlotte Tilbury Beauty announced Kun as its global makeup ambassador. The collaboration’s theme is "Born Legendary, Extraordinary Underlying." On April 19, Kun was announced as the global brand ambassador for XIONGMAO熊猫户外服饰. On July 21, Kun was announced as global brand ambassador for Shu Uemura Art of Hair. On August 22, Kun was announced as global brand ambassador for Boneless. On September 22, Kun was announced as global brand ambassador for SIMPCARE. On September 26, Kun was announced as Nautica's global brand ambassador.

On October 3, Kun was announced as Murad Skincare's Asia-Pacific brand ambassador. On December 4, Kun was announced as PUBG: Battlegrounds' global brand ambassador.

Since 2026, KUN has served as a global brand ambassador for Ositree, Tasaki, LinLee, BUV, and Bio-E. In the same year, he was also appointed as a brand ambassador for Saucony and MARUBI.

As of August 2026, Kun has sixteen active brand endorsements.

- Previous endorsements
  - 2018: Yoseido (brand ambassador)
  - 2018: L'Oréal Paris (friend of brand)
  - 2018–2019: Yep (brand ambassador)
  - 2018: Vivo S23 (brand ambassador)
  - 2018: Aussie (global brand ambassador)
  - 2019: Levi's (brand ambassador)
  - 2019–2023: Prada (global brand ambassador)
  - 2019: Vivo S1 Pro (brand ambassador)
  - 2019: Vivo S5 (brand ambassador)
  - 2020: Molsion Eyewear (brand ambassador)
  - 2020–2021: Suncut (brand ambassador)
  - 2020: Proya (brand ambassador)
  - 2020: Anmuxi (brand ambassador)
  - 2020–2021: Givenchy Beauty (brand ambassador)
  - 2020–2021: Fila (brand ambassador)
  - 2020: Nescafé (brand ambassador)
  - 2020–2021: Schwarzkopf (brand ambassador)
  - 2020: Vivo S7 (brand ambassador)
  - 2020–2021: Hp (brand ambassador)
  - 2021–2023: YANJING Beer (brand ambassador)
  - 2021–2023: KangShiFu (brand ambassador)
  - 2021: Vivo S9 (brand ambassador)
  - 2021–2022: Watsons (brand ambassador)
  - 2021–2023: De Beers (brand ambassador)
  - 2021–2023: Pepsi (brand ambassador)
  - 2021: Clé de Peau Beauté (brand ambassador)
  - 2021–2022: Panasonic Beauty (brand ambassador)
  - 2021: Vivo S10 (brand ambassador)
  - 2021: Vinda (brand ambassador)
  - 2021: Jo Malone (brand ambassador)
  - 2021: Vivo S12 (brand ambassador)
  - 2022–2023: Moccona (brand ambassador)
  - 2022–2023: INXNI (brand ambassador)
  - 2022–2023: Prada Perfume (brand ambassador)
  - 2022–2023: TAG Heuer (brand ambassador)
  - 2022–2023: Effectim (brand ambassador)
  - 2022–2023: LiQuan Beers (brand ambassador)
  - 2022–2023: Tide (brand ambassador)
  - 2023: Mistine (global brand ambassador)
  - 2023: Meco (brand ambassador)
  - 2023: LionK Beers (brand ambassador)
  - 2024–2025: Versace (global brand ambassador)
  - 2024: Mistine (global brand ambassador)
  - 2024–2025: Maison Margiela Fragrances for Bath & Body (brand ambassador)
  - 2025–2026: Mugler Fragrances (global brand ambassador)
  - 2025–2026: Xiongmao (熊猫户外服饰) (global brand ambassador)
- Present endorsements
  - 2024–present: Avia (global brand ambassador)
  - 2025–present: Charlotte Tilbury (global brand ambassador)
  - 2025–present: Mobile Legends: Bang Bang (collaborate)
  - 2025–present: Shu Uemura Art of Hair (global brand ambassador)
  - 2025–present: Boneless (global brand ambassador)
  - 2025–present: Simpcare (global brand ambassador)
  - 2025–present: Nautica (global brand ambassador)
  - 2025–present: Murad Skincare (Asia-Pacific brand ambassador)
  - 2025–present: PUBG: Battlegrounds (global brand ambassador)
  - 2026–present: Ositree (global brand ambassador)
  - 2026–present: Tasaki (global brand ambassador)
  - 2026–present: BUV (global brand ambassador)
  - 2026–present: Saucony (brand ambassador)
  - 2026–present: Bio-E (global brand ambassador)
  - 2026–present: Lin Lee (global brand ambassador)
  - 2026–present: MARUBI (global brand ambassador)

== Artistry ==
=== Influences ===
Kun has said to be influenced by Stevie Wonder, Lana Del Rey, Elvis Presley, and David Bowie.

=== Themes and genres ===
Kun has composed and produced most of his solo works by himself, including "I Wanna Get Love", his EP 1 and "Wait Wait Wait". He also co-wrote lyrics of "Rule Breaker" and "Good Things", two tracks from Nine Percent's album To the Nines. He's said to have very diverse music styles, ranging from future R&B, urban R&B, hip-hop, pop, dance to electronic soul.

== Philanthropy ==
Since his debut, Kun often uses his social platforms to encourage his fans to participate and do their part for good causes.

In August 2018, Kun donated 32,000 RMB to a private non-profit autism rehabilitation facility for children older than six years old. On October 13, 2018, Kun performed at the Bazaar Stars Charity Night and anonymously donated 600,000 RMB. The funds raised were used to build facilities that enable students in rural areas to pursue extracurricular activities, such as learning music.

On November 29, 2018, Kun paired up with a traditional musician from the Yi ethnic group in Sichuan and filmed a short program for the "Tracing the Influence of Music" project organized by Migu Music. The idea of the project was to raise awareness and preserve distinctive music, cultures and instruments from ancient China.

In December 2018, Kun joined the Star Lights "Battle Against Poverty" project, a charity movement initiated by Jackie Chan, which has garnered the support of many A-list Chinese celebrities. Along with a crew of cameramen from the Chinese television channel CCTV-6, Kun visited a poverty-stricken area on Hainan Island to film his efforts as part of the project. Through a live broadcast, Kun introduced local specialities and agricultural products to viewers across the country, hoping to boost tourism and increase the sales of local products, one of which was the salted duck egg. With Kun's popularity and positive influence, all 80,000 eggs sold out within a minute. "Cai Xukun's fans, please give the ducks some time" immediately became a trending topic on Weibo.

With Kun's advocacy for philanthropy, his fans have made significant contributions to different charity causes, including donations to purchase school supplies and build a new road in rural villages. By the end of 2018, the total charitable donations made by individual fans and fan clubs were approximately 5 million RMB.

On May 12, 2019, Kun was named the Goodwill Ambassador of the China Foundation for Poverty Alleviation. He pledged to promote social awareness for disaster prevention programs. On June 16, Ullens Center for Contemporary Art announced that Kun would be its Arts and Philanthropy Ambassador, promoting educational programs for children from under-represented backgrounds.

On June 17, an earthquake measuring 5.8 MW struck the province of Sichuan in China, killing 13 people and injuring over 200 others. Kun donated 100,000 RMB to support post-earthquake relief efforts and added another 30,000 RMB worth of books and school supplies for the local Gaoshankao Primary School.

Kun launched a charity fund to support impoverished children in remote Chinese areas on October 17, 2019. He donated over 600,000 RMB and stated that he would continue to donate 3 million RMB in the next three years, which will mainly be used to sponsor primary school choirs in these areas and will also provide support to other activities of other charities as part of the foundation's Spring Bud Plan implementation.

Kun donated 600,000 RMB on January 26, 2020, as support for medical purposes for those infected by the coronavirus outbreak in Wuhan, China. His fan clubs also raised a fund, which reached more than 500,000 RMB for the cause.

== Controversies ==
=== Contract dispute ===
On February 10, 2017, Kun filed a lawsuit against his then-company, Shanghai Yihai Entertainment, for poor treatment and the right to terminate his contract. Yihai was allegedly in arrears, and members of SWIN were said to have paid for all expenses of their activities, including their albums and fan meetings, without being reimbursed. Furthermore, Yihai demanded that each member sign a Debt Acknowledgment Letter for 1.1 million RMB (approximately US$165,000) to share the production costs for season 2 of Super Idol. In addition, the members had to sign an amendment to their original contract within an hour of notice. This new document decreased the share of the artists' pay and also extended the length of their contracts.

Soon after the broadcast of Idol Producer, Yihai filed another case in March 2018 to countersue Kun for the breach of contract, asking that he pay the company 1.1 million RMB for liquidated damages and compensation for their losses. They demanded that Kun continue to abide by the terms of the contract, allowing the former to be entitled to 70% of the income Kun earns from dramas, endorsements and variety shows.

In October 2018, the Court of First Instance rendered a decision favouring Kun, prompting Yihai to submit an appeal. In January 2019, a second trial was held. The court did not announce the verdict until February, with the final ruling issued on February 19, 2019. iQiyi released an exclusive report stating that the two-year dispute between Kun and Yihai has finally been settled, with Kun winning the case, hence being free from his contract.

=== NBA meme ===
On January 18, 2019, the NBA announced that Kun would be its first Chinese New Year greeting ambassador and released a holiday commercial featuring him as a basketball fan alongside three NBA star players. False claims that Kun was appointed the Ambassador of the NBA led to parody videos of a basketball clip from Kun's introductory video on Idol Producer circulating in response. Kun's Studio subsequently issued a legal notice to facilitate the possibility of legal recourse against the creators of the videos, arguing that they amounted to harassment, defamation and an infringement of Kun's rights. In response to the statement, "to issue a legal notice" quickly became a popular internet meme on Chinese social media sites.

=== Ms. C's and Ms. W's allegations ===
On June 26, 2023, an Internet user alleged that Kun had engaged in sexual relations in 2021 with a woman identified as "Ms. C", who underwent an abortion several months later, with Kun paying her 500,000 yuan (approximately 70,000 USD) in compensation. The same source also alleged that Kun's mother hired a private detective to surveil Ms. C and installed a pinhole camera outside her home, with the matter settled after Ms. C discovered the surveillance and contacted the police. Shortly after, another Internet user identified as “Ms. W” accused Kun through a paparazzi outlet of committing a date rape when she was 17. Amid the allegations, Kun's videos were removed from China Central Television's streaming platform, suggesting a potential blacklisting by the authorities.

On July 3, 2023, Kun posted an apology on Weibo, stating that the relationship with Ms. C was between two consenting adults and that the abortion was voluntary. Later that day, Kun denied Ms. W's allegations, citing false evidence presented by the paparazzi outlet on Weibo. In 2024, he sued both Ms. W and the involved paparazzi for defamation. In 2025, the court ruled in Kun's favor. Ms. W later claimed that her allegation of date rape had been fabricated as a fan of Kun, with the intention of enabling him to publicly refute it, divert attention from Ms. C's claims, and put to rest longstanding rumors that he had had sex with an underage fan. She said that although she regretted the fabrication and informed the paparazzi prior to publication, they proceeded regardless. Ms. W reported experiencing depression following Kun's lawsuit and accused Kun and his team of misleading the public by conflating her fabricated claim with Ms. C's allegations, creating a false impression that Kun had won a defamation case against Ms. C. Subsequently, Ms. W's Weibo account, which frequently discussed her legal case and criticized Kun's PR tactics, was shadowbanned. In June 2025, Ms. W attempted suicide and scheduled a suicide note for posting on Weibo, one of her few uncensored posts about Kun. In the note, she disclosed that she had not acted alone in 2023, but had informed Kun's executive agent, Wang Lenan, that the paparazzi had taken her bait prior to their publishing the false allegation, allowing Kun to file a police report approximately 10 minutes after the allegation appeared online. She also alleged that one reason she gained the trust of the paparazzi was by claiming that Cai's father was businessman Cai Zuola—who had been penalized, either administratively or criminally, under charges related to operating a casino overseas from 2016 to 2020, a potential time bomb in Cai's career—rather than the commonly misreported businessman Cai Dehua. Ms. W was later rescued.

== Concerts, showcase and tours ==
Tours / Concert

- KUN One Tour (2019): San Francisco, Los Angeles, New York City, London, Toronto, Vancouver
- KUN World Tour (2023): Macau, Hong Kong, Bangkok, Singapore, Kuala Lumpur
- An Evening With KUN (2026): Los Angeles, San Francisco, Dallas, Chicago, New York, Washington DC, London, Paris
- The Deadman (2026): Macau, Singapore

Showcase

- KUN One Night Only (August 2, 2025)

Music Festival

- Head in the Clouds Los Angeles (June 1, 2025)
- Head in the Clouds New York (September 20, 2025)
- Waterbomb Macau (November 9, 2025)
- Krazy Super Concert Dubai, UAE (February 17, 2026)
- Asia Top Music Festival, Sepang International Circuit, Selangor, Malaysia (May 30, 2026)

== Filmography ==
=== Films ===
Year	English title	Original title	Role	Notes
2012	Half a Fairytale	童话二分之一	Young Du Yu Feng	Teenage version of Lee Joon-hyuk
2012	Police Woman Li ChunChun	女刑警李春春	Xixi	
2014	Lock Me Up, Tie Him Down	完美假妻168	Young Huo Ke	Teenage version of He Jiong

=== Television series ===
Year	English Title	Original Title	Network	Role	Notes
2018	I Won't Get Bullied by Girls	我才不会被女孩子欺负呢	Youku	Ye Lin	Lead role

=== Television shows ===
Year	Title	Network	Notes	Role
2012	Up Young!	Hunan TV	Pre-debut	Contestant
2015	Super Idol: Season 1	MBC and Anhui TV	Team RED-X	Contestant
2016	Super Idol: Season 2	MBC and Anhui TV	Finished 3rd	Contestant
2018	Idol Producer	iQiyi	Finished 1st	Contestant
2019	New Year Celebrations	iQiyi	Hunan TV	Invited to perform
2019	蔡徐坤的未完成 (Cai Xukun's Unfinished)	Weibo	Presenter	
2020	Idol Producer Season 2: Youth With You	iQiyi	Host (Youth Representative)	
2020–2022	Keep Running	Zhejiang TV	Cast Member	

== Accolades ==
=== Awards and nominations ===
Award Ceremony	Year	Category	Nominee / Work	Result	Ref.
Asian Pop Music Awards	2021	Best Producer	Cai Xukun	Won	
Baidu Awards	2018	Most Artist's Fan Power Award	Cai Xukun	Won	
Berlin Music Video Awards	2026	Best Narrative	"Colder"	Nominated	
Chinese Top Ten Music Awards	2019	Most Popular Male Singer	Cai Xukun	Won	
Chinese Top Ten Music Awards	2019	Top 10 Songs of the Year	"Wait Wait Wait"	Won	
Chinese Top Ten Music Awards	2020	Best Male Singer	Cai Xukun	Won	
Chinese Top Ten Music Awards	2020	Most Popular Asian Singer	Cai Xukun	Won	
Chinese Top Ten Music Awards	2020	Internet Influence Award	Cai Xukun	Won	
Cosmo Awards	2018	Annual Idol Youth Award	Cai Xukun	Won	
Cosmo Awards	2019	Person of the Year	Cai Xukun	Won	
Cosmo Awards	2020	Person of the Year	Cai Xukun	Won	
Cosmo Awards	2020	Annual Idol Youth Award	Cai Xukun	Won	
Esquire Man At His Best Awards	2018	Man of the Year Award	Cai Xukun	Won	
Esquire Man At His Best Awards	2019	Man of the Year Award	Cai Xukun	Won	
Esquire Man At His Best Awards	2020	Man of the Year Award	Cai Xukun	Won	
Fresh Asia Music Awards	2019	Most Influential Idol of the Year	Cai Xukun	Won	
GQ Men of the Year Awards	2018	Newcomer of the Year	Cai Xukun	Won	
GQ Men of the Year Awards	2019	Idol of the Year	Cai Xukun	Won	
GQ Men of the Year Awards	2020	Upward Force of the Year	Cai Xukun	Won	
iQIYI Scream Night	2019	All-Rounded Star of the Year	Cai Xukun	Won	
iQIYI Scream Night	2020	Singer of the Year	Cai Xukun	Won	
iQIYI Scream Night	2020	Youth Producer of the Year	Cai Xukun	Won	
Migu Music Awards	2018	Golden Melody Award	"Wait Wait Wait"	Won	
Migu Music Awards	2018	Best Ringback Music Selling Singer	Cai Xukun	Won	
Migu Music Awards	2020	Most Popular Male Singer (Mainland China)	Cai Xukun	Won	
Migu Music Awards	2020	Best Male Singer	Cai Xukun	Won	
Migu Music Awards	2020	Top 10 Songs of the Year	"Lover"	Won	
People's Republic of China	2019	Outstanding Youth Leader	Cai Xukun	Won	
People's Republic of China	2019	Goodwill Ambassador of China – Jamaica	Cai Xukun	Won	
Sir Cultural and Entertainment Congress	2018	Annual Artist with the Most Commercial Value	Cai Xukun	Won	
Sogou Award Ceremony	2018	Annual Male Artist Popularity Award	Cai Xukun	Won	
Sogou Award Ceremony	2018	Peak Artist of the Year	Cai Xukun	Won	
Sohu Fashion Awards	2018	Popular Male Artist of the Year	Cai Xukun	Won	
Tencent Music Entertainment Awards	2020	Ten Best Songs of the Year	"Lover"	Won	
Tencent Music Entertainment Awards	2020	Most Inspiring Singer	Cai Xukun	Won	
Tencent Music Entertainment Awards	2020	Most Influential Singer-Songwriter	Cai Xukun	Won	
Tencent Music Entertainment Awards	2021	Most Influential Producer of the Year	Cai Xukun	Won	
Tencent Music Entertainment Awards	2021	Top 10 Golden Songs of the Year	"感受她 (Feeling Her)"	Won	
Tencent Video All Star Awards	2018	New Power Character of the Year	Cai Xukun	Won	
Tencent Video All Star Awards	2018	Music Star of the Year	Cai Xukun	Won	
Tencent Video All Star Awards	2019	Marketable Artist of the Year	Cai Xukun	Won	
Today's Headlines Annual Ceremony	2018	Annual Headline Icon of the Year	Cai Xukun	Won	
Today's Headlines Annual Ceremony	2018	Today's Headline Idol of the Year	Cai Xukun	Won	
Weibo Awards	2018	Popular Newcomer	Cai Xukun	Won	
Weibo Awards	2020	Most Popular Musician of the Year	Cai Xukun	Won	

=== Forbes China Celebrity 100 ===
Year	Rank	Ref.
2020	31st	
