= Hu Yunhao =

Chinese actor

- Born: June 27, 1989 (age 37); Beijing, China
- Other name: Harry
- Education: Tongji University, Shanghai Theater Academy
- Occupation: Actor
- Years active: 2015–present
- Agent: Linghe Culture
- Spouse: Sun Jing (m. 2017)

Chinese name
- Chinese: 胡耘豪
Transcriptions

Hu Yunhao (Chinese: 胡耘豪; born 27 June 1989), also known as Harry, is a Chinese actor.

== Filmography ==
=== Film ===
| Year | English title | Chinese title | Role | Notes |
|---|---|---|---|---|
| 2016 | The Mystic Nine Side Story: Four Belongs to Abelmoschus | 老九门番外之四屠黄葵 | Chen Pi Ah Si | |
| 2020 | No.9 Uniform | 9号球衣 | | |

=== Television series ===
| Year | English title | Chinese title | Role | Notes |
|---|---|---|---|---|
| 2015 | Darker II | 暗黑者2 | Rao Donghua | |
| 2016 | Wind Chime | 示铃录 | Shi Jiaxin | |
| 2016 | Campus Beauty | 贴身校花 | Mo Kuan | |
| 2016 | The Mystic Nine | 老九门 | Chen Pi Ah Si | Main Role |
| 2017 | The Hunting Genius | 寻人大师 | Lin Yuansu | Main Role |
| 2017 | A Chinese Odyssey: Love of Eternity | 大话西游之爱你一万年 | Erlang Shen | |
| 2018 | Like a Flowing River | 大江大河 | Lei Zhengming | |
| 2019 | Darker III | 暗黑者3 | Rao Donghua | |
| 2019 | Gank Your Heart | 陪你到世界之巅 | Luo Tian | |
| 2019 | Love is Deep | 浅情人不知 | Ning Weijin | Main Role |
| 2020 | Eternal Love of Dream | 三生三世枕上书 | Xia Guchou | |
| 2020 | Ultimate Note | 终极笔记 | Chen Pi A Si | Guest Role |
| 2020 | Like a Flowing River 2 | 大江大河2 | Lei Zhengming | |
| 2021 | Love Scenery | 良辰美景好时光 | Sun Bin Yu | |
| 2021 | To Fly With You | 陪你逐风飞翔 | Dr. Liu Jun | |
| TBA | Chong Zi | 重紫 | Yu Du | |
| TBA | Be My Princess | 影帝的公主 | Xiao Zhao | |

== Discography ==
| Year | English title | Chinese title | Role | Notes |
|---|---|---|---|---|
| 2016 | | 凉薄侯 | The Mystic Nine Side Story: Four Belongs to Abelmoschus OST | |

== Awards and nominations ==
| Year | Award | Category | Nominated work | Result | Ref. |
|---|---|---|---|---|---|
| 2016 | 6th iQiyi All-Star Carnival | Best New Actor | The Mystic Nine | Won | |
| 2017 | Golden Bud - The Second Network Film And Television Festival | New Face of the Year | —N/a | Won | |
