= Why (Jieqiong song) =

2018 debut single by Jieqiong

Single by Zhou Jieqiong

from the album Why
- Released: September 6, 2018
- Recorded: 2018
- Length: 2:39
- Label: Pledis
- Songwriters: 王雅君 (Tina Wang); Zhou Jieqiong
- Producer: Bumzu

"Why" is the debut solo single by Chinese singer Zhou Jieqiong released on September 6, 2018, which marks her solo debut since her debut with Pristin in 2016.

== Background ==
On August 31, 2018 Pledis Entertainment confirmed that Zhou would be making her solo debut in China on September 6, 2018 with digital single "Why".

== Composition ==
"Why" is a tropical sound, moombahton song with the lyrics talking about Zhou's confidence in being a confident woman.

== Promotions ==
Zhou had her solo debut stage in China the day after the song's release on iQiyi's Idol Hits.

== Charts ==
| Chart (2018) | Peak position |
|---|---|
| China (QQ) | 64 |
| Taiwan (KKBox) | 38 |

== Release history ==
| Region | Date | Format | Label |
|---|---|---|---|
| Various | September 6, 2018 | Digital download, streaming | Pledis Entertainment |
