= Miss Truth =

Chinese television show

- Drama poster
- Traditional Chinese: 大唐女法醫
- Simplified Chinese: 大唐女法医
- Hanyu Pinyin: Dàtáng Nǚ Fǎyī
- Genre: Historical; Suspense
- Based on: 大唐女法医 by Xiu Tang
- Directed by: Wu Tianmao; Tian Ye
- Starring: Zhou Jieqiong; Li Chengbin
- Country of origin: China
- Original language: Chinese
- No. of seasons: 1
- No. of episodes: 36

Production
- Producer: Jin Qianfei
- Production location: China
- Running time: 45 minutes
- Production company: Xing Ge Entertainment

Original release
- Network: Youku
- Release: February 14, 2020

Miss Truth (simplified Chinese: 大唐女法医; traditional Chinese: 大唐女法醫; pinyin: Dàtáng Nǚ Fǎyī) is an original Chinese television series based on a novel of the same title starring Zhou Jieqiong and Li Chengbin. It is aired on Youku on February 14, 2020, for 36 episodes.

Miss Truth has a 4.3 rating on Douban from over 13,000 reviews.

== Synopsis ==
Miss Truth follows the story of forensic examiner Ran Yan, as she investigates the truth around her mother's suicide and solves murder cases one at a time. Ran Yan is an eighteen year old destitute noblewoman who grew up learning about autopsies and finding clues through corpses. She encounters a judicial official and an assassin by chance and finds true love through the course of searching for the truth.

== Cast ==
=== Main ===
- Zhou Jieqiong as Ran Yan (冉颜), a highly talented Forensic examiner who took only 3 years to learn all her master's skills.
- Li Chengbin as Xiao Song (萧颂), Assistant Minister in the Ministry of Punishment.
- Pei Zitian as Su Fu (苏伏), a top killer under the Huo Qi Organisation and Ran Yan's fiancé before they met in person.

=== Supporting ===
- Lan Bo as Sang Chen (桑辰), a teacher at the school. He is also a top Scholar and has a wide range of knowledge. His given name is Cui Chen (崔辰).
- Wang Yizhe as Bai Yi (白义), Xiao Song's right-hand man.
- Yuan Ziyun as Wan Lü (晚绿), Ran Yan's personal maid.
- Tu Hua as Ran Mei Yu (冉美玉), Ran Yan's half sister.
- Li Shuai as Minister Li
- Shi Liuyan as Princess Ba Ling (巴陵公主)

== Official soundtrack ==
Miss Truth: Original Soundtrack

Soundtrack album by various artists
- Released: February 14, 2020
- Recorded: 2020
- Genre: Soundtrack
- Language: Chinese
- Label: 众匠（北京）文化传媒有限公司; QQ Music

=== Miss Truth: Original Soundtrack ===
The following is the official track list of Miss Truth.

| No. | Title | Lyrics | Music | Artist | Length |
|---|---|---|---|---|---|
| 1. | "亿万星辰不如你" | 浅紫; 施翌 | 都智文 | Xiao Panpan; Liu Xin | 4:00 |
| 2. | "手心泪" | 徐昊 | 谢衣沛 | Kym | 4:18 |
| 3. | "天籁" | 浅紫; 张鹏鹏 | 浅紫 | Zhou Jieqiong | 4:52 |
| 4. | "小窃喜" | 浅紫 | 谢维 | Zhou Jieqiong | 3:45 |
| 5. | "物是情非" | 徐昊 | 都智文 | Zhu Xingdong | 4:29 |
| 6. | "白首" | 张鹏鹏 | 郑国锋 | Qian Zhenghao | 3:45 |
