= I Won't Get Bullied by Girls =

- Also known as: Chinese: 我才不会被女孩子欺负呢
- Genre: Romance comedy Teen
- Directed by: Chen Peng
- Starring: Cai Xukun; Lu Yangyang; Wang Xuan; Jiang Yu Wei; Yang Jingcheng; Wang Ziyue
- Country of origin: China
- Original language: Chinese
- No. of seasons: 1
- No. of episodes: 24

Production
- Producers: Yuan Yumei; Shang Na
- Production location: China
- Running time: 24 minutes

Original release
- Network: Youku
- Release: April 12 – May 3, 2018

I Won't Get Bullied by Girls (Chinese: 我才不会被女孩子欺负呢) is a Chinese romantic comedy teen TV series produced by Youku. The show was officially aired and streamed online on April 12, 2018 on Youku.

== Synopsis ==
During his youth, Ye Lin (Cai Xukun) was bullied by Ren Xiaoqin (Hanna Lu). Determined to not be bullied by any girl, Ye Lin worked very hard and grew into a fine young man. A few years later, Xiaoqin transferred to the same school as Ye Lin after she realized that she had a crush on him. However, Ye Lin is still terrified by what Ren Xiaoqin did in the past, resulting in him becoming a cold-hearted and indifferent man to Ren Xiaoqin, who tried to win his heart. However, Shusha (Jiang Yu Wei) and Amy (Wang Xuan) also like Ye Lin, and are Xiaoqin's rivals for Ye Lin's love.

Who will end up with Ye Lin in the end?

== Cast ==
Actor	Character	Introduction
Cai Xukun	Ye Lin	A hot-headed young man who was bullied mercilessly by Ren Xiaoqin when he was younger. He wanted to set up a Lion Dance Club which was his late brother's dream.
Lu Yangyang	Ren Xiaoqin	A transfer student at Ye Lin's school who realised that she loves him even though she bullied him in the past.
Wang Xuan	Amy	Ren Xiaoqin's rival for Ye Lin's love who is also a transfer student. She is a popular student who is known as an "idol".
Jiang Yu Wei	Shusha	Chairperson of the class who is also Amy's and Xiaoqin's rival for Ye Lin's love. She is righteous and always wants the best for Ye Lin.
Yang Jingcheng	Shuzhe	Shusha's brother who helps Ye Lin set up the Lion Dance Club
Wang Ziyue	Shen Shaoyi	A popular and rich boy who's Ye Lin's best friend, they have been through a lot together.
