= Be My Princess =

2022 Chinese television series

- Official Poster
- Genre: Romance
- Created by: iQiyi
- Based on: 影帝的公主 by Xiao Jiaren
- Written by: Zhai Yu; Fang Yide
- Directed by: Huang Tianren
- Starring: Jeremy Tsui; Zhou Jieqiong
- Country of origin: China
- Original language: Mandarin
- No. of episodes: 30

Production
- Running time: 45 mins
- Production companies: iQiyi; 青新文化

Original release
- Network: iQiyi; Mango TV
- Release: March 16 – April 13, 2022

Be My Princess (Chinese: 影帝的公主) is a 2022 Chinese romantic series based on the novel of the same name by Xiao Jiaren, starring Jeremy Tsui and Zhou Jieqiong. This an iQiyi original series which airs on iQiyi and Mango TV from March 16, 2022, and is also available on iQiyi app and iQ.com.

== Plot ==
Ming Wei (Zhou Jieqiong) is a part-time translator who loves acting. She was unexpectedly selected to be the female lead of award winning actor Mu Ting Zhou’s (Jeremy Tsui) upcoming drama. There she enacts the love story between a princess and a master in Ming Dynasty with Mu Ting Zhou. After an accident which caused Mu Ting Zhou to lose his memories, he only remembers Ming Wei who he protected dearly as the princess in the drama. In order to help Mu Ting Zhou recover his memories, Ming Wei starts taking care of his life.

== Cast ==
=== Main ===
- Jeremy Tsui as Mu Ting Zhou / Mu Yun
- Zhou Jieqiong as Ming Wei

=== Supporting ===
- Wu Jiayi as Ming Qiao (Ming Wei's sister)
- Hu Yunhao as Xiao Zhao / Xu Run (Ting Zhou's agent)
- Xu Ka Xin as Chen Zhang
- Li Ruo Ning as Xu Lin (Xiao Zhao's sister)
- Yang Si Tong as Shen Su
- Wan Tong as Wang Ying Ying
- Bai Fan as Mu Chong
- Zhang Han as Dou Jing
- Rong Rong as Jiang Yue
- Wang Li as Ming Qiang
- Ma Wei Jiang as Xu Xiu
- Qi Yi as Han Xiao Ya
- Fang Jing Yi as Liang Lu Lu

== Production ==
The series began filming in December 2020 in Shanghai, China and wrapped up on 30 March 2021.

== Official soundtrack ==
Be My Princess: Original Soundtrack

Soundtrack album by various artists
- Released: March 16, 2022
- Recorded: 2022
- Genre: Soundtrack
- Language: Chinese
- Label: Yum Music

=== Main theme ===
No.	Title	Lyrics	Music	Artist	Length
1.	"雪花叹"	瀟彬	徐雲霄	Ding Funi	4:31

=== Part 1 ===
No.	Title	Lyrics	Music	Artist	Length
1.	"I Feel You"	占逸君; 小A	孫艾藜	Duan Aojuan	4:08

=== Part 2 ===
No.	Title	Lyrics	Music	Artist	Length
1.	"Love Will Find A Way"	朱金泰; 印子月; 王宗宇; 瀟彬	何亮	董唧唧	3:17

=== Part 3 ===
No.	Title	Lyrics	Music	Artist	Length
1.	"Closer" (心贴近)	高瑩	高瑩	Zhou Jieqiong	3:57

=== Part 3 ===
No.	Title	Lyrics	Music	Artist	Length
1.	"By Your Side" (Chinese ver.)	印子月; 王宗宇	Jackpot Wave (Jay Hong, Keidy Ko, Jae-yeop Jeong)	Baby-J	4:01

=== Part 4 ===
No.	Title	Lyrics	Music	Artist	Length
1.	"By Your Side" (English ver.)	Jay Hong; 王宗宇	Jackpot Wave (Jay Hong, Keidy Ko, Jae-yeop Jeong)	Jay Hong	4:03

=== Part 5 ===
No.	Title	Lyrics	Music	Artist	Length
1.	"想你了"	梅真; 唐思淼; 吴跃鑫; 小白; 徐云霄; 林清让	徐云霄	He Ziling	3:36

=== Part 6 ===
No.	Title	Lyrics	Music	Artist	Length
1.	"不用抱歉"	胡寒	胡寒	覆予	4:09
