= Luna Yin =

Chinese C-pop singer songwriter (born 1993)

- Born: 印子月 (Yin Zi Yue); 30 July 1993 (age 32); Taixing, Jiangsu, China
- Occupation: singer-songwriter
- Years active: 2010–present

Chinese name
Transcriptions
Standard Mandarin
- Hanyu Pinyin: Yin Zi Yue
Yue: Cantonese
- Jyutping: Yan Ji Yut
Southern Min
- Hokkien POJ: Iǹ chú goa̍t
- Musical career
- Origin: China
- Genres: C-pop Mandopop, Cantopop
- Instruments: Vocals, guitar
- Label: GOGOMUSIC
- Website: Official weibo profile

Luna Yin (Chinese: 印子月; born 30 July 1993) is a Chinese C-pop (Mandopop) singer songwriter born in the city of Taixing, in the province of Jiangsu. She has released two EPs and one studio album. As a composer, she has created songs for other singers such as He Jie and Ada Zhuang amongst others.

== Biography ==
Yin was born in Taixing, Jiangsu Province on 30 June 1993. In 2010, when she was only a teenager, with the artistic name of Robot 5, she started her music career as an independent singer by singing covers and her own compositions in weibo and the QQ Music platform.

In 2012, two years after her start, she signed a contract with the company GOGOMUSIC, in which she took part both as a performer and as a singer. From then on, she started releasing her original songs, she kept on composing music and also participated in the compilation albums of her record label. She released songs both as a solo singer and also collaboration with other artists of her music company.

One year later, Yin released her first EP entitled "If you love me" that contained five songs. That same year, she composed for Ada Zhuang a song called "About that", which received a certain grade of media attention.

In 2014, the singer went on with her career as a singer and composer, she released new songs and a new EP, which also contained two songs and also an album with all her original songs composed before the start of the career inside the label GOGOMUSIC. The same year, the performer also collaborated with Miro, another female singer from her music company. With her, she released an EP with three songs called "Falling in love with a gay man".

In 2015, Yin released a new EP entitled "Simply you don't love me enough", which's title track was accompanied with a music video. As a result, this song had a much better reception than her previous music releases. That year, she also composed a track called "Borrowed" that was included in the soundtrack of the Hunan Television TV drama Tornado Girl and also participated as an actress in the comedy film "Teenager".

In the following years, the performer went on releasing new music for her releases, for films and for TV dramas. In 2017, she won an online song contest with the song "Ill be OK" and one year later, she released her first studio full-length album entitled "Trainee witch".

== Discography ==
=== Solo ===
==== Studio albums and EP's ====
- If you love me (EP) (2013)
- Monthly songs (Full album) (2014)
- Don't say that you miss me (Full album 2015)
- Simply you don't love me enough (EP) (2015)
- Trainee witch (Full album) (2018)

==== Singles ====
- Wind in the alley (2012)
- Wake up now (2012)
- Love song (2012)
- Love words (2013)
- Lonely city (2013)
- Naifei (2013)
- Sunny memories (2013)
- Just me (2013)
- Laughing beautiful girl (2013)
- To forget that you forgot it (2013)
- Simply you don't love me enough (2015)
- I'll be OK (2017)
- Time of a love song (2019)
- Wind's expectations (2019)
- Please Please!!! (2019)

=== Collaborations ===
- Falling in love with a gay man (EP) (2014)
- What's your sign? (EP) (2015)

=== As a songwriter ===
- Everybody can have a good time (Performed by Tong Keke)
- Dolly baby (Performed by Tong Keke)
- Closed shy flower (Performed by Wang Ruiqi)
- About that (Performed by Ada Zhuang)
- Absence (Performed by Tong Keke)
- Make up (Performed by Tong Keke)
- Not even a single word (Performed by Tong Keke)
- Dream dream (Performed by Tong Keke)
- I owe my dreams (Performed by Tong Keke)
- Dancing under a sword (Performed by Tong Keke)
- Youth on fire (Performed by He Jie)
- Most precious secret (Performed by Xu Hao)
- Have you ever thought? (Performed by Xu Hao)
- Flash as you (Performed by Jin Wenxin)
