= Zhou Jieqiong =

Chinese singer and actress (born 1998)

- 周洁琼
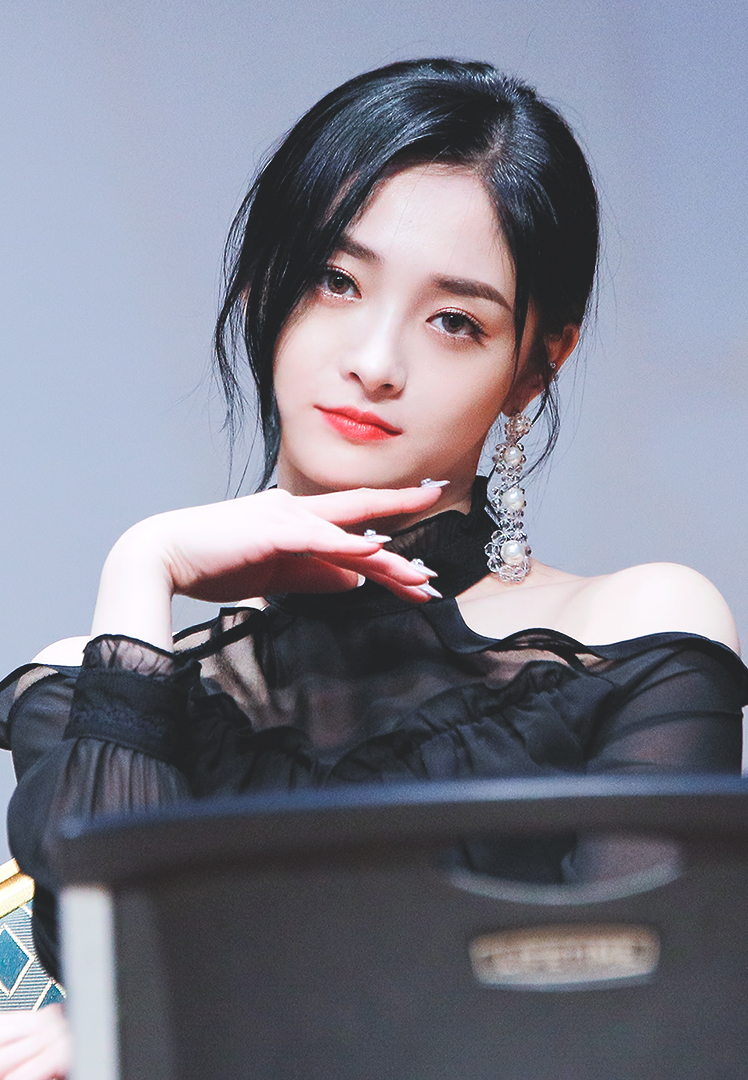
- Zhou in 2018
- Born: December 16, 1998 (age 27); Taizhou, Zhejiang, China
- Other names: Ju Kyul-kyung; Kyulkyung
- Education: School of Performing Arts Seoul
- Occupations: Singer; dancer; actress
- Musical career
- Origin: South Korea
- Genres: K-pop; C-pop
- Instruments: Vocals; pipa
- Years active: 2016–present
- Labels: Pledis; YMC (Note: As a member of I.O.I only.); XCSS; Swing; Studio Blu; Zhou Jieqiong Studio
- Formerly of: I.O.I; I.O.I sub-unit; Pristin; Pristin V

Chinese name
- Traditional Chinese: 周潔瓊
- Simplified Chinese: 周洁琼
- Hanyu Pinyin: Zhōu Jiéqióng
- Wade–Giles: Chou¹ Chieh²-chʻiung²

Korean name
- Hangul: 주결경
- RR: Ju Gyeolgyeong
- MR: Chu Kyŏlgyŏng

Zhou Jieqiong (Chinese: 周洁琼; Korean: 주결경; born December 16, 1998), known professionally as Jieqiong or Kyulkyung (in Korean), is a Chinese singer and actress. She is best known as a member of the girl group I.O.I after finishing sixth in the survival show Produce 101. She also became a member of Pristin and its subgroup Pristin V. She made her solo debut with the single "Why" on September 6, 2018.

As an actress, she is best known for her roles in Miss Truth (2020), Legend of Fei (2020), To Be With You (2021), Be My Princess (2022), and Romance in the Alley (2024).

== Early life and education ==
Zhou was born on December 16, 1998, in Taizhou, Zhejiang, China. She attended the Music Middle School Affiliated to Shanghai Conservatory of Music, where she specialized in the pipa. In 2009, she was discovered by Pledis Entertainment scouts in Shanghai, and moved to South Korea. In 2017, she graduated with a performing arts degree from the School of Performing Arts Seoul.

== Career ==
=== 2016–2017: Produce 101, I.O.I, and Pledis Girlz ===
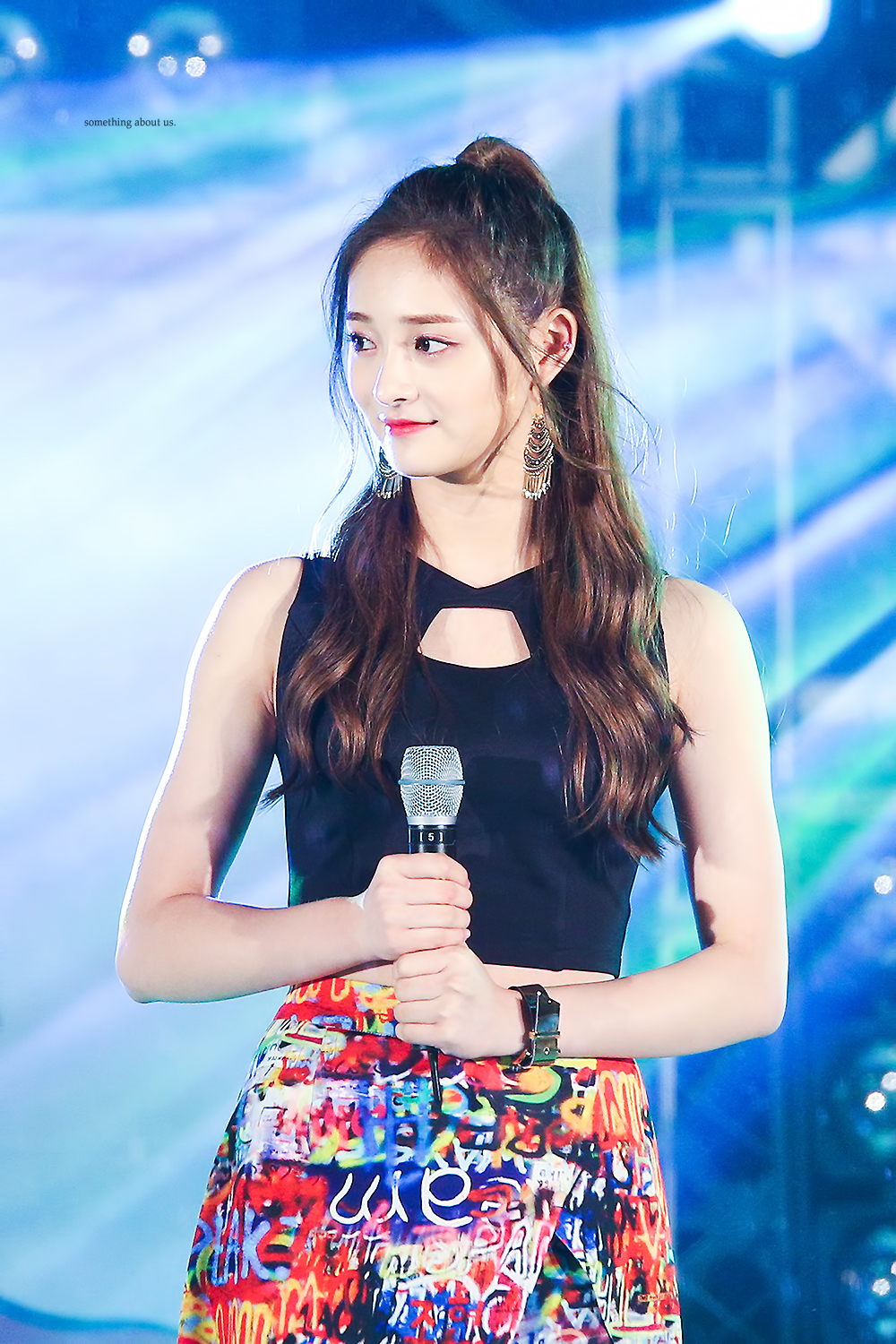
Zhou on October 7, 2016

Zhou participated in Mnet's survival television show, Produce 101, which aired from January 22 to April 1, 2016. Five of the participants from Pledis Entertainment were eliminated and only Zhou and Lim Na-young became part of the final line-up for the girl group I.O.I. Zhou ranked sixth with an overall of 218,338 votes. I.O.I made their debut on May 4 with the single, "Dream Girls".

Concurrently, Zhou and Lim promoted as a member of Pledis Girlz, appearing at certain weekly concerts in 2016. On January 6, 2017, Zhou appeared with the other nine members of Pledis Girlz at their final concert, titled Bye & Hi. At this concert, they revealed that they would debut with the name Pristin.

=== 2017: Debut with Pristin ===
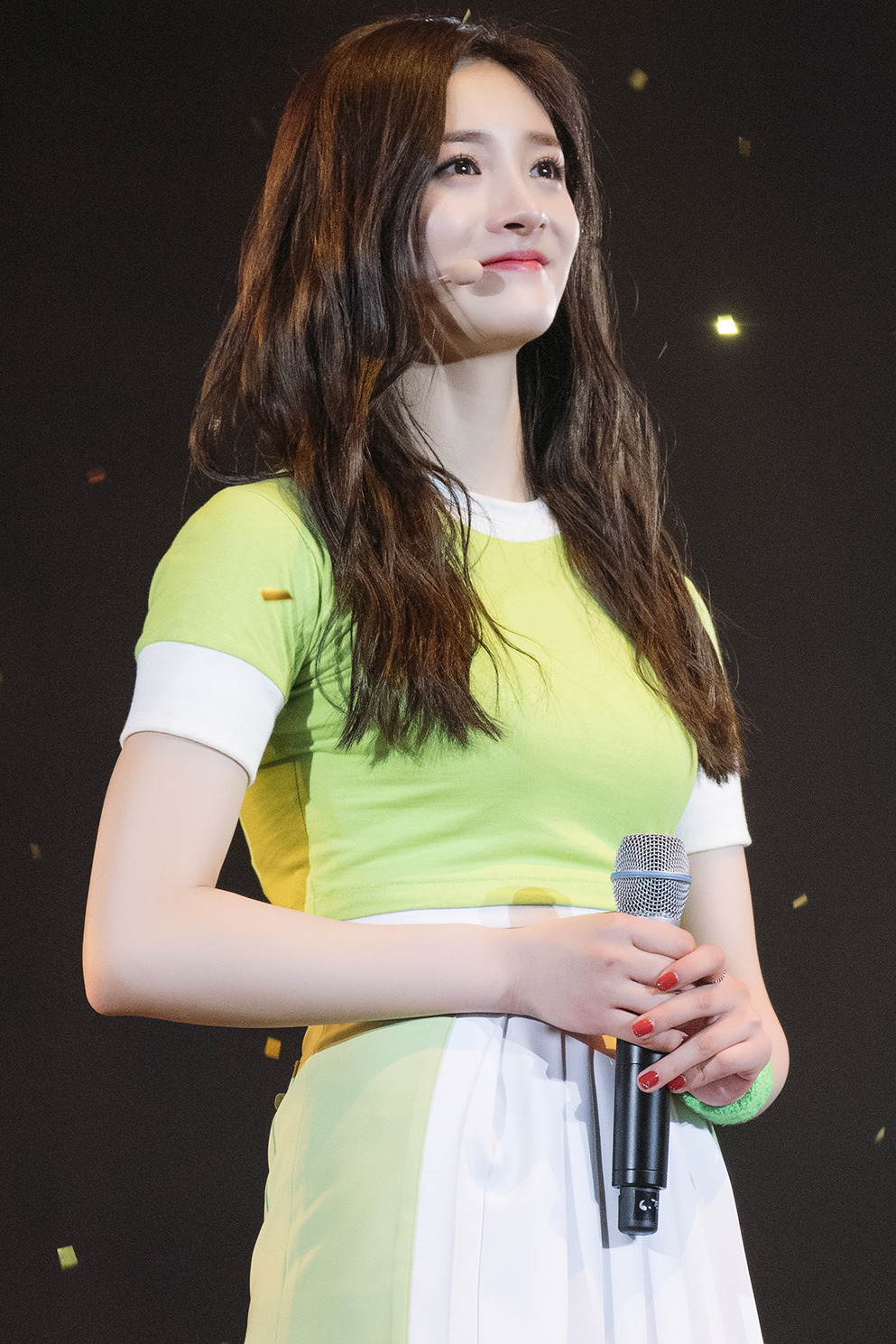
Zhou on January 21, 2017

After the disbandment of I.O.I, Zhou and Lim Na-young debuted with Pledis Entertainment's Pristin on March 21, 2017. Pristin officially debuted and released their first mini album, Hi! Pristin, accompanied by the title track, "Wee Woo".

=== 2018–present: Pristin V and solo career ===
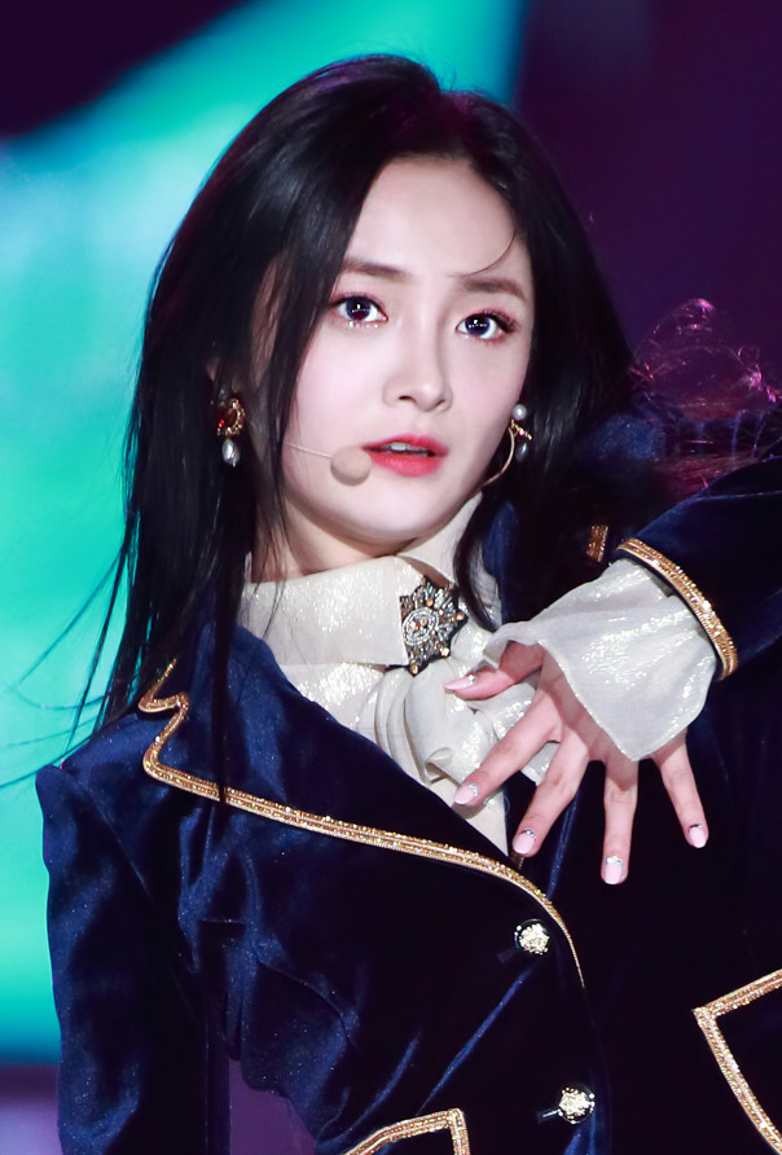
Zhou at Seoul Music Awards, January 2018

In January 2018, Zhou joined as a dance mentor in the reality survival show, Idol Producer. In May, a Pristin subgroup named Pristin V was formed with Zhou and members Nayoung, Roa, Eunwoo, and Rena. They debuted on May 28, 2018, with the single album, Like a V. Zhou released a soundtrack for the television show I Got You, titled "Leave It to Brother". On August 31, Pledis Entertainment confirmed that Zhou would be making her solo debut in China with digital single, "Why", on September 6. She then had her solo debut stage the day after the song's release on iQiyi's Idol Hits. Zhou also made several television soundtrack appearances in Hi! Housemate and Love Timing with the singles "Hi! Housemate" and "有你有我" respectively. In October, it was confirmed that Zhou would make her acting debut in the historical mystery drama Miss Truth. On May 24, 2019, Pristin was officially disbanded. Pledis Entertainment announced that Zhou would be staying with the label.

On February 14, 2020, after the premier of Miss Truth, Zhou released the OST for the show, "小窃喜" and "天籁". Zhou starred in the Chinese wuxia television series Legend of Fei in 2020. Zhou also played the main role in To Be With You released on February 15, 2021.

On May 4, 2021, Zhou and the members of I.O.I celebrated their 5th debut anniversary with a reunion live stream show called "Yes, I Love It!". Although Zhou was not in Korea, she made an appearance by video calling the members of I.O.I from China.

Zhou starred in iQIYI and Mango TV's romance drama Be My Princess aired on March 16, 2022.

== Discography ==
=== Singles ===
| Title | Year | Peak chart position | | Album |
| Title | Year | CHN | TWN | Album |
|---|---|---|---|---|
| "Get It" (Chinese version) (Note: "Get It" (Chinese version) was a Chinese version of Pristin V's "Get It" from its debut single album Like a V.) | 2018 | — | — | Non-album single |
| "Why" | 2018 | 64 | 38 | Why |
"—" denotes releases that did not chart or were not released in that region.

=== Soundtrack appearances ===
| Title | Year | Peak chart position | | Album |
| Title | Year | CHN | TWN | Album |
|---|---|---|---|---|
| "Leave It to Brother" (交给哥哥吧) | 2018 | — | — | I Got You OST |
| "Hi! Housemate" (Hi室友) (with Hi! Housemate casts) | 2018 | — | — | Hi! Housemate OST |
| "Writing Poems for You" (为你写诗) (with Silence Wang) | 2018 | 16 | — | Crazy Little Things OST Part 3 |
| "看你看我" (with Wang Ziyi) | 2019 | — | — | Yes, I Do OST |
| "小窃喜" | 2020 | — | — | Miss Truth OST Part 3 |
| "天籁" | 2020 | — | — | Miss Truth OST Part 4 |
| "再次和我起舞吧" (with Sunny Sisters casts) | 2021 | — | — | Sunny Sisters OST Part 1 |
| "VVS" (with Stage Boom casts) | 2021 | 68 | — | Stage Boom OST |
| "Forever Young" (with The Flash Band casts) | 2021 | — | — | The Flash Band OST |
| "Closer" (心贴近) | 2022 | — | — | Be My Princess OST Part 3 |
| "你在左心在右" (with Qin Xiaoxian) | 2022 | — | — | Yes, I Do Season 3 OST |
"—" denotes releases that did not chart or were not released in that region.

=== Songwriting credits ===
| Title | Year | Album | Lyrics | | Music | | Arrangement | |
| Title | Year | Album | Credited | With | Credited | With | Credited | With |
|---|---|---|---|---|---|---|---|---|
| "Over n Over" | 2017 | Hi! Pristin | Yes | Eunwoo, Sungyeon, Yuha, Xiyeon, Kyla | No | —N/a | No | —N/a |
| "Why" | 2018 | Why | Yes | Tina Wang | No | —N/a | No | —N/a |
| "Glass Shoes (MAMA Ver.)" | 2018 | To. Heart | No | —N/a | Yes | Anchor, Sophiya, Yuha, Joe Michel | No | —N/a |

== Filmography ==
=== Film ===
| Year | Title | Chinese title | Role | Ref. |
|---|---|---|---|---|
| 2021 | Sunny Sisters | 阳光姐妹淘 | Li Youran | |

=== Television series ===
| Year | Title | Chinese title | Role | Ref. |
|---|---|---|---|---|
| 2024 | Romance in the Alley | 小巷人家 | Wu Shanshan | |

=== Web series ===
| Year | Title | Chinese title | Role | Ref. |
|---|---|---|---|---|
| 2020 | Miss Truth | 大唐女法医 | Ran Yan | |
| 2020 | Legend of Fei | 有翡 | Li Yan | |
| 2021 | To Be With You | 约定 | Li Xiaorong | |
| 2022 | Be My Princess | 影帝的公主 | Ming Wei | |
| 2024 | Their Wonderful Times | 他们的奇妙时光 | Song Lingling | |
| 2024 | Brocade Odyssey | 蜀锦人家 | Ning Dai | |
| 2025 | Love in Pavilion | 淮水竹亭 | Cuiyu Mingluan | |
| 2025 | Feud | 临江仙 | Qu Xingman | |
| 2025 | A Forbidden Marriage | 明月入卿怀 | Yang Wangyue | |
| 2025 | Fight For Love | 山河枕 | Chu Jin | |
| 2026 | Rebirth | 冰湖重生 | Lady Yun | |
| 2026 | The Lament of Autumn | 玉簟秋 | Lan Qing | |
| TBA | Blade of Vengeance | 白衣公卿 | Mei Hong | |
| TBA | Us in Wonderland | 明日乐园 | Xiao Cheng | |
| TBA | Not Yielding The Kingdom | 不让江山 | Gao Xining | |
| TBA | The Awakening | 四十七 | Qi Jun | |
| TBA | A Panorama of Rivers and Mountains | 千里江山图 | Xiao Feng Huang / Little Phoenix | |
| TBA | Xing Jing Shi Ke 1: Feng Hua Zheng Mao | 刑警时刻1风华正茂 | Lin Jiayan | |

=== Television shows ===
| Year | Title | Role | Notes | Ref. |
|---|---|---|---|---|
| 2016 | Produce 101 | Contestant | Survival show that determined I.O.I members Finished 6th | |
| 2017 | Oppa Thinking | Intern | | |
| 2017 | Crazy Wardrobe (疯狂衣橱) | Cast member | | |
| 2018 | Idol Producer | Dance mentor | | |
| 2018 | Hi! Housemate (Hi室友) | Cast member | | |
| 2019 | Yes, I Do (喜欢你, 我也是) | Cast member | | |
| 2020 | King of Masked Dancer (蒙面舞王) | Contestant | | |
| 2021 | Stage Boom | Contestant | | |
| 2021 | The Flash Band (闪光的乐队) | Cast member | | |
| 2022 | Yes, I Do Season 3 (喜欢你我也是 第三季) | Cast member | | |
