= Oppa Thinking =

- Also known as: Thinking About Oppa; Thinking About My Bias; Oppa Saeng-gag; Make Me Viral
- Genre: Reality television
- Created by: Choi Won-suk
- Written by: Pyo Ji-yun, Lee Ji-eun, Kwon Min-hui, Im Yeon-ju, Min Jeong-i, Bak Sun-hui, Lee Seong-hui, Kyeong Ji-won
- Directed by: Oh Mi-kyeong
- Country of origin: South Korea
- Original language: Korean
- No. of seasons: 1
- No. of episodes: 16+ 2 pilot

Production
- Production location: South Korea
- Camera setup: Multi-camera
- Running time: 85 minutes
- Production company: MBC Variety Unit

Original release
- Network: MBC
- Release: May 20 – September 11, 2017

Oppa Thinking (Korean: 오빠생각; RR: Oppasaenggak) is a South Korean television entertainment program, distributed and syndicated by MBC every Monday at 23:10 (KST).

== Content ==
Celebrities make promotional videos of themselves, produced by one of the teams, and upload them on social media to appeal to the public. The next episode, they announce the winner based on the number of new fans.

== Cast members ==
=== Team 1 ===
| Name | Role |
|---|---|
| Tak Jae-hoon | Leader |
| Eunhyuk (Super Junior) | |
| Lee Guk-joo | |

=== Team 2 ===
| Name | Role |
|---|---|
| Lee Sang-min | Leader |
| Heo Kyung-hwan | |
| Lee Kyu-han | |

=== Interns ===
- Zhou Jieqiong – 4–9
- Park Na-rae – Episode 7
- Cao Lu – Episode 10–13

=== Former members ===
- Cha Eun-woo – Pilot
- Kyungri – Pilot
- Yang Se-hyung – Pilot
- Yang Se-chan – Pilot
- Joy – Pilot
- Lee Mal-nyeon – Pilot, Episode 1–3
- Lee Sang-jun – Pilot, Episode 1–3
- Kangnam – Episode 1–3
- Yoo Se-yoon – Pilot, Episode 1–10
- Solbi – Pilot, Episode 1–13
- Lee Hong-gi (F.T. Island) – Episode 11–13

== Guests ==
| Episode # | Guests | | Teams | Winning team | Notes |
|---|---|---|---|---|---|
| Pilot | Yoon Kyun-sang | | Team 1 | N/A | Interns Joy (Red Velvet), Park Gyeong-ree (Nine Muses) and Cha Eunwoo (Astro) |
| Pilot | Chae Soo-bin | | Team 2 | N/A | Interns Joy (Red Velvet), Park Gyeong-ree (Nine Muses) and Cha Eunwoo (Astro) |
| 1 | Winner | Seungyoon, Seunghoon | Team 1 | Team 2 | |
| 1 | Winner | Mino, Jinwoo | Team 2 | Team 2 | |
| 2 | Twice | | Both teams | Both teams | Contests are individual; participants not ranked |
| 3 | Henry | | Team 1 | Team 1 | Last episode for Kangnam (M.I.B), Lee Mal-nyeon and Lee Sang-jun |
| 3 | Sleepy | | Team 2 | Team 1 | Last episode for Kangnam (M.I.B), Lee Mal-nyeon and Lee Sang-jun |
| 4 | SECHSKIES | | Both teams | Both teams | Intern Kyulkyung (Pristin, I.O.I) Parody of Produce 101 Season 2 |
| 5 | Akdong Musician | | | Both Teams | Intern Kyulkyung (Pristin, I.O.I) Street performance collaboration |
| 5 | Sul Woon-do | | | Both Teams | Intern Kyulkyung (Pristin, I.O.I) Street performance collaboration |
| 6 | Shoo (S.E.S) | | | Both Teams | Intern Kyulkyung (Pristin, I.O.I) Artists collaborate to perform "A Lovely Night" from La La Land |
| 6 | Won Ki-joon | | | Both Teams | Intern Kyulkyung (Pristin, I.O.I) Artists collaborate to perform "A Lovely Night" from La La Land |
| 7 | Lee Hong-gi, Choi Jong-hoon (F.T. Island) | | | Hong Jin-young | Interns Kyulkyung (Pristin, I.O.I), Park Na-rae Teams prepare food carts and compete for sales in MBC building |
| 7 | Hong Jin-young | | | Hong Jin-young | Interns Kyulkyung (Pristin, I.O.I), Park Na-rae Teams prepare food carts and compete for sales in MBC building |
| 8 | UV x Shindong | | | | Intern Kyulkyung (Pristin, I.O.I) UV x Shindong wedding congratulations video Seo Min-jung cooking segment for My Little Television |
| 8 | Seo Min-jung | | | | Intern Kyulkyung (Pristin, I.O.I) UV x Shindong wedding congratulations video Seo Min-jung cooking segment for My Little Television |
| 9 | Bobby, B.I, Ju-ne (iKon) | | | iKon | Intern Kyulkyung (Pristin, I.O.I) Haunted house concept |
| 9 | DinDin | | | iKon | Intern Kyulkyung (Pristin, I.O.I) Haunted house concept |
| 10 | Park Joon-hyung | | | | Intern Cao Lu (Fiestar) Video messages for future daughters and sons-in-law |
| 10 | Kim Won-jun | | | | Intern Cao Lu (Fiestar) Video messages for future daughters and sons-in-law |
| 11 | Red Velvet | | | | Intern Cao Lu (Fiestar) Irene made a commercial for soju, Yeri did a cover of the opening from the anime Full Moon o Sagashite, Wendy did a cover of Fly by Nicki Minaj, Seulgi did a cover of The dance in rhythm by Kim Wan-sun and Joy did a cover of I only know love by Sim Soo-bong |
| 12 | Eunkwang, Yook Sungjae (BtoB) | | | | Intern Cao Lu (Fiestar) BtoB costume show and duet of "A Goose's Dream" Park Si-yeon plans prank |
| 12 | Park Si-yeon | | | | Intern Cao Lu (Fiestar) BtoB costume show and duet of "A Goose's Dream" Park Si-yeon plans prank |
| 13 | Kim Soo-ro | | | | Intern Cao Lu (Fiestar) |
| 13 | Lim Seul-ong, Jeong Jinwoon (2AM) | | | | Intern Cao Lu (Fiestar) |
| 14 | Lee Sun-bin | | | | |
| 14 | Kim Joon-ho | | | | |
| 15 | Kim Heung-gook | | | | |
| 15 | Taeyang (Big Bang) | | | | |
| 16 | Kim Jae-hwan, Park Ji-hoon, Lee Dae-hwi, Kang Daniel, Hwang Min-hyun (Wanna One) | | | | |

== Ratings ==
=== 2017 ===
In the ratings below, the highest rating for the show will be in red, and the lowest rating for the show will be in blue each year.

| Episode # | Broadcast Date | AGB Ratings | TNMS Ratings |
| Episode # | Broadcast Date | Nationwide | Nationwide |
|---|---|---|---|
| Pilot | January 30 | 2.8% | 3.3% |
| 1 | May 20 | 2.5% | 2.8% |
| 2 | May 27 | 2.4% | 2.3% |
| 3 | June 3 | 3.4% | 2.2% |
| 4 | June 10 | 2.8% | N/A |
| 5 | June 17 | 3.5% | N/A |
| 6 | June 24 | 2.7% | 2.5% |
| 7 | July 1 | 4.2% | 3.8% |
| 8 | July 8 | 3.6% | 2.6% |
| 9 | July 15 | 2.1% | 2.5% |
| 10 | July 22 | 2.4% | 2.5% |
Time slot changed from 16:55 to 23:10
| 11 | July 31 | 1.8% | 1.9% |
| 12 | August 7 | 1.4% | 1.6% |
| 13 | August 14 | 1.0% | 1.5% |
| 14 | August 21 | 1.2% | 1.5% |
| 15 | August 28 | 2.0% | 1.5% |
| 16 | September 11 | 1.5% | 2.0% |
