= Lock Me Up, Tie Him Down =

2014 film

- Film poster
- Directed by: Jeffrey Lau
- Written by: Jeffrey Lau; Guo Xiong
- Produced by: Jessica Kam
- Starring: He Jiong; Vivian Hsu; Wang Xuebing; Jiang Mengjie; Kara Hui; Frankie Chan
- Cinematography: Sam Koa
- Music by: Chiu Tsang-Hei; Andy Cheung Yan-Kit; Marco Mak
- Release date: 4 March 2014
- Running time: 94 minutes
- Country: China
- Language: Mandarin
- Box office: US$4.6 million

Lock Me Up, Tie Him Down (Chinese: 完美假妻168) is a 2014 Chinese film directed by Jeffrey Lau.

== Cast ==
- He Jiong
- Vivian Hsu
- Wang Xuebing
- Jiang Mengjie
- Kara Hui
- Frankie Chan
- Cai Xukun

== Reception ==
The film grossed US$4.6 million in China.
