= Ada Zhuang =

Chinese singer

- Born: 莊心妍 / 庄心妍 / Zhuāng xīn yán 9 January 1993 (age 33); Lufeng, Guangdong, China
- Occupation: singer-songwriter
- Years active: 2007–present

Chinese name
Transcriptions
Standard Mandarin
- Hanyu Pinyin: Zhuāng Xīnyán
Yue: Cantonese
- Jyutping: Zong1 Sam1 Jin4
- Musical career
- Origin: China
- Genres: C-pop (both Mandopop, Cantopop and Hokkien pop), C-rock
- Instruments: Vocals, Guitar
- Labels: Zhili Music, Ocean Butterflies
- Website: Official weibo

Ada Zhuang (simplified Chinese: 庄心妍; traditional Chinese: 莊心妍; pinyin: Zhuāng xīn yán) (born 9 January 1993) is a Chinese C-pop singer who started her music career in 2012. Since then, she has been gaining popularity in mainland China and her albums have also been released in Taiwan and Hong Kong.

== Personal life ==
Ada Zhuang was born on January 9, 1993, in Lufeng, in the Guangdong province of China. She lived her childhood and teenage in her hometown with her family.

When she was only 11 years old, in 2004, she started being interested in music after seeing the first edition of the Super Girl contest produced by Hunan TV. During the programme, her favourite contestant of the show was An Youqi, of whom she considers a fan. An Youquí, the very first winner of the programme would also turn into the most important musical influence of Zhuang, who started singing her songs.

From 2007 Ada Zhuang with the help of her sister started taking part in music competitions in which she performed covers of famous Cantopop songs. She also participated in a singing competition in a mall of her city. Although her first step in music was covering songs of famous singers, she started composing her own music some months later.

Determined to pursue a musical career, Zhuang opened her own QQ Music account in which she posted both her covers of cantonese hit songs, and her own original songs. Thanks to that music platform, she started meeting other singers, musicians and composers who shared the same interest in music. Thanks to her songs, she gained some popularity with an increasing fanbase.

== Music career ==
In 2012, Ada Zhuang signed a contract with Zhili Music, a Guangzhou based record label. One year later she released her first full album entitled "Ten thousand regrets" (一萬個捨不得). The album, which featured 12 songs (11 in Mandarin and one in Cantonese), was released on March 15 of 2013. The title song was the most successful one of the album, which had a moderate success in general. Since her debut, she started releasing 2 albums per year.

In 2014, after having released four albums, she published her fifth solo work entitled "Compassion" (好可惜), which turned, so far, into one of the most successful of her career thanks to the single "Two people remember one person" (兩個人的回憶一個人過) a song that made her popular outside mainland China and which also accumulates more than 10 million plays in YouTube. Since then, Ada Zhuang's albums started being also promoted by Ocean butterflies to the Taiwan, Hong Kong and the overseas Chinese community. As usual, her albums during that period included some songs in Cantonese and in Hokkien dialects.

The career of Zhuang continued its rise by participating in many concerts and events. In 2015, the young singer hold her very first solo concert in the Shenyang indoor stadium. One year later, after releasing her 9th album entitled "I do my best" (做最好的我), she held another successful concert in the Shijazhuang indoor stadium which was also mentioned by the local and national press.

In 2018, Zhuang signed under the Beijing-based label Horgos Xingtong Space Culture Media, where she released her eleventh album and her following single releases.

In 2021, Zhuang returned to her former music label, Zhili Music, where she released her album "Sixth sense".

== Discography ==
=== Studio albums ===
- Ten thousand regrets (一萬個捨不得) (2013)
- I've been thinking (一直想著他) (2013)
- Crossroad songs (錯愛情歌) (2014)
- I know (我知道) (2014)
- Compassion (好可惜) (2014)
- I don't want to decide (不想做決定) (2015)
- Leave me (放過自己) (2015)
- Maybe I'm waiting (我也許在等候) (2015)
- I do my best (做最好的我) (2016)
- I Choice between two options (精心妍选2无可取代) (2016)
- How good is love (爱能有多好) (2018)
- Thorough(徹底)(2019)
- Ada song (2020)
- Sixth sense (2021)

=== Singles ===
- Heart and soul
- Ten thousand regrets (一万个舍不得)
- It's not really easy (真的不容易)
- Prisoners of love (爱囚)
- Two people remember one person (兩個人的回憶一個人過)
- Some flowers bloom and others shatter (花開等花謝 Hokkien version of "Two people remember one person")
- Stardom (繁星点点)
- I can't stand any longer (时间长了受不了)
- Visionary (幻想家)
- Love in stock (填密爱)
- You are my treasure (你是我宝)
- Love pieces (爱的筹码)
- Distrust (多么舍不得)
- Say goodbye (说再见就好)
- Goodbye is just a stranger(再見只是陌生人)
- Every single minute (分分钟)
- Air liner (客机)
- Never happier than before (没有从前快乐)
- Bitter love (苦恋)
