= The Sorcerer and the White Snake =

- Film poster

Chinese name
- Traditional Chinese: 白蛇傳說之法海
- Simplified Chinese: 白蛇传说之法海
Transcriptions
Standard Mandarin
- Hanyu Pinyin: Bái Shé Chuán Shuō Zhī Fǎ Hǎi
Yue: Cantonese
- Jyutping: Baak6 Se4 Cyun4 Syut3 Zi1 Faat3 Hoi2
- Directed by: Ching Siu-tung
- Written by: Charcoal Tan; Tsang Kan-cheung; Szeto Cheuk-hon
- Based on: Legend of the White Snake
- Produced by: Po-chu Chui; Yang Zi
- Starring: Jet Li; Eva Huang; Raymond Lam; Charlene Choi; Wen Zhang; Vivian Hsu
- Cinematography: Venus Keung
- Edited by: Angie Lam
- Music by: Mark Lui
- Production company: China Juli Entertainment Media
- Distributed by: Distribution Workshop Aeon Pix Studios (India)
- Release dates: 3 September 2011 (Venice Film Festival); 28 September 2011 (China); 29 September 2011 (Hong Kong)
- Running time: 102 minutes
- Countries: China; Hong Kong
- Languages: Mandarin; Cantonese
- Budget: HK$200 million
- Box office: US$32,172,621 (worldwide)

The Sorcerer and the White Snake, previously known as It's Love and Madame White Snake, is a 2011 action fantasy film directed by Ching Siu-tung and starring Jet Li. It is based on the Chinese legend, Legend of the White Snake. The film was filmed in 3-D and was shown out of competition at the 68th Venice International Film Festival on 3 September 2011. It was released in mainland China on 28 September 2011 and in Hong Kong on 29 September.

== Plot ==
Abbot Fahai and his assistant Neng Ren meet an ice harpy at the top of a mountain. The harpy turned Neng Ren into an ice statue. Fahai is forced to capture her with a demon trapper, releasing Neng Ren from the transformation. Neng Ren is tasked to confine the ice harpy at Lei Feng Pagoda, in a magic circle along with other trapped demons.

On the other side of the mountain, two female snake demons (Qingqing and Susu) spot a physician, Xu Xian, picking herbs. Qingqing scares him, causing him to fall into the lake. Susu assumes human form and kisses Xu Xian, allowing Vital Essence to flow from her into his body, saving him.

After finding a victim of a bat demon, Fahai and Neng Ren leave the temple to subdue it. Xu Xian comes across them and offers a boat ride to the city. Susu starts thinking about the day she kissed Xu Xian and heads to the city to find him. While Qingqing is exploring the city, she comes across Neng Ren and decides to help him subdue the bat demon by revealing its location. Neng Ren defeats the bat demon's cohorts, but is unable to subdue the bat demon king and is bitten. Though saved by Fahai, Neng Ren starts turning into a bat demon and decides to run away. Meanwhile, Xu Xian recognises Susu. They spend the night together, but he is unaware she is a snake in human form.

Qingqing finds Zheng Ren and the two befriend each other. They realize that Neng Ren, despite becoming a bat demon, still has all his human taste for human food, and most of his human qualities. Meanwhile, Xu Xian and Susu wed. Fahai gives Xu Xian a dagger that can kill demons. Suspecting that Susu is a demon, Fahai confronts and defeats her. He spares her as she had helped save others but warns her to leave Xu Xi threatening to kill her otherwise. When she doesn't, Fahai and his disciples attack her and Xu Xian's cottage. Susu fights the battle in snake form, but is stabbed by Xu Xian, who is unaware of her true identity. Susu escapes but is gravely injured. Xu Xian, after realizing what he has done, decides to get the spirit root to heal her.

Helped by Susu's friend, a mouse, Xu Xian manages to retrieve a root kept inside the Lei Feng Pagoda, but is possessed by demons since the root was the thing that kept the demons in place. Fahai and the other monks capture Xu Xian and prepare to cast spells to banish the demons from his body. When Susu recovers, she goes to find Xu Xian along with Qingqing. They are confronted by Fahai, who tries to explain to them that the spell should not be broken before it is complete. Susu, however, does not believe him and accuses him of trying to separate them. The two sisters battle Fahai and after Fahai breaks their swords, they retaliate by unleashing a tidal wave on Jinshan. Susu releases Xu Xian from the spell, but he has no memory of Susu. Susu blames Fahai and they battle. Despite managing to repel Susu's fierce snakes and incapacitate Qingqing, Fahai is left defeated. He questions whether he was too driven on his demon-hunting and fierce defense of Buddha. When Susu recommences the battle, Fahai, empowered by his faith in Buddha, is able to trap Susu in Lei Feng Pagoda. At this point, Susu repents and asks to see Xu Xian just one last time. Fahai lifts the pagoda, temporarily freeing Susu. After an emotional talk with Xu Xian, Susu kisses him, causing him to remember everything. Susu is then sucked back into the temple, much to Xu Xian's sadness. Qingqing, watching from a distance with Neng Ren, tells him she doesn't want to love anyone as her sister loved Xu Xian, and leaves saying he will never be a true bat demon anyway.

In the epilogue, Xu Xian picks herbs around the pagoda, while Susu, returned to her snake form, is trapped inside the temple. Fahai is walking around the mountainside, when suddenly Neng Ren (now a complete bat demon) appears alongside him. Throwing him an apple, Fahai tells him that he has grown used to his new look, and they journey together again.

== Cast ==
- Jet Li as Abbot Fahai
- Raymond Lam as Xu Xian
- Eva Huang as the White Snake/Susu (素素)
- Charlene Choi as the Green Snake/Qingqing (小青)
- Wen Zhang as Neng Ren (能忍)
- Jiang Wu as Turtle Devil (龜妖)
- Vivian Hsu as Ice Harpy (雪妖)
- Miriam Yeung as Rabbit Devil (兔)
- Chapman To as Toad Monster/Gugu (蛤蟆怪)
- Law Kar-ying as Mysterious Herbalist (神秘藥師)
- Lam Suet as Chicken Devil (雞妖)
- Sonija Kwok as Bu Ming (不明)
- Angela Tong as Cat Devil (貓妖)
- Michelle Wai as Bat Devil (蝙蝠妖女)

== Production ==
Ethan Juan, Peter Ho, Mark Chao and Raymond Lam auditioned for the lead role of Xu Xian. In the end, Lam got the role. Juan and Chao were reportedly dropped as they were deemed to be not well-known enough in China and Ho's image did not suit the male lead.

Jet Li was announced as part of the cast during early pre-production. However, his role was not revealed until September 2010, when the filmmakers announced Jet Li as Fa Hai, Eva Huang as White Snake, Raymond Lam as Xu Xian, Charlene Choi as Green Snake and Wen Zhang, whom Li invited to play his disciple Neng Ren.

Regarding the action scenes, Jet Li said he had never been this exhausted before. Li said,

After fighting the White Snake, fight the Green Snake. After fighting the Green Snake, then fight the Demon. After fighting this Demon, then fight another Demon. After fighting this Demon, then fight the Water Monster. Everyday on set I was letting out a big sigh.

Raymond Lam said he was always being hit by others,

Especially Ah Sa, she even requested for the director to add fight scenes. As a result, added scenes to hit me! Furthermore she fought much more fiercely than before!

Filming wrapped on January 16, 2011. Originally titled Madame White Snake in English, the film logo was unveiled during the production wrap press conference with the new official English title, It's Love. However, the English title was changed to The Sorcerer and the White Snake when the distributor was announced. The actual title used was The Emperor and the White Snake, both on DVD and at IMDb.

== See also ==
- Hong Kong films of 2011
- Jet Li filmography
