= Green Snake (1993 film) =

1993 Hong Kong film by Tsui Hark

- Film poster
- Traditional Chinese: 青蛇
- Simplified Chinese: 青蛇
- Literal meaning: The Blue/Green Snake
Transcriptions
Standard Mandarin
- Hanyu Pinyin: Qīng Shé
Yue: Cantonese
- Jyutping: Cing¹ Se²
- Directed by: Tsui Hark
- Written by: Tsui Hark
- Based on: Green Snake by Lilian Lee
- Produced by: Tsui Hark; Benzheng Yu
- Starring: Maggie Cheung; Joey Wong; Vincent Zhao; Wu Hsing-kuo
- Cinematography: Ko Chiu-Lam
- Edited by: Ah Chik
- Music by: Mark Lui; James Wong Jim
- Production companies: Seasonal Film Corporation; Film Workshop
- Release date: November 4, 1993 (Hong Kong)
- Running time: 99 minutes
- Country: British Hong Kong
- Language: Cantonese

Green Snake is a 1993 Hong Kong fantasy drama film written, directed and produced by Tsui Hark. The film is based on the novel of the same title by Lilian Lee, itself based on the Chinese folk tale Legend of the White Snake, which depicts the love story between the female snake spirit Bai Suzhen, named White Snake in the film, and the male Human Xu Xian, named Hsui Xien in the film. Green Snake depicts the romance between the two, but features both White Snake and her sister Green Snake, originally a supporting character in the folk tale, as the two main characters.

In Green Snake, the two sisters take on a Human form to try to live among Humans; however, Green Snake struggles heavily to adapt, and the sisters are threatened by several demon-hunters, including the Buddhist monk Fat-hoi. Maggie Cheung, Joey Wong, Vincent Zhao and Wu Hsing-kuo star as the four aforementioned characters, with Indian actress Nagma notably featured in a pivotal scene.

== Plot ==
The movie draws heavily upon the Buddhist belief of Saṃsāra and the cycle of reincarnation. A Buddhist monk named Fat-hoi (Vincent Zhao) has trained for 20 years to banish demons from the Human World. Fat-hoi does not believe in non-human beings are capable of improving themselves spiritually. He encounters a spider demon who has taken the form of a Buddhist priest. He captures the spider demon, who pleads with him as it has been spiritually refining itself for 200 years to be able to reincarnate. Fat-hoi ignores his pleas, traps him in a magical cauldron, and leaves the demon under a gazebo. When the Buddhist beads of the demon continue to shine, Fat-hoi realizes he may have made a mistake in interfering with the Spider's path to enlightenment.

A storm takes place while Fat-hoi goes into the forest and he attacks two Snake spirits. But after he notices that they were only preventing rain from hitting a woman giving birth, he releases them. He is haunted by images of the female body of the mother who gave birth. The two snakes, White Snake (Joey Wong) and Green Snake (Maggie Cheung), are on the rooftop of a feast. Green Snake participates while White Snake sees local scholar Hsui Xien (Wu Hsing-Kuo) in a nearby building. The two have been training for many centuries to take human form. White Snake is the more experienced one and falls in love with Hsui Xien. She plans to have a family with him and continue her attempts to reincarnate as a human; Green Snake is the younger and more impulsive of the two sisters, but she is more prone to indulge in sensuality. They move into a house created with their magic and start a successful medical practice in town. Other than Hsui Xien's visit, the two get another visit from a buffoonish Taoist whom Green Snake leaves the household to take care of. Because of White Snake's beautiful charms, Hsui Xien, once known as the toughest and most dedicated scholar of the village, starts to lose his reputation.

In another heavy storm, a flood ravages the village. White Snake and Green Snake help vanquish the flood and are helped by Fat-hoi, whom they remembered from the forest. After the flood is gone, White Snake and Green Snake tend to the medical needs of the villagers and become greatly respected. However, Green Snake slowly starts to envy White Snake and yearn for the affections of a human, often using Hsui Xien as an experiment. Though she catches them multiple times, White Snake usually shrugs this off. One day while teaching, Hsui Xien spontaneously comes back to see White Snake but instead sees a large reptilian tail in their bathing room. He escapes and becomes paranoid of the symbolic snake-related objects in the village because of the Dragon Boat Festival. Drunk from gifts from the villagers, White Snake and Green Snake take advantage and lie to him to seem as if he was hallucinating.

Because the festival is near, White Snake pushes Green Snake to leave the village knowing that the Xionghuang wine consumed only on this day will make Green Snake reveal her true form (due to her inexperience). Green Snake sulks, refusing to leave because of her envy towards White Snake and Hsui Xien. The night of the festival, White Snake drags an obviously-scared Hsui Xien to drink the Xionghuang wine together. Since he already suspects his wife is a snake, Hsui Xien instead secretly dumps the wine into their pond to stop her from drinking it, unaware Green Snake is hiding in the pond. White Snake is unable to prevent Hsui Xien from seeing Green Snake's true form and he dies from shock. They are interrupted by the Taoist and his two apprentices again, who White Snake hastily disposes of. She decides to go to Kwun Lun Mountain to obtain the Lin-Chi Herb to bring him back to life, but because it is guarded by a Holy Crane, Green Snake decides to help out of guilt. Fat-hoi notices their presence and immediately follows them. After obtaining the Lin-Chi Herb, White Snake leaves Green Snake to fight against Fat-hoi but she is quickly defeated and is about to be captured in a cauldron. Meanwhile, White Snake restores Hsui Xien and they consummate their relationship.

Because of the doubts he has about human sensuality, the monk decides to challenge his inner strength by letting Green Snake try to seduce him while he meditates. When he loses the challenge, Green Snake quickly makes her way back to White Snake. Green Snake tells White Snake of Fat-hoi's challenge, but White Snake shrugs her off, leading Green Snake to assume that her older sister thinks she is inferior. To get a response out of White Snake, she attempts to seduce Hsui Xien. The two sisters get into a fight, which White Snake wins. She reveals to Green Snake that she is pregnant and cannot be with her anymore, causing Green Snake to leave.

Hsui Xien goes to his class to find Fat-hoi there. Fat-hoi warns him that the sisters are snake demons and gives him a set of enchanted beads to protect himself from evil spirits. Hsui Xien instead tosses the beads into the river. He arrives at home and pleads for the two to leave while he checks to see if Fat-hoi is near. He informs them that he is aware they are snake demons. The monk goes into their home and forcefully takes Hsui Xien into his Peaceful Land temple, situated atop an island peak, in order to "restore" him. Hsui Xien resists becoming a monk. White Snake appears at the temple and begs for the return of her husband. When Fat-hoi refuses, Green Snake joins White Snake and calls the monk on his promise to let them go if he lost the challenge. Green Snake creates a flood, attempting to flood the temple, but Fat-hoi lifts the entire temple into the air to prevent the catastrophe. When that fails, Fat-hoi tries to suffocate the two with his surplice but again, the two snakes were able to overcome it.

White Snake suddenly goes into labor and the flood advances towards the village. Fat-hoi recedes his surplice, thereby allowing Green Snake to enter the temple to retrieve Hsui Xien, who has accepted becoming a monk. White Snake struggles to keep her baby above water. Fat-hoi saves the baby, but White Snake is crushed by the temple, which was destroyed by the flood. Green Snake is able to rescue Hsui Xien from the temple. After she realizes White Snake is dead, she kills Hsui Xien so that he can be with her sister in the afterlife. Fat-hoi intends to punish her for her crime, but she forces him to acknowledge that he too was complicit in the death of his fellow monks, who died in the flood. Green Snake questions if even humans knows what love is and leaves, claiming she might one day return if humans ever figure out the answer. Fat-hoi stands alone with the baby.

== Cast ==
- Maggie Cheung - Green Snake
- Joey Wong - White Snake / Bai Sou Ching
- Vincent Zhao - Monk Fat-hoi
- Wu Hsing-kuo - Hsui Xien
- Chan Dung-Mooi
- Lau Kong - Blind Monk
- Nagma - Bharatanatyam dancer (as Najma)
- Tien Feng - Spider, Acrcha
- Ma Cheng-miu

== Reception ==
The Austin Chronicle gave the film 3.5 stars saying the film "beats the skin off Hark's half-dozen previous outings with a timeless and visually arresting story of love, loss, and airborne bald guys."
