= The White Snake Enchantress (film) =

- Theatrical poster
- Directed by: Taiji Yabushita
- Screenplay by: Taiji Yabushita
- Story by: Shin Uehara
- Based on: Legend of the White Snake
- Produced by: Hiroshi Ôkawa
- Starring: Hisaya Morishige; Mariko Miyagi
- Narrated by: Hisaya Morishige
- Cinematography: Takamitsu Tsukahara
- Edited by: Shinataro Miyamoto
- Music by: Chuji Kinoshita; Hajime Kaburagi; Masayoshi Ikeda
- Production company: Toei Doga
- Distributed by: Toei Company
- Release date: October 22, 1958
- Running time: 78 minutes
- Country: Japan
- Language: Japanese

The White Snake Enchantress (Japanese: 白蛇伝, Hepburn: Hakujaden; lit. 'Legend of the White Serpent') is a Japanese animated fantasy film. It is the first color anime feature film and Toei Animation's first theatrical feature film, released in 1958. It was one of the first three anime films to be released in America, under the title Panda and the Magic Serpent, premiering in 1961, a month after Magic Boy. It is an adaptation of the Chinese tale Legend of the White Snake and is also known as The Great White Snake and The Tale of the White Serpent. In April 2019, a restored version of the film was selected to be shown in the Cannes Classics section at the 2019 Cannes Film Festival.

== Plot ==
Xu Xian, a young boy, once owned a pet snake in West Lake until his parents forced him to give her up. Years pass and during a violent storm, the snake magically transforms into the beautiful princess Bai-Niang.

Bai-Niang finds Xu-Xian, but the lovers are separated by a local monk, Fa-Hai, who believes that Bai-Niang is an evil spirit. Xu Xian's two panda pets, Panda and Mimi, try to find Xu Xian. In the end, Bai-Niang gives up her magical powers and remains in human form to prove that her love for Xu Xian is genuine.

== Cast ==
| Character | Japanese voice actor | English dubbing actor |
|---|---|---|
| Xu Xian | Hisaya Morishige | George Matsui |
| Panda | Hisaya Morishige | Fernando Tejeda |
| Fahai | Hisaya Morishige | Mel Welles |
| Dragon King | Hisaya Morishige | Bob Neuman |
| Catfish King | Hisaya Morishige | Unknown |
| Narrator | Hisaya Morishige | Marvin Miller |
| Bai-Niang | Mariko Miyagi | Lisa Lu |
| Xiaoqing | Mariko Miyagi | Miiko Taka |
| Mimi | Mariko Miyagi | Virginia Blackman |
| Duck | Mariko Miyagi | Jodie McDowell |
| Weasel | Mariko Miyagi | Sara Meric |

== Production ==
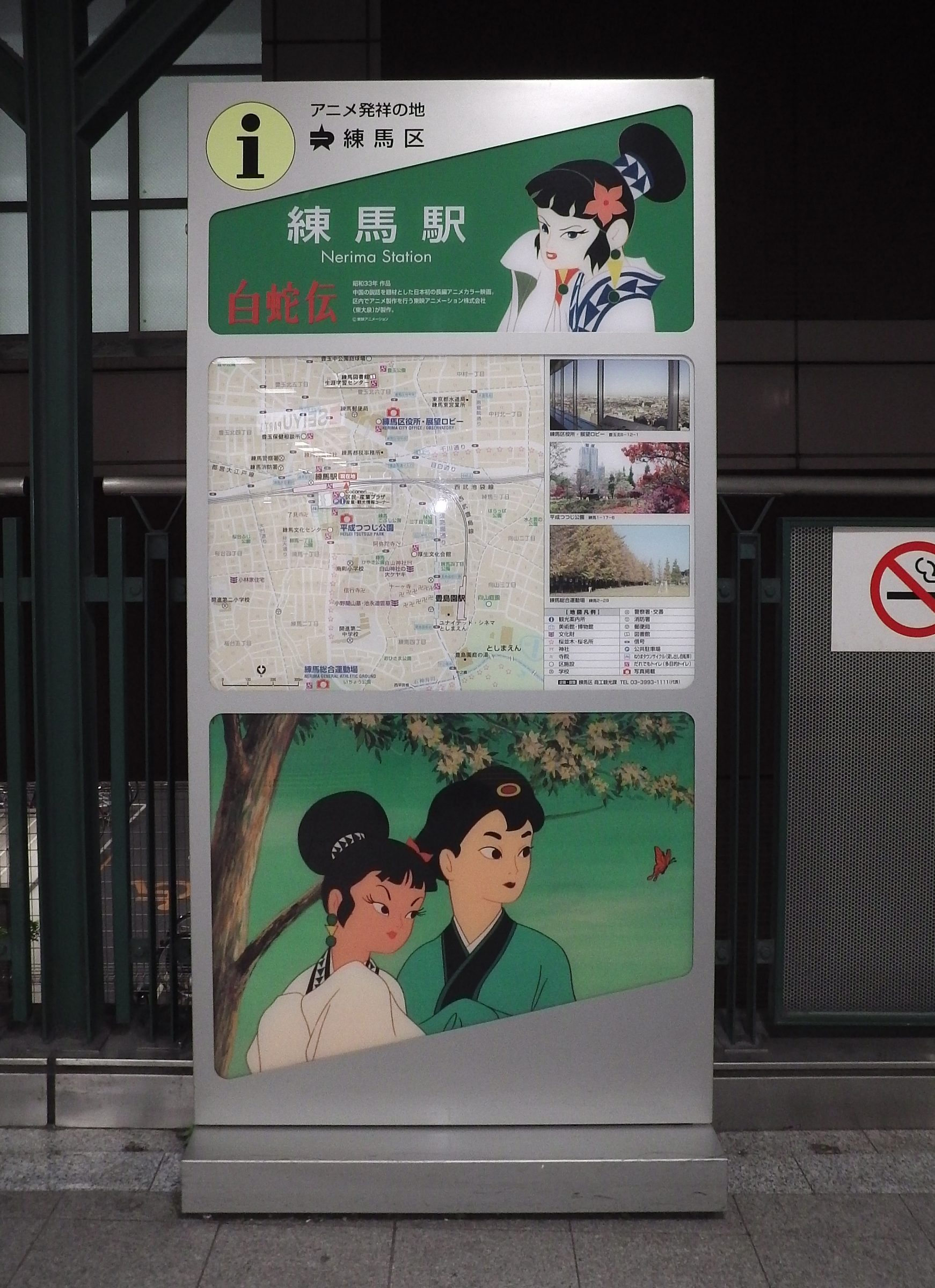
Landmark at Nerima City, Tokyo

The film is essentially an adaptation of the Song dynasty Chinese folktale Legend of the White Snake (白蛇傳). Shin Uehara adapted the folktale and kept the Chinese-style characters and names. The decision of a Chinese story being used as the concept blueprint came from Toei Doga president Hiroshi Ōkawa, who wanted to strike a tone of reconciliation with the Asian neighbors.

Given the point in time, the film pushed Japanese animation technology to the limit. The film was a large-scale major project, involving all 60 staff members to produce a total of 13,590 key drawings and over 65,000 total animation cels; it only took eight months to finish. And while the film received honors at the Venice International Children's Film Festival in Italy in 1959, it was regarded as a disappointment when released to the United States on July 8, 1961, by Global Pictures. Historically, this film marked Tōei Dōga's first attempt to follow the example of American feature animation studios and become the so-called "Disney of the east."

The US version made changes to the film such as interpreting the small red panda, Mimi, as a cat.

Rintaro, who would later go on to become a well-known and respected director of Japanese animation, had his first job in the animation industry (at age 17) as an in-betweener on this film.

== Reception ==
In 2001, the staff of Animage listed The White Snake Enchantress as the most important anime of all time.

== See also ==
- History of anime
- The Legend of the White Serpent (film)

== Bibliography ==
- Panda and the Magic Serpent, DVD, Cartoon Craze.
