= Duanqiao =

Duanqiao (simplified Chinese: 断桥; traditional Chinese: 斷橋; lit. 'Broken Bridge') may refer to:

- Duanqiao, Guizhou, a town in Guanling Buyei and Miao Autonomous County, Guizhou, China
- Duanqiao gas field, a natural gas field in Xihu Trough below the East China Sea
- Broken Bridge, a traditional Chinese opera based on the Legend of the White Snake, related to the West Lake bridge

== Tourist attractions ==
- Yalu River Broken Bridge, a half-destroyed bridge over the Yalu River in Dandong, Liaoning, China
- Longteng Bridge or Longteng Broken Bridge, a damaged bridge in Sanyi Township, Miaoli County, Taiwan
- Broken Bridge (Hangzhou), Zhejiang, China

== See also ==
- Broken bridge (disambiguation)
