= Broken bridge =

Broken bridge may refer to:

- Bridge to nowhere, a bridge with at least one broken side
- Broken bridge, Chennai, India
- Yalu River Broken Bridge, Dandong, China
- The Broken Bridge, a 1990 young-adult novel by Philip Pullman
- Broken Bridges, a 2006 American film by Steven Goldmann

== See also ==
- Duanqiao (disambiguation) for Chinese topics
