= Po-Chu Chui =

Hong Kong film producer

Po-Chu Chui or Bo-Chu Chui (– 8 September 2019) was a Hong Kong film producer, known for collaborating with Stephen Chow and Jet Li.

== Filmography ==
- And the Love Lingers, (executive, 1977)
- The Story of Woo Viet, (1981)
- Fong Sai-yuk II, (1993)
- Tai Chi Master, (1993)
- God.com, (1998)
- Crouching Tiger, Hidden Dragon, (associate, 2000)
- So Close, (2002)
- Kung Fu Hustle, (2004)
- Fearless, (2006)
- CJ7, (2008)
- Murderer, (executive, 2009)
- Jump, (2009)
- Confucius, (2010)
- The Sorcerer and the White Snake, (2011)
- Badges of Fury, (2013)
- Top Funny Comedian: The Movie, (2017)
