= So Close (film) =

2002 Hong Kong film by Corey Yuen

- Film poster

Chinese name
- Traditional Chinese: 夕陽天使
- Simplified Chinese: 夕阳天使
Transcriptions
Standard Mandarin
- Hanyu Pinyin: Xīyáng Tiānshǐ
Yue: Cantonese
- Jyutping: Zik6-joeng4 Tin1-si2
- Directed by: Corey Yuen
- Written by: Jeffrey Lau
- Produced by: Po-Chu Chui
- Starring: Shu Qi; Zhao Wei; Karen Mok
- Cinematography: Venus Keung; Chan Chi-ying
- Edited by: Cheung Ka-fai
- Music by: Sam Kao; Kenjo Tan
- Production companies: Columbia Pictures Film Production Asia; Eastern Film Production (HK)
- Distributed by: Columbia TriStar Film Distributors International
- Release date: 6 September 2002
- Running time: 110 minutes
- Country: Hong Kong
- Language: Cantonese
- Box office: HK$880,332

So Close is a 2002 Hong Kong action film directed by Corey Yuen and starring Shu Qi, Zhao Wei and Karen Mok. The film details the successful mission of the assassin sisters but their relationship becomes complicated when one of them falls in love with a man, while they are pursued by criminals who hired them.

== Plot ==
Lynn and her sister Sue are computer hackers, assassins and espionage specialists who use their late father's secret satellite technology to gain an advantage over their rivals and law enforcement agents. At the beginning of the film, they infiltrate a high security building and assassinate Chow Lui, the chairman of a top company in China.

After their successful mission, a police inspector named Kong Yat-hung is assigned to investigate the case and she manages to track down the assassins. In the meantime, Chow Lui's younger brother Chow Nung, who hired Lynn and Sue to kill his brother so that he can become the chairman, wants to kill the assassins to silence them. The cat-and-mouse chase becomes more complicated as both the police and the thugs are out to get Lynn and Sue.

Sue has always been playing the role of the assistant by staying on the computer and helping to disable the security systems and giving instructions on navigating the area, while Lynn, who is older and more experienced, does all the field work. Sue is jealous and thinks that Lynn refuses to let her participate more actively because she is less adept, but actually Lynn is trying to protect her sister from danger. Their relationship becomes strained when Lynn falls in love with her friend's cousin Yen and wants to give up her job and marry Yen. Sue intends to continue her career as a contract killer so that she can prove that she is as good as her sister.

Kong Yat-hung tracks down Sue in a bakery, where Sue is buying a birthday cake, and this leads to a frantic car chase. When Sue realises that she is being cornered by the police, she calls Lynn at home and asks her sister for help. At the same time, Chow Nung's assassins break into the house and kill Lynn and frame Kong Yat-hung for the murder. Sue escapes from the police and finds out the true identities of her sister's killers from the CCTVs in the house. She rescues Kong Yat-hung from custody and offers to help her clear her name, but Kong must assist her in avenging her sister. Left with no choice, Kong Yat-hung agrees to team up with Sue to hunt down and kill Chow Nung and his henchmen. Over the course of planning the counter-attack, Sue and Kong Yat-hung bond.

Sue and Kong Yat-hung succeed in defeating Chow Nung. They share a kiss, and agree that if not due to the nature of their line of work (one a police and the other a criminal), they might have become closer. With that, they part ways.

Sue visits Lynn's grave, thanking her for everything that her sister had done, and she can now take care of herself. She promises Lynn that she will tell Yen the whole ordeal, knowing that Yen is "the guy Lynn loves the most". The film ends with a scene where Yen is still waiting for Lynn at a restaurant which they had promised to meet.

== Cast ==
- Shu Qi as Lynn, a assassins and espionage specialists and Sue's older sister
- Zhao Wei as Sue, Lynn's younger sister and a computer hackers
- Karen Mok as Kong Yat-hung, a police inspector
- Song Seung-heon as Yen
- Michael Wai as Ma Siu-ma
- Kurata Yasuaki as Master
- Deric Wan as Chow Nung
- Shek Sau as Chow Lui
- Josephine Lam as Alice Chow
- Ben Lam as Ben
- Ricardo Mamood as Peter
- May Kwong as May
- Henry Fong as Lynn and Sue's father
- Paw Hee-ching as Lynn and Sue's mother
- Tats Lau as Ghost King
- Kam Hing-yin as Captain
- Josie Ho as Ching
- Jude Poyer as murderer
- Dave Taylor as murderer
- David John Saunders as murderer
- Leon Head as murderer
- Lam Seung-mo as Lai Kai-joe
- Leo Ku as man in lift
- Wong So-bik as May
- Ben Yuen as Mr Yeung
- Huang Kaisen as Wong Fat-chi
- Victy Wong as bodyguard
- Wong Wai-fai as bodyguard
- So Wai-nam as bodyguard
- Kong Foo-keung as robber
- John Cheung as cop
- Keung Hak-shing as Lee Hong-fai
- Adam Chan
- Kenji Tanigaki
- Lam Kwok-git

== Production ==
Yuen had wanted Coco Lee to have a role in the film, but scheduling issues prevented her from being cast. To inspire the three female leads to train harder, Yuen showed Zhao and Mok a scene of Shu in action, enhancing Shu's abilities in the editing process in order to fuel Zhao and Mok's competitive spirit.

== Reception ==
So Close holds an average rating of 6.7/10 based on 37 reviews on Rotten Tomatoes and an average score of 66/100 based on 18 reviews on Metacritic.

== Awards and nominations ==
Awards
Award	Category	Name	Outcome
Central Ohio Film Critics Association	Best Foreign-Language Film		Nominated
Hong Kong Film Awards	Best Action Choreography	Corey Yuen; Jianyong Gao	Nominated

== See also ==
- Girls with guns
