= Xiaoqing (character) =

Character in the Legend of the White Snake

- Legend of the White Snake character
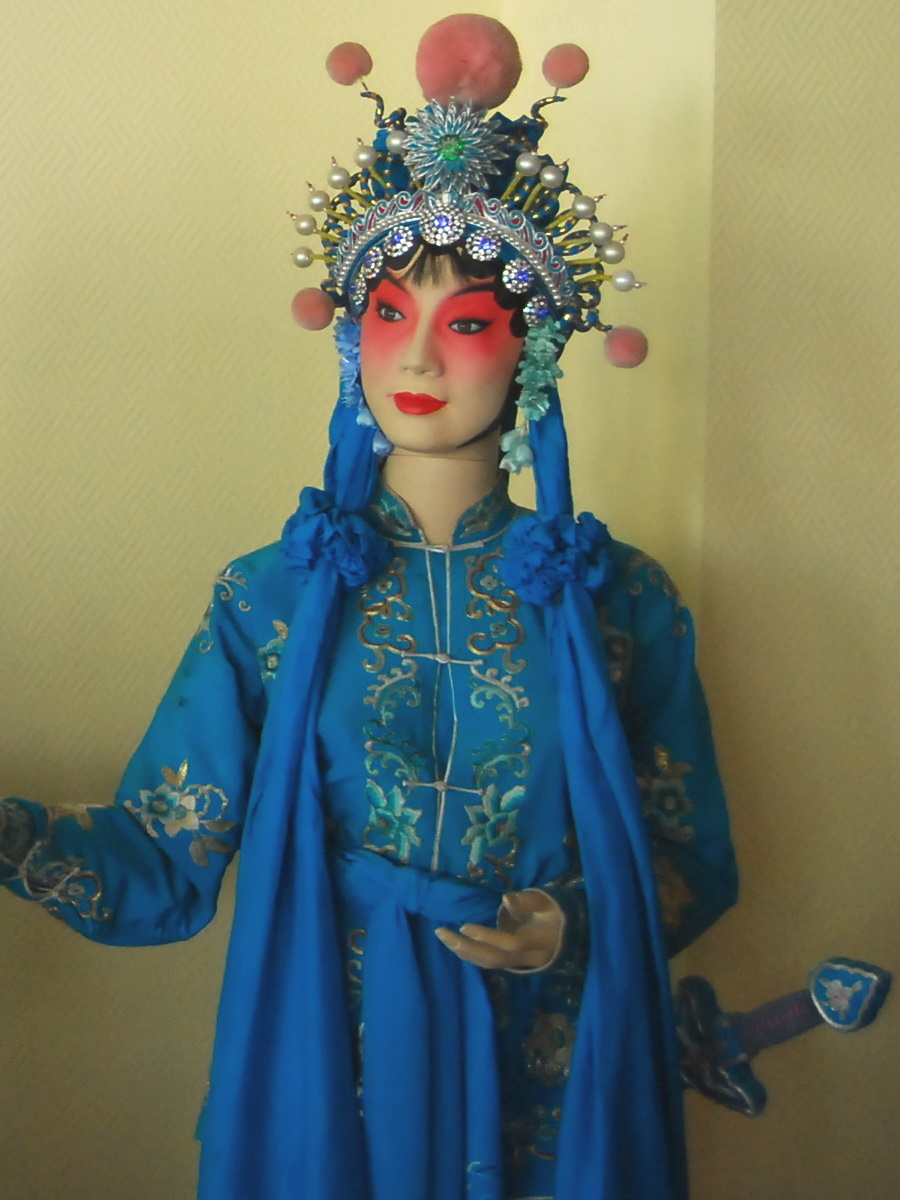
- Statue of Xiaoqing as depicted in Beijing Opera

In-universe information
- Aliases: Green Snake, Blue Snake
- Nicknames: Qing'er, Qing mei, Qingqing
- Species: Snake
- Gender: Female
- Family: Bai Suzhen (sworn sister)
- Religion: Taoism
- Home: Mount Emei

Xiaoqing
- Chinese: 小青
Transcriptions
Standard Mandarin
- Hanyu Pinyin: Xiǎoqīng
- Wade–Giles: Hsiao^{3}chʻing^{1}
Yue: Cantonese
- Yale Romanization: Síuchīng
- Jyutping: Siu^{2}cing^{1}

Qingqing
- Chinese: 青青
Transcriptions
Standard Mandarin
- Hanyu Pinyin: Qīngqīng
- Wade–Giles: Chʻing^{1}chʻing^{1}
Yue: Cantonese
- Yale Romanization: Chīngchīng
- Jyutping: Cing^{1}cing^{1}

Qingmei
- Chinese: 青妹
Transcriptions
Standard Mandarin
- Hanyu Pinyin: Qīngmèi
- Wade–Giles: Chʻing^{1}mei^{4}
Yue: Cantonese
- Yale Romanization: Chīngmuih
- Jyutping: Cing^{1}mui^{6}

Qing'er
- Traditional Chinese: 青兒
- Simplified Chinese: 青儿
Transcriptions
Standard Mandarin
- Hanyu Pinyin: Qīng'ér
- Wade–Giles: Chʻing^{1}êrh^{2}
Yue: Cantonese
- Yale Romanization: Chīngyìh
- Jyutping: Cing^{1}ji^{4}

Xiaoqing (Chinese: 小青; lit. 'Little Green' or 'Little Blue') or Qingqing (Chinese: 青青) is a green or blue snake spirit and one of the protagonists of the Legend of the White Snake, one of China's "four great folktales".

== Legends ==
Xiaoqing is a green snake who transforms into a human being after seven hundred years of disciplined training in Taoism. Xiaoqing is the close confidant or sworn sister of the protagonist Bai Suzhen, the white snake. Bai Suzhen often calls her Qingmei (青妹, lit. '[Little] Sister Green') or Qing'er (青兒, lit. 'Child Green').

After Fahai pushed Bai Suzhen down under the Leifeng Pagoda, Xiaoqing was no match for Fahai, and had no choice but to retreat to Mount Emei, go back into the cave and return to practicing Daoist austerities. Twelve years later, she had finally completed the True Fire of Samadhi, and came to find Fahai for revenge. There was nowhere for Fahai to escape being burned by the True Fire of Samadhi, so in a great rush, he hid inside a crab shell. Leifang Pagoda collapsed, and Bai Suzhen was saved. From then on, she and Bai Suzhen, Xu Xian and their child all lived a blessed and happy life together.

Xiaoqing's fate varies depending on the preference of the storyteller. In some versions, Xiaoqing and Bai Suzhen are fused together in the Leifeng Pagoda; in others, Xiaoqing marries Xu Xian (or a friend of his) and has a son, Xu Rulin. Sometimes it is said she never married, instead devoting herself to neidan, and in an even more extreme variation, she is portrayed as a treacherous antagonist who betrays Bai Suzhen. However, in almost all versions, Xiaoqing finally becomes a deity.

In another version of the story, after years of refining her powers, Xiaoqing goes to Jinshan Temple to confront Fahai and ultimately defeats him. As a result, Bai Suzhen is finally freed from Leifeng Pagoda and reunited with her husband and son. Meanwhile, Fahai flees and hides inside the stomach of a crab. There is a saying that a crab's internal fat is orange because it resembles the color of Fahai's kasaya.

== Worship ==
Located in Jizhou, Tianjin, the White Snake Cave is where the statues of Bai Suzhen and Xiaoqing stand as deities. Legend has it that the White Snake and Green Snake practiced Taoism within this cave.

== Influence ==
The popular film Green Snake features Xiaoqing as the main character. It is an adaptation of the novel of the same name by Lilian Lee, published in 1993.

== Gallery ==
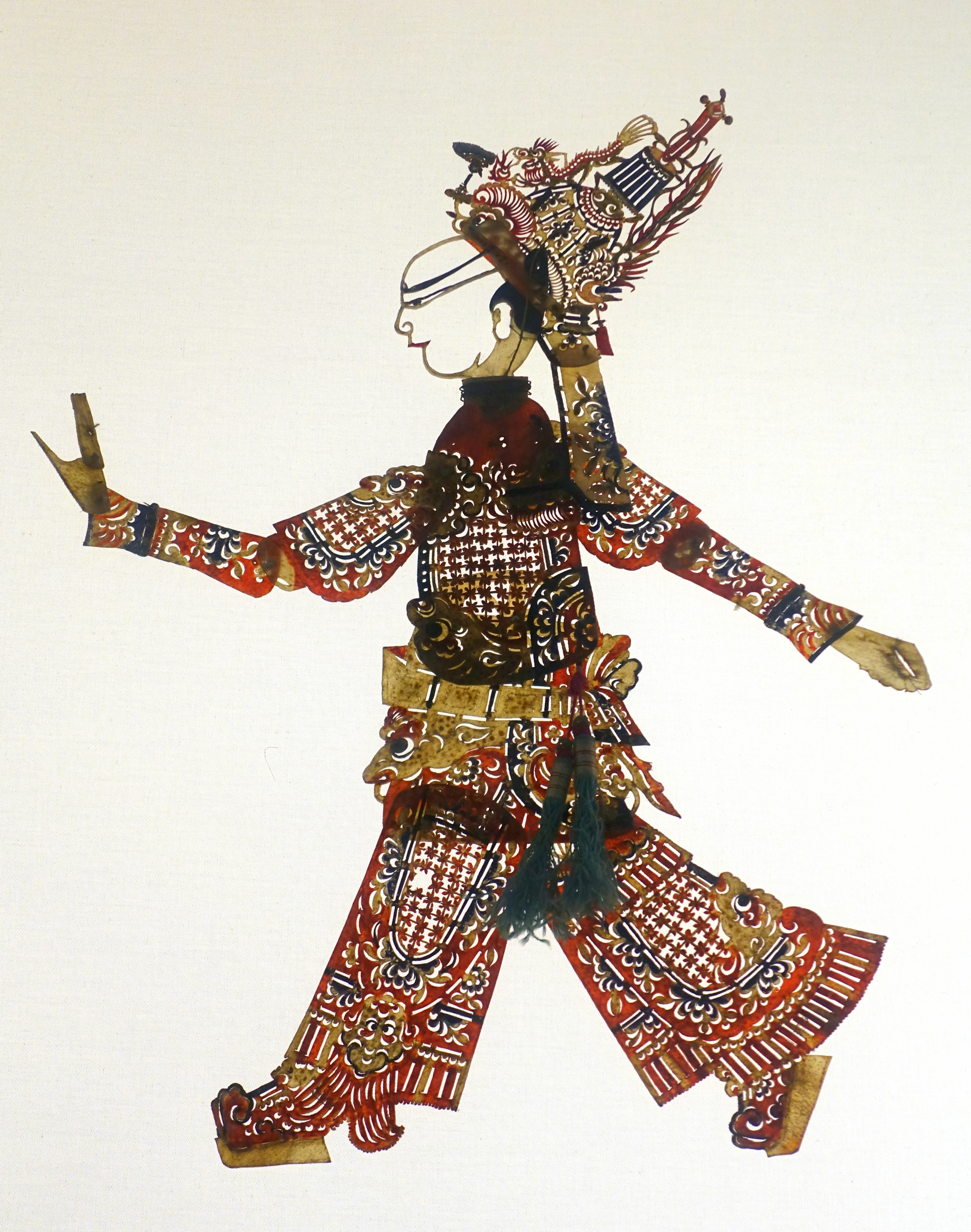
Exhibit in the Sichuan Provincial Museum

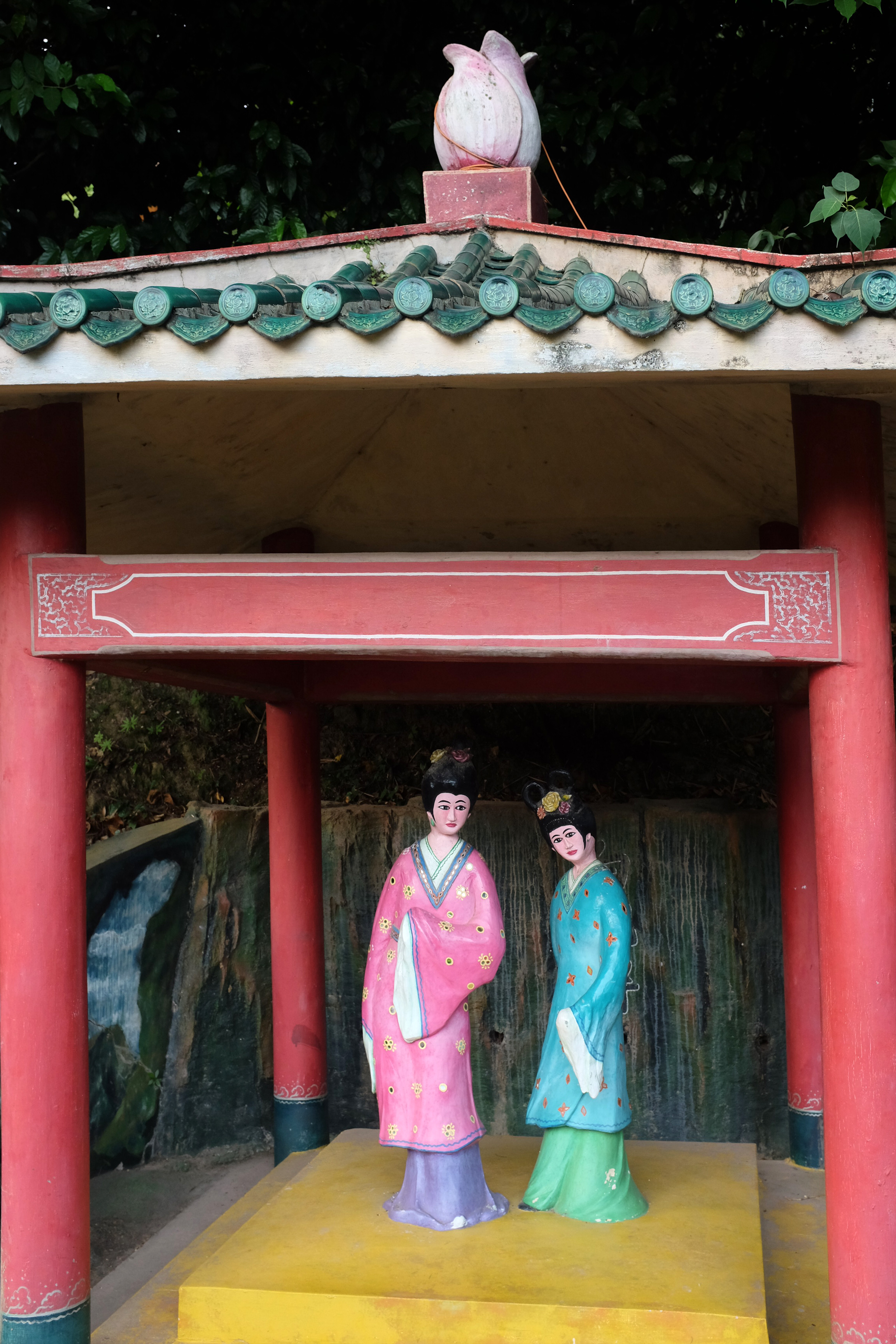
Statues of Bai Suzhen and Xiaoqing

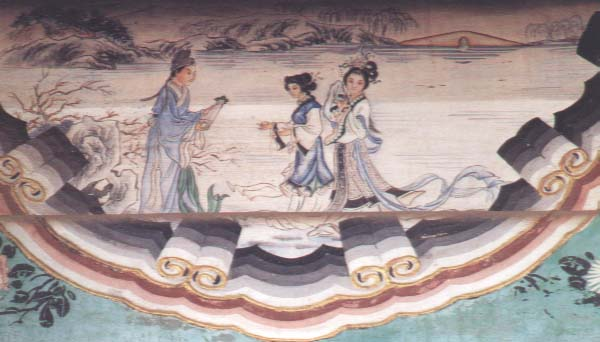
Picture on the long veranda in the Summer Palace, Beijing, China

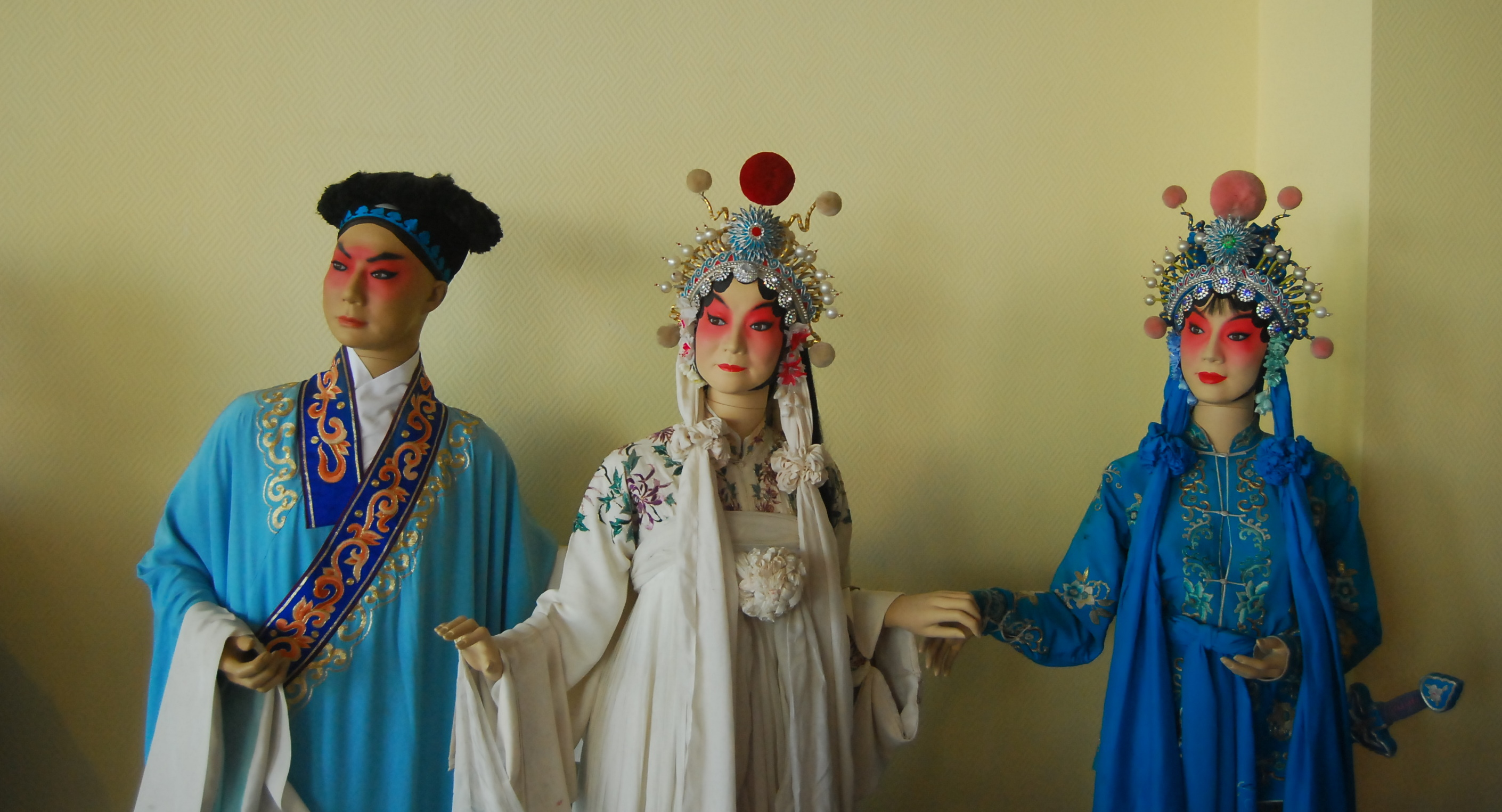
Statues of the three protagonists in the Peking opera

== See also ==
- Legend of the White Snake
- Green Snake
