= Broken Bridge (Hangzhou) =

Bridge in Hangzhou, China

Coordinates: 30°15′25″N 120°08′37″E

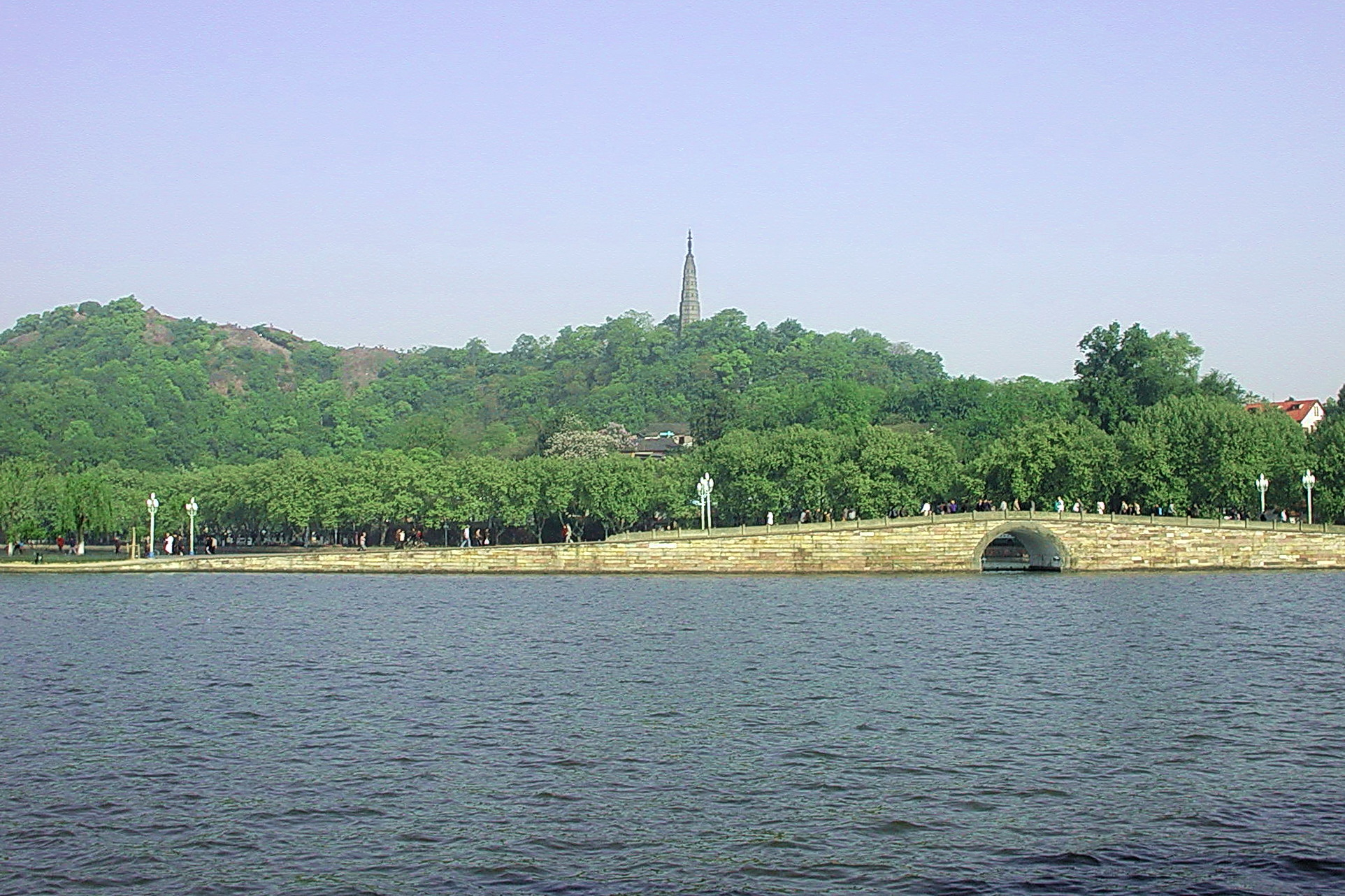
Broken Bridge, West Lake, Hangzhou.

Broken Bridge (simplified Chinese: 断桥; traditional Chinese: 斷橋; pinyin: Duàn Qiáo) is a bridge near the West Lake in Hangzhou, China. It is a small, three-span, semicircular stone arch. The current bridge was built in 1922 but its history dates from the Tang dynasty. It was known as Baoyou Bridge (寶祐橋) during the Song dynasty and Duanjia Bridge (段家橋) during the Yuan dynasty.

The bridge is not broken. It is so named because on certain winter days the bridge appears broken when viewed from afar, when the snow on the south side of the bridge melts under the sun but the north side is still covered in snow.

Broken Bridge is popular with tourists due to its connection with the Legend of the White Snake.

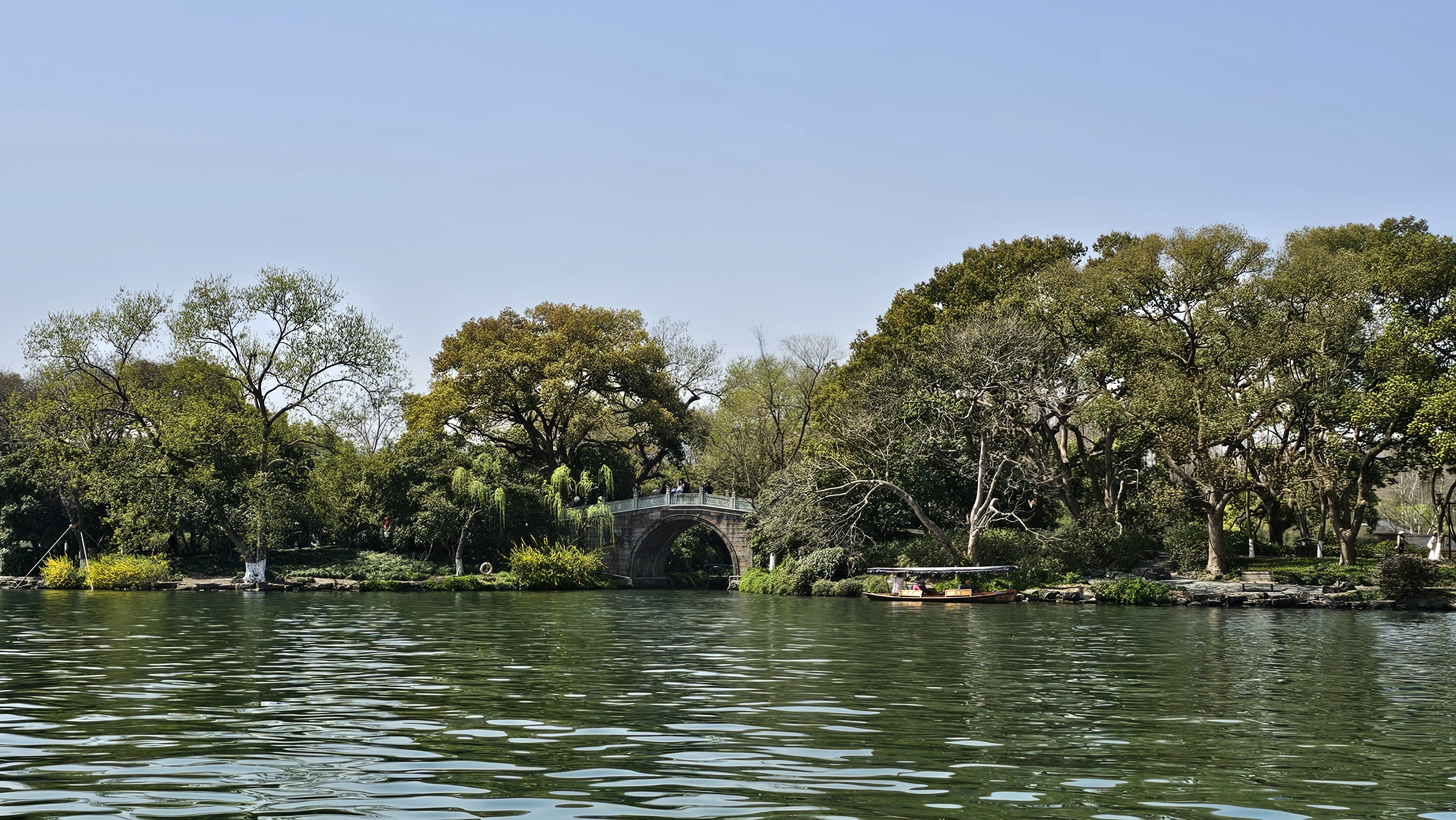
Broken Bridge from a Boat
