= Legend of the White Snake =

Chinese legend

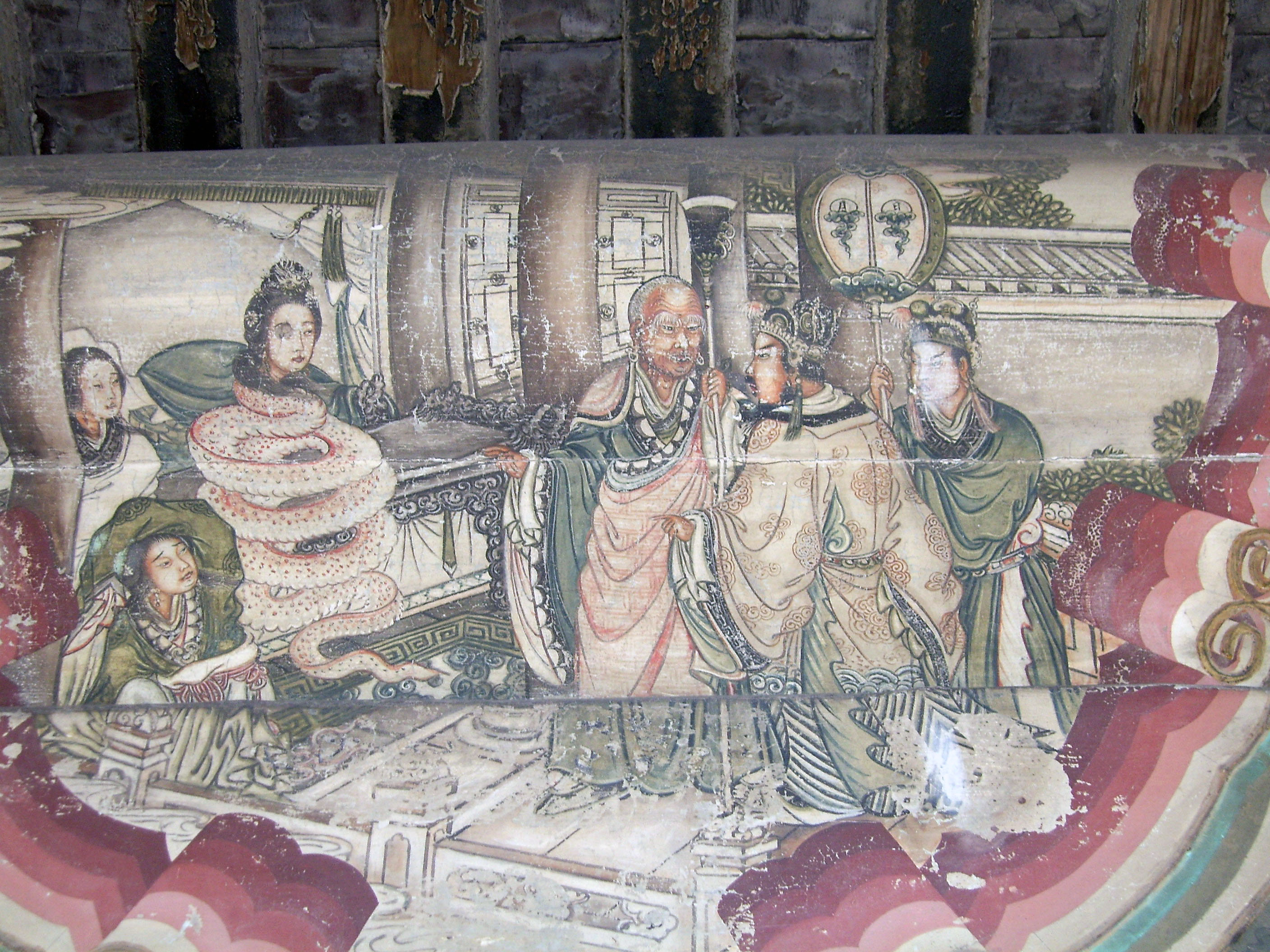
- Image from the Summer Palace, Beijing, China, depicting the legend
- Traditional Chinese: 白蛇傳
- Simplified Chinese: 白蛇传
Transcriptions
Standard Mandarin
- Hanyu Pinyin: Bái Shé Zhuàn
Yue: Cantonese
- Jyutping: Baak^{6} Se^{4} Cyun^{4}
Southern Min
- Hokkien POJ: Pe̍k-siâ-tōan or Pe̍h-siâ-tōan

The Legend of the White Snake (Chinese: 白蛇傳; pinyin: Báishézhuàn) is a Chinese legend centered around a romance between a man named Xu Xian and a female snake spirit named Bai Suzhen. It is counted as one of China's Four Great Folktales, the others being Lady Meng Jiang, Butterfly Lovers, and The Cowherd and the Weaver Girl (or occasionally The Tale of Liu Yi or The Marriage of the Fairy Princess).

The story has evolved and changed over different eras and regions to suit the preferences of the populace and rulers, serving as subject matter for novels, operas, and other media.

== Overview ==
Originally, the story was a simple folk tale with a broad framework in which a white snake demon transforms into a beautiful woman in white to abduct young men, satisfying her lust and eating their heart and liver. As times changed, various episodes were added or removed, and it eventually developed into a romance between a human male and a woman who is the incarnation of a white snake. Although the White Snake and the human become husband and wife, her true identity is eventually exposed by a Zen master or monk possessing spiritual powers, and she is imprisoned in the Leifeng Pagoda by the West Lake (Hangzhou).

However, in the process of development and change, the demon's original malicious intent was removed. The reasons for the White Snake's extermination were no longer emphasized, and the focus shifted to the romance. Eventually, versions were created that even feature a happy ending.

Kawada Ko (2014) speculates that stories involving snakes became prominently frequent in China from the medieval period onwards. As various stories were created and passed down through the early modern period, the legend was gradually formed and developed. Kawada suggests that the transition of the Legend of the White Snake projects the process of China moving from ancient times to the modern era.

The legend gained significant attention in post-war Japan. In 1956, on the orders of Zhou Enlai, a Peking opera troupe led by Mei Lanfang visited Japan and performed pieces from The Legend of the White Snake. That same year, Japan's first color special effects film, The Legend of the White Serpent (Toho), was released. In 1958, Japan's first color feature-length animated film, The White Snake Enchantress (film) (Toei), was released, making the story familiar to the general Japanese public.

It has also been pointed out that this legend is related to the Lamia of Greek mythology. Chinese folklorist and scholar Ting Nai-tung classified the versions of The White Snake under the Aarne–Thompson–Uther Index tale type ATU 411, "The King and the Lamia". In the Chinese type, the snake-like wife (lamia) is "always" a white snake, who is confronted by a holy man and reveals her serpentine disguise to her human husband, and, in some tales, can be banished under a pagoda.

== History and Evolution of the Tale ==
=== "Li Huang" (Tang Dynasty) ===
The Tang dynasty story collection Boyi zhi (博異志; "Vast Records of the Strange"), by Gu Shenzi (Zheng Huangu, mid-Tang era), contains a chuanqi tale titled "Li Huang" (李黃). This is considered the oldest surviving story related to the Legend of the White Snake. It was later included in the Taiping Guangji.

Synopsis of "Li Huang": In the second year of the Yuanhe era (807), Li Huang, the nephew of the Salt and Iron Commissioner Li Xun, met a beautiful woman in white riding an ox cart in the East Market of Chang'an. When he asked her maidservant, he was told that she was a widow whose mourning period for her husband had just ended and that she had no money. Li Huang advanced her money and silk, and was invited to her residence. An old woman claiming to be the white-clad lady's aunt (clothed in blue-green) appeared, claiming they were poor and owed 30,000 cash, and offered to let the lady serve him. Li Huang sent a servant to fetch 30,000 cash and stayed there for three days at their invitation. On the fourth day, the old woman urged him to return home temporarily so his uncle would not blame him for staying out so long. The servant noticed that Li Huang smelled raw and fishy but returned home as ordered. When asked by his family what he had been doing for days, he fell ill and immediately went to bed. Eventually, he began to rave incoherently and told his fiancée that he was done for. When the bedding was fearfully lifted, his body had dissolved into water, leaving only his head. The family questioned the servant and went to the woman's house, but found only a desolate garden. There was a single Chinese honey locust tree; atop the tree was 15,000 cash, and beneath it another 15,000. Neighbors said that other than a large white snake often seen coiled under the tree, there was nothing there.

A different version appended in the Taiping Guangjiis named as "Another Version," where the plot is largely the same but with slight differences. The protagonist's name is Li Guan, and instead of his body turning to water, his head splits open and he dies. When the family went to the location of the woman's house, they found a withered pagoda tree, with traces of a large snake coiling. Digging up the roots, they found several small white snakes, which they killed before returning home.

=== "The Three Pagodas of West Lake" (Song/Ming Dynasty) ===
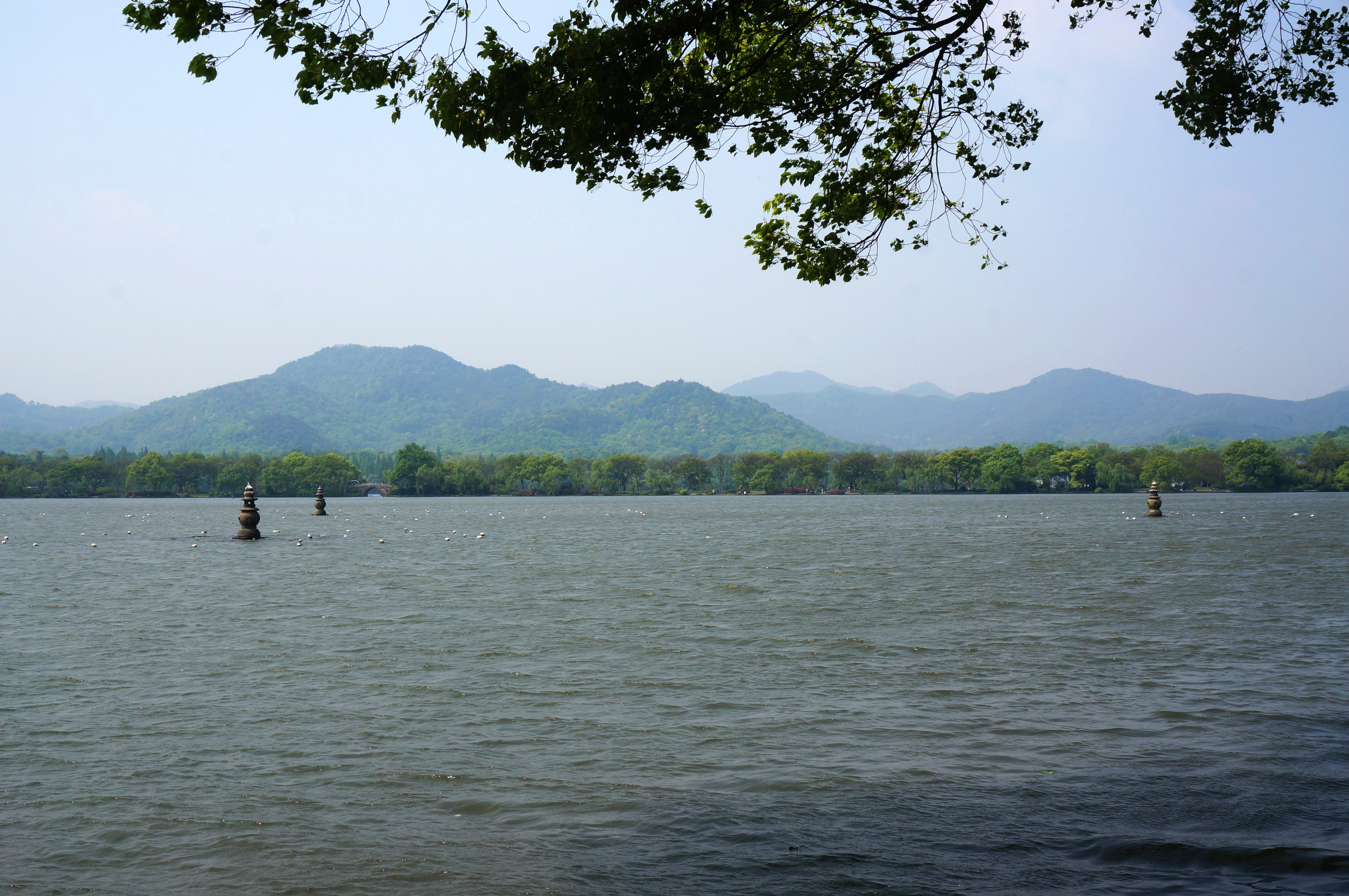
The three stone pagodas of West Lake.

Around the Jiajing era of the Ming dynasty (1541–1551), a story considered to be the formation of the "White Snake Legend" appeared: "The Three Pagodas of West Lake" (西湖三塔記) in the Qingpingshantang Huaben compiled by Hong Pian (洪楩). This was a written record of a storyteller's script and is considered the oldest existing huaben. Aoki Masaru in "The Novel 'West Lake Three Pagodas' and 'Thunder Peak Pagoda'" suggests that a story involving the three pagodas standing in West Lake seems to be the prototype. However, in this *huaben*, the "Thunder Peak Pagoda" (Leifeng Pagoda) does not yet appear; instead, it features "three stone pagodas."

Synopsis of "The Three Pagodas of West Lake": In the Chunxi era (1174–1189) of Emperor Xiaozong of Song, Xi Xuanzan (奚宣贊), the only son of a commander named Xi serving under Yue Fei and living inside the Yongjin Gate of Lin'an Prefecture, went sightseeing at West Lake during the Qingming Festival. There, he found a lost girl dressed entirely in white silk. When asked, she said her name was Bai (White), she lived at West Lake, and had become separated from her grandmother. Since the girl grabbed Xuanzan's clothes and wouldn't let go, he took her home. Her name was Maonu. After more than ten days, an old woman dressed in black arrived in a sedan chair, claiming to be the grandmother. She invited Xuanzan to her home to thank him. Upon arriving at a mansion, a lady in white (the mother) appeared. Hearing that Xuanzan had saved her daughter, she treated him to a feast of delicacies. A servant then suggested killing a "former one" since a "new one" had arrived. The lady agreed to use him as a side dish for Xuanzan. Two strong men dragged out a young man, tied him to a pillar, cut open his belly, and presented his heart and liver to the lady. Xuanzan was too terrified to drink. After the lady and the old woman finished eating the organs, the lady seduced Xuanzan, asking him to marry her since she was a widow. They stayed together for over half a month. Xuanzan, looking yellow and emaciated, asked to go home temporarily. A servant then appeared suggesting the lady dispose of the "former one" (Xuanzan) as a "new one" had arrived. Just as his heart was about to be taken, Maonu begged for his life since he had saved her. Maonu told Xuanzan to keep his eyes closed, carried him on her back, and flew away. Xuanzan felt her neck and realized she had feathers. When he opened his eyes upon landing, he was on the city wall. A year later, during the Qingming Festival, Xuanzan was hunting birds with a crossbow. He shot a crow, which fell and turned into the old woman in black. He was captured and again forced to be the husband of the lady in white for half a month. Again faced with death, Maonu saved him. Later, Xuanzan's uncle, the Daoist Xi Zhenren from Mount Longhu, arrived. Seeing a black aura, he realized his nephew was possessed by demons. He summoned divine generals at the Four Sages Shrine by West Lake to capture the three demons. They appeared as a black chicken (Maonu), an otter (the old woman), and a white snake (the lady in white). The Zhenren trapped them in an iron cage, sank them into West Lake, and built three stone pagodas to suppress them. Xuanzan became a lay disciple of his uncle and lived out his life.

=== "Double Fish Fan Pendant" (Ming Dynasty) ===
Around the Wanli era of the Ming Dynasty (1573–1620), the story "The Double Fish Fan Pendant" (Shuangyu Shanzhui; also known as Kong Shufang Shuangyu Shanzhui Zhuan) appeared, seemingly based on Southern Song storytelling scripts. In this version, the seductress is a ghost rather than a white snake, but the plot of a young merchant being seduced and nearly killed, then saved by a Zhenren (Daoist spiritual master), parallels "The Three Pagodas of West Lake". Similarities have also been pointed out with "The Peony Lantern" (Mudan Deng Ji) from the Jiandeng Xinhua (c. 1378).

Synopsis of "Double Fish Fan Pendant": In the Hongzhi era (1488–1505), Xu Jingchun, a 26-year-old merchant, met a beautiful woman named Kong Shufang and her maid Yumei. She claimed to be the daughter of a local official. Jingchun was seduced and spent the night with her. Neighbors found him passed out in a graveyard. Although cured by rituals, he later encountered Kong Shufang again upon returning from a business trip. She gave him a fan pendant shaped like two fish. He fell under her spell again, and his health deteriorated. His father sought help from a Daoist master at Ziyang Palace. The master summoned gods to arrest the spirits. Under torture, Kong Shufang confessed she was a ghost seeking love. The master sent the two spirits to the King of Hell for punishment, and Jingchun recovered.

=== "Madam White Is Kept Forever Under the Thunder Peak Tower" (Ming Dynasty) ===
The story "Madam White Is Kept Forever Under the Thunder Peak Tower" (白娘子永鎭雷峰塔) in Feng Menglong's influential 1624 collection Stories to Caution the World (Jingshi Tongyan, Vol. 28) became the pivot point for the development of the White Snake legend. While "The Three Pagodas" had two purposes for the demon (lust and eating liver), this version replaces the eating of liver with theft. The setting also shifts from Hangzhou/West Lake to Suzhou and Zhenjiang before returning to West Lake. This story began to portray the White Snake in a more sympathetic perspective. This story is considered the basis for the Japanese story "The Lust of the White Serpent" in Ueda Akinari's Ugetsu Monogatari.

Synopsis: During the Shaoxing era of the Southern Song, Xu Xuan (許宣; formerly Xi Xuanzan) is a young man working in a herbal medicine shop in Lin'an. On the Qingming Festival, he meets a beautiful woman in white (Bai Niangzi/Lady White) and her maid in blue-green named Qingqing, (青青), a fish spirit) on a boat in the rain. He lends them an umbrella. Bai Niangzi claims to be a widow. They become intimate, and she gives him 50 taels of silver to arrange their marriage. However, the silver turns out to be stolen from the government treasury. Xu Xuan is arrested, tortured, and exiled to Suzhou for the crime. In Suzhou, Xu Xuan meets Bai Niangzi again. She claims the money was from her late husband and she didn't know it was stolen. They marry. Later, Xu Xuan meets a Daoist who warns him of a demon. He tries to burn a talisman to reveal her form, but she talks her way out of it. Later, Xu Xuan is accused of theft again regarding jewelry Bai Niangzi gave him, and is exiled to Zhenjiang. In Zhenjiang, Xu Xuan works in a medicine shop. He reunites with Bai Niangzi again, who claims the items were inherited. They live together, but a lecherous birthday host spies on her in the bathroom and sees a giant white snake, frightening him to death. Xu Xuan visits Jinshan Temple and meets the Zen master Fahai. Fahai recognizes the demon. When Bai Niangzi arrives to take Xu Xuan back, she creates a storm/flood (though less catastrophic than in later versions). Fahai drives them away. Xu Xuan returns to Hangzhou upon an amnesty. He tries to leave Bai Niangzi, but she threatens to drown the city. Xu Xuan seeks Fahai's help. Fahai gives him an alms bowl to trap her. Xu Xuan places the bowl over her head, shrinking her. Fahai reveals Bai Niangzi is a white snake and Qingqing is a blue fish. He imprisons them under the Leifeng Pagoda. Xu Xuan becomes a monk and eventually dies sitting in meditation.

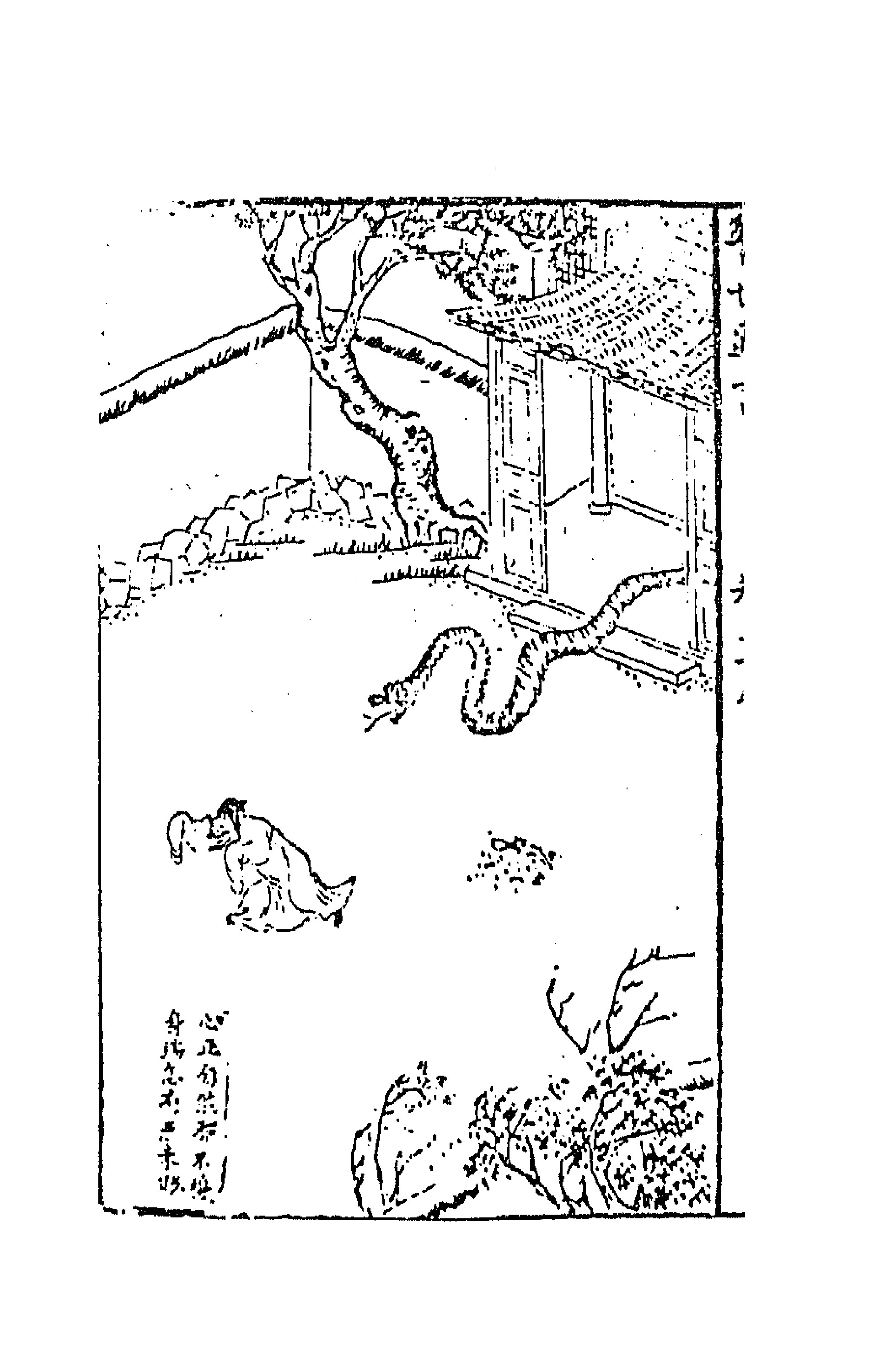
An illustration from Stories to Caution the World (1624).

=== Qing Dynasty Texts ===
The Qing dynasty saw major transformations of the legend thanks to Chinese opera and quyi (storytelling performances).

A modified version of Feng Menglong's story, titled "The Strange Traces of Thunder Peak" (Leifeng Guaiji), was included in the collection Xihu Jiahua (Fine Tales of the West Lake) during the Kangxi era.

Major shifts occurred in texts from the late eighteenth and early nineteenth century, where the White Snake became endearing and devoted, while Fahai's portrayal became more negative.

- Theater: Huang Tubi (黃圖珌)'s 1738 chuanqi play Leifeng Pagoda is considered similar to Feng Menglong's version. However, Fang Chengpei (方成培)'s 1771 Leifeng Pagoda (performed for the Qianlong Emperor) introduced key elements like the "Stealing the Immortal Herb" and the existence of a son born to Bai and Xu.
- Novels:
  - Leifeng Ta Qizhuan (Strange Tale of Thunder Peak Pagoda, 1806) by (玉山主人, "Master of the Jade Mountain").
  - Yiyao Zhuan (義妖傳, The Righteous Demons, preface dated 1809), a tanci by Chen Yuqian (陳遇乾). This work explicitly names the White Snake "Bai Suzhen" (White Pure/Chaste) for the first time.
  - Baishe Quanzhuan (Complete Tale of the White Snake) by Meng Hua Guan Zhu (late Qing). This was the most detailed version, combining elements from Yiyao Zhuan.

In the 20th century, modern playwright Tian Han revised the story three times (1943, 1952, 1955) for the Peking Opera. His versions changed Bai Suzhen from a widow to an unmarried young woman and solidified the current popular version of the story.

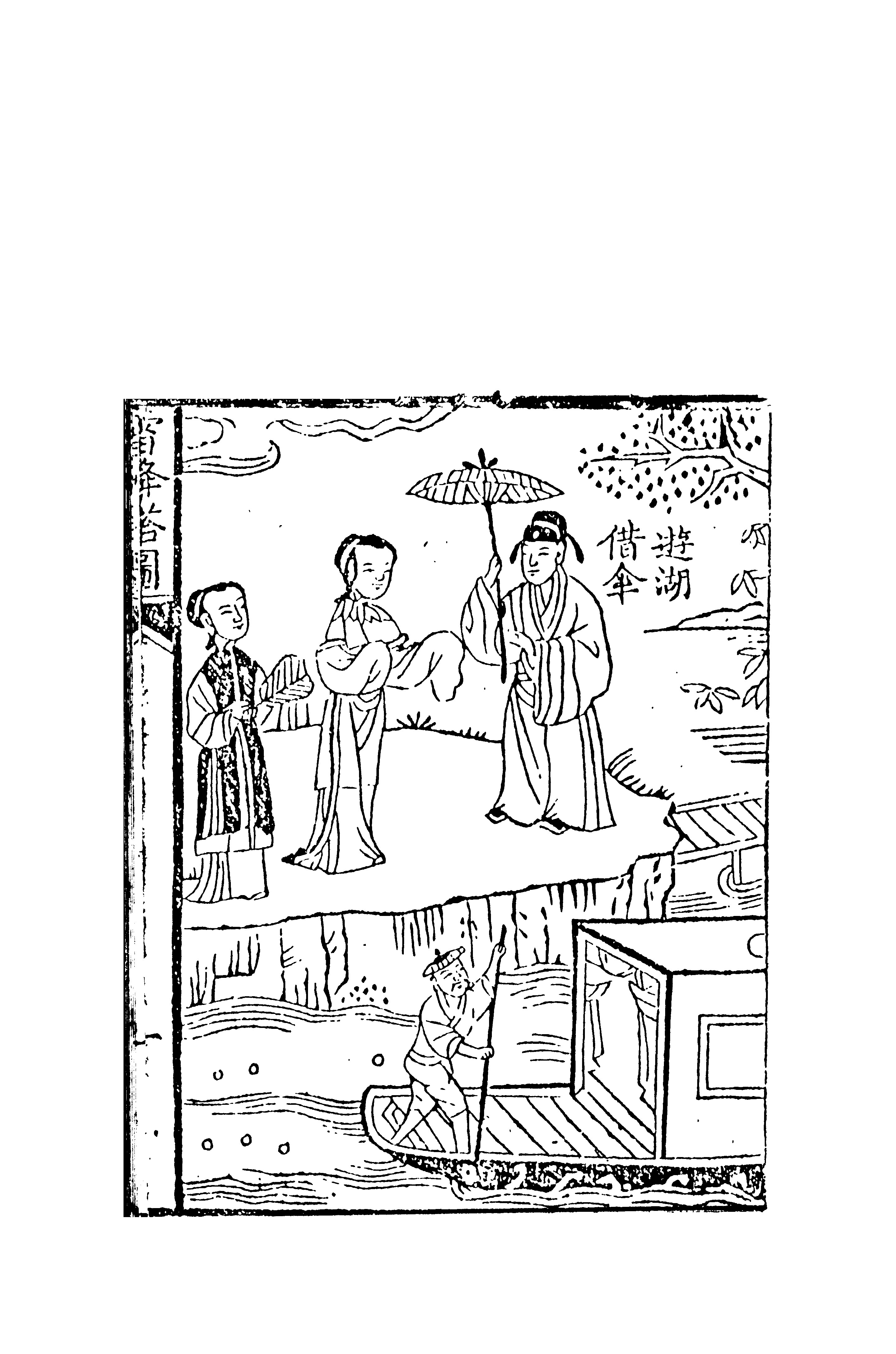
An illustration from Leifeng Pagoda (1806).

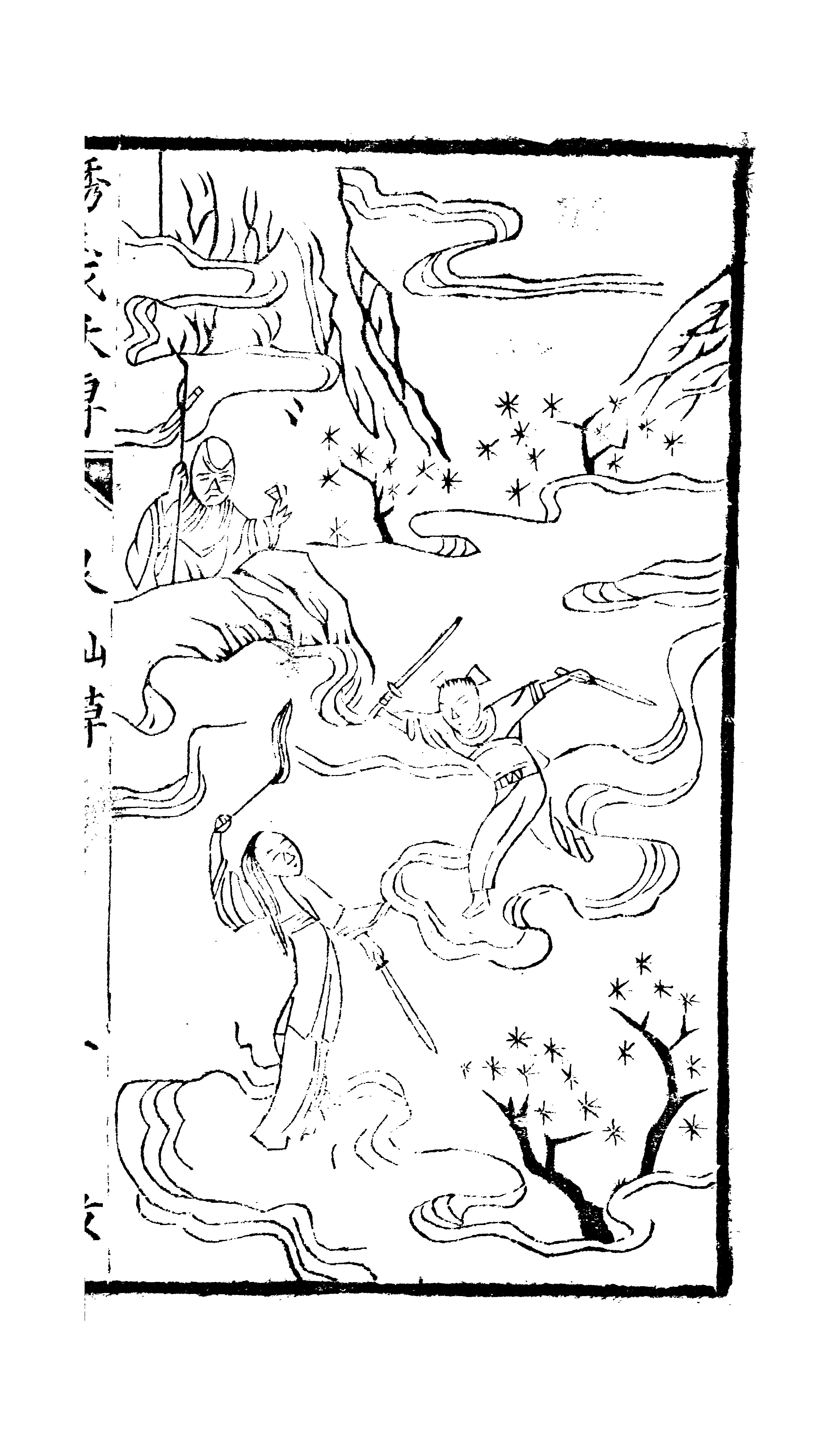
An illustration from The Righteous Demons (1869 print).

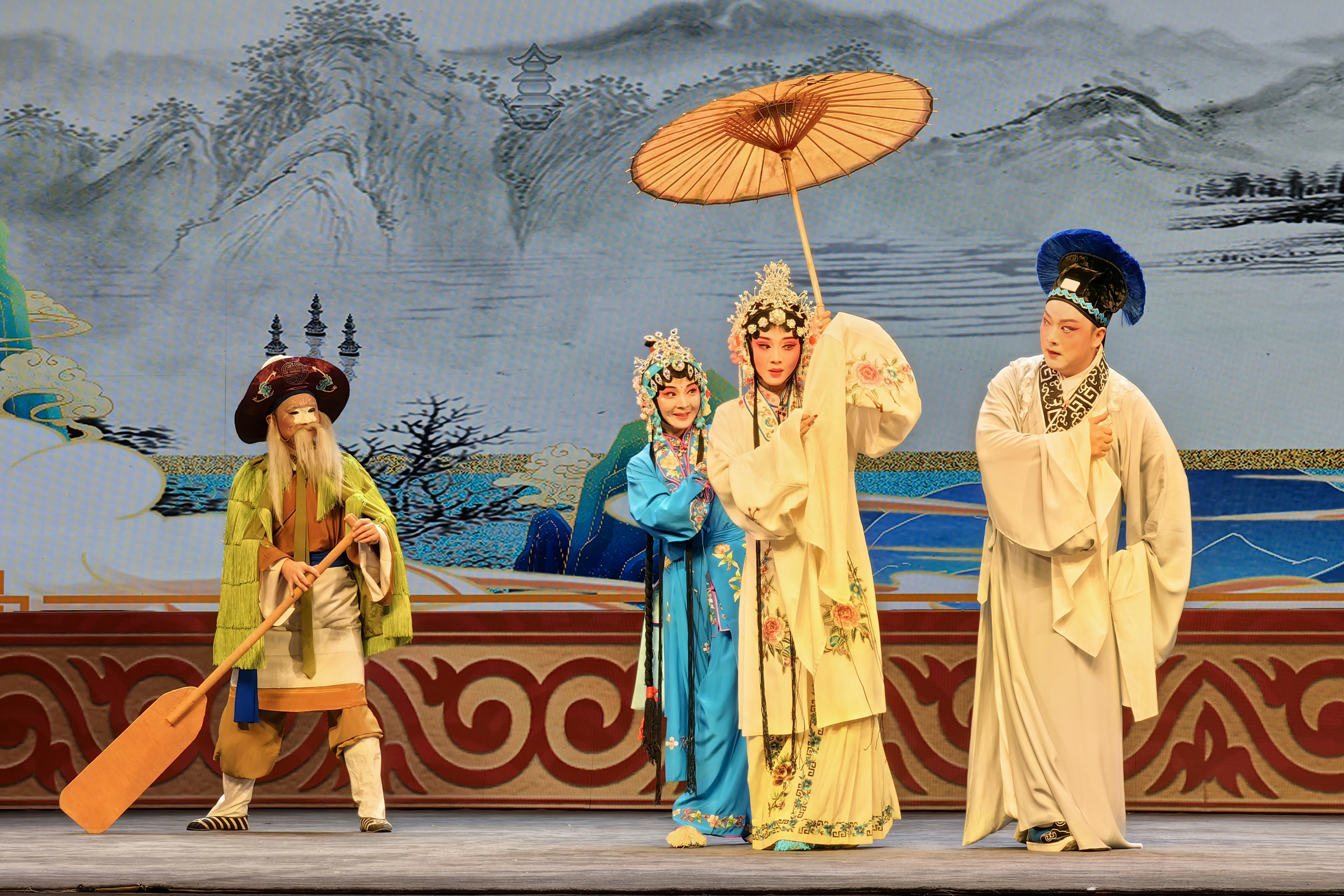
Xu Xian lends Bai Suzhen his umbrella on a ferry boat in West Lake. (Yue opera)

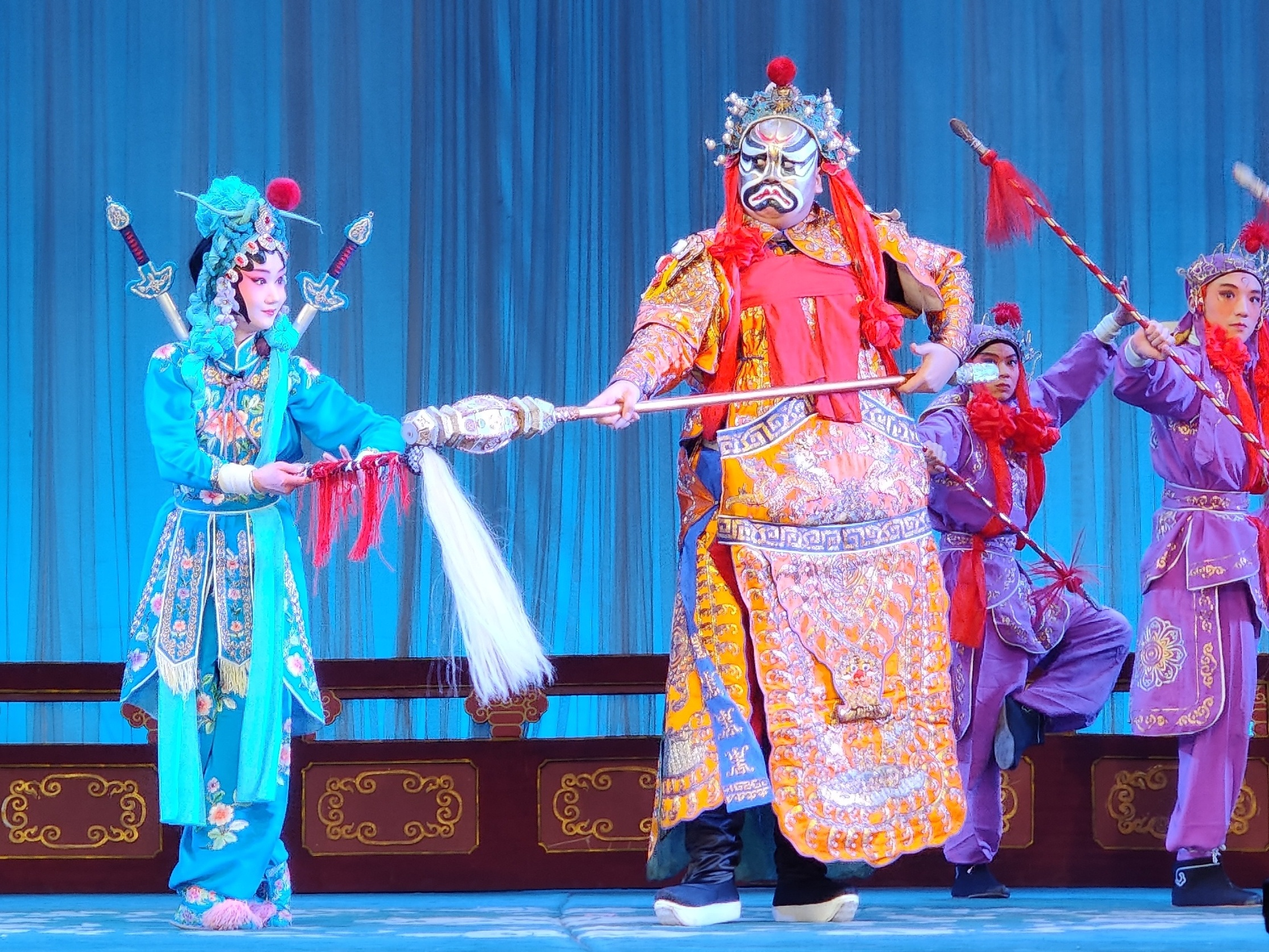
Xiaoqing steals silver from the treasury of a corrupt magistrate to finance Bai Suzhen and Xu Xian's shop. (Hubei Han opera)

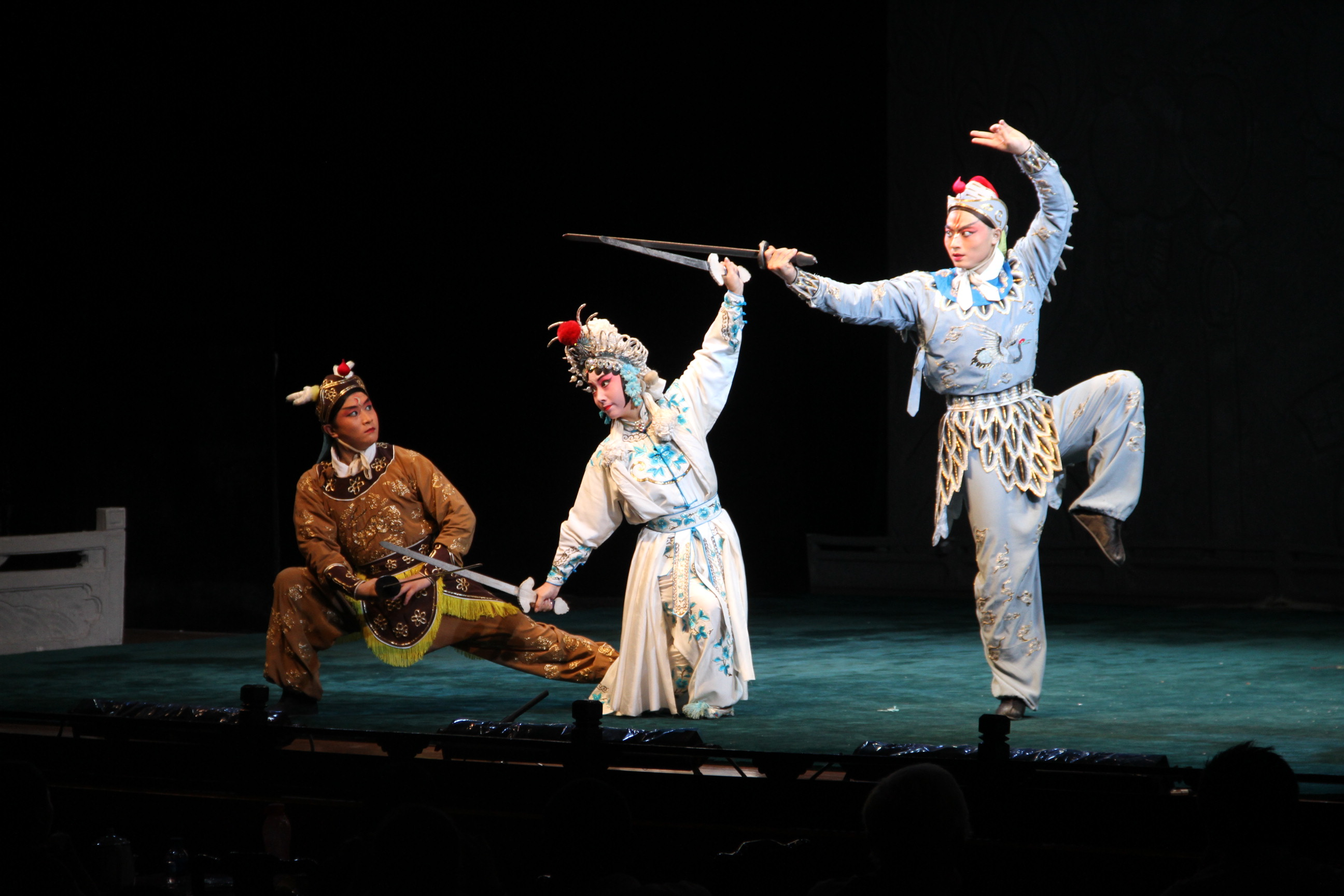
Bai Suzhen battles the guardians of the magical herb. (Peking opera)

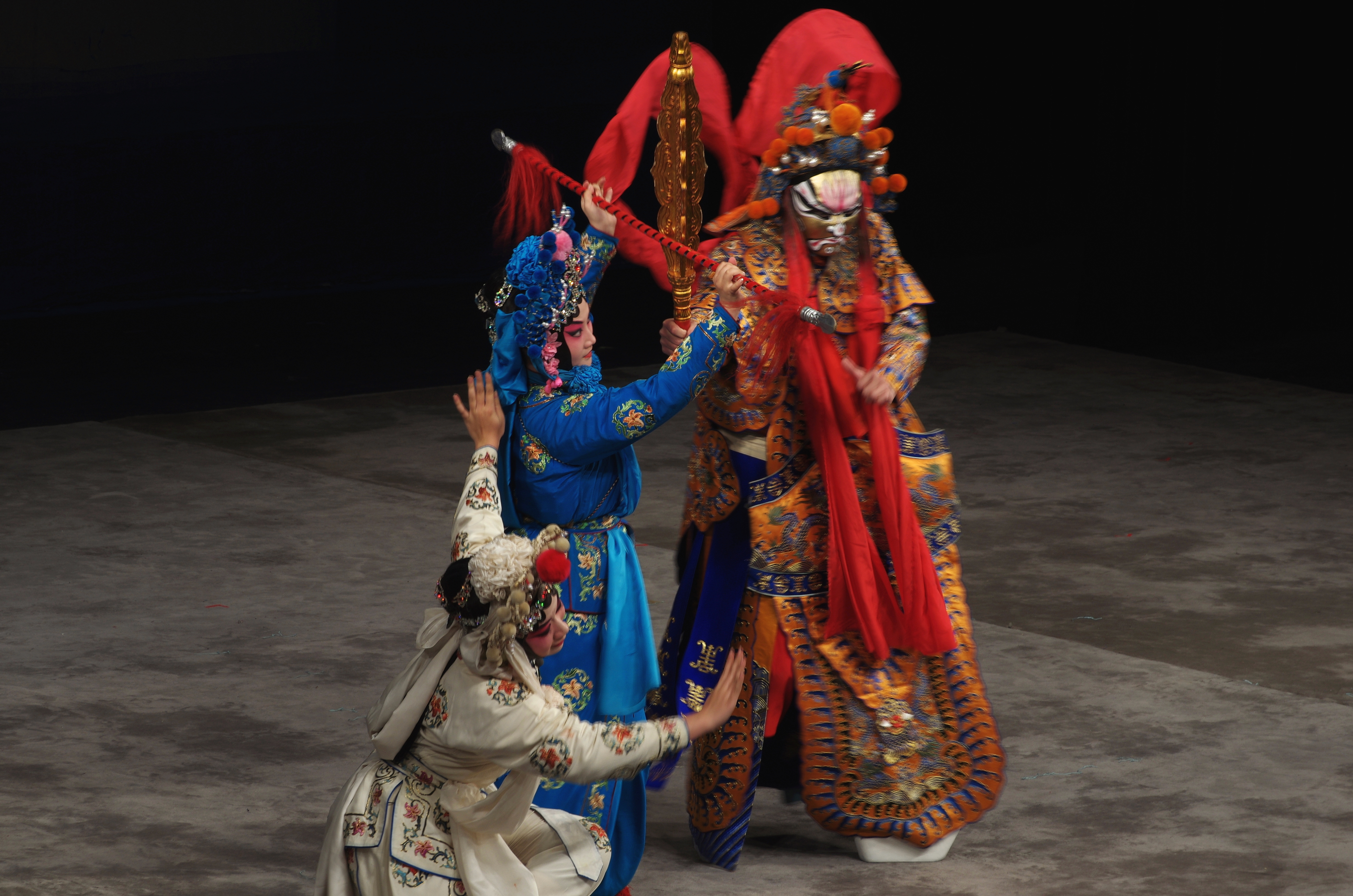
Xiaoqing saves the pregnant Bai Suzhen from Weituo during the Battle of Jinshan Temple. (Kunqu)

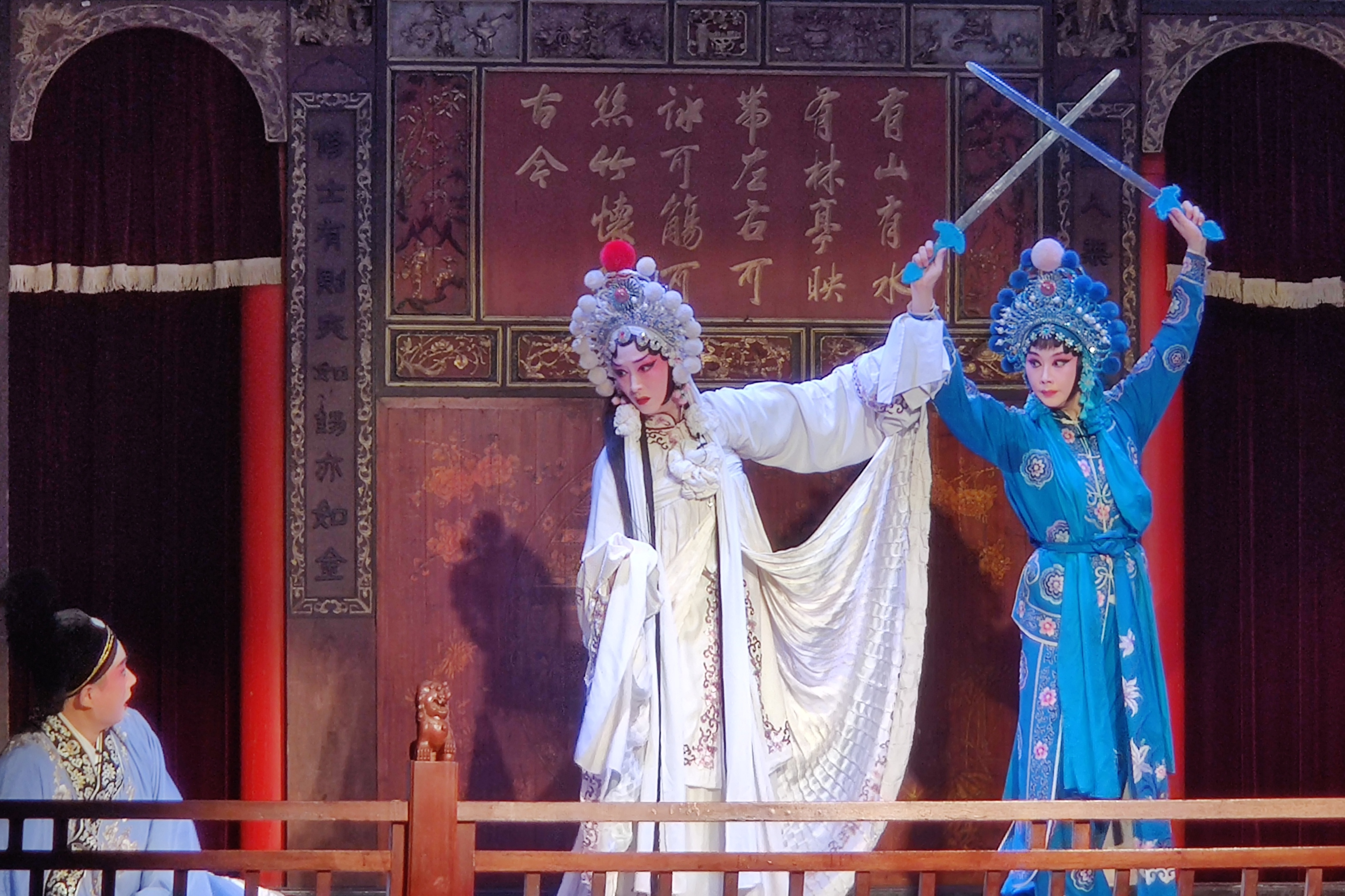
A furious Xiaoqing wants to kill Xu Xian on Broken Bridge, but Bai Suzhen stops her. (Yangzhou opera)

== Plot (Popular Opera Version) ==
The following is a standard version of the story as found in modern Chinese opera:

A white snake and a blue-green snake from Mount Emei transform themselves into two young women called Bai Suzhen and Xiaoqing, respectively. They become best friends and travel to Lin'an Prefecture (or Hangzhou), where they meet a young man named Xu Xian on a ferry-boat in West Lake. Xu Xian lends them his umbrella because it is raining. Xu Xian and Bai Suzhen fall in love instantly and are eventually married. They open a medicine shop.

Fahai, the abbot of Jinshan Temple in Zhenjiang, approaches Xu Xian and tells him that his wife is a snake. Xu Xian brushes him off, so Fahai tells him that he should have her drink realgar wine during the Dragon Boat Festival. Bai Suzhen unsuspectingly drinks the wine and reveals her true form as a large white snake. Xu Xian dies of shock after seeing that his wife is not human.

Bai Suzhen travels to Kunlun, where she braves danger to steal a magical herb (Ganoderma) guarded by disciples of the Old Man of the South Pole. The herb restores Xu Xian to life.

After coming back to life, Xu Xian is still fearful of his wife. He travels alone to Jinshan Temple, where Fahai imprisons him, telling him that he must live in the temple in order to save himself from the snake demons. Bai Suzhen and Xiaoqing fight with Fahai to rescue Xu Xian. During the battle, Fahai calls on guardian deities like Weituo and Qielan to help him. Bai Suzhen uses her powers to flood the temple, causing collateral damage in the process. However, her powers are limited because she is already pregnant with Xu Xian's child, so she fails to save her husband. Xiaoqing helps her escape back to Hangzhou.

Meanwhile, Xu Xian realizes that his wife's love for him is genuine and that he no longer cares if she is a snake. He manages to escape after persuading a sympathetic young monk to release him. When he reunites with his battered wife on Broken Bridge, where they first met, Xiaoqing is so furious at him that she intends to kill him, but Bai Suzhen stops her. Xu Xian expresses his regret, and both Bai Suzhen and Xiaoqing forgive him, Xiaoqing more reluctantly.

Bai Suzhen gives birth to their son, Xu Mengjiao (in some versions Xu Shilin). Fahai tracks them down, defeats Bai Suzhen and imprisons her under Leifeng Pagoda, despite pleadings from Xu Xian. Xiaoqing flees, vowing vengeance.

In some versions, Xiaoqing later returns after mastering fire magic to defeat Fahai and destroy the pagoda, or Bai Suzhen's son grows up to earn the title of top scholar (Zhuangyuan) and pays respects at the pagoda, moving the heavens to release his mother.

== Variations and spin-offs ==
=== Prequel ===
In the story, Lü Dongbin 呂洞賓, a male immortal, disguises himself as a man selling tangyuan (湯圓, sticky rice balls) at the Broken Bridge 斷橋 near the West Lake 西湖 in Hangzhou 杭州. A boy called Xu Xian 許仙 buys some tangyuan from Lü Dongbin without knowing that they are actually immortality balls. He does not feel hungry for the next three days after eating them, so he goes back to ask why. Lü Dongbin laughs and carries Xu Xian to the bridge, where he flips him upside down and causes him to vomit the tangyuan into the lake. [Xu Xian is clearly not ready for immortality yet.]

In the lake, there is a White Snake that has been practicing Taoist magical arts for thousands of years in the hope of becoming an immortal after centuries of training and cultivation. She eats the tangyuan and gains 500 years worth of magical powers. As a result, White Snake and Xu Xian's fates become intertwined. At the same time, there is a terrapin (or tortoise) also training in the lake. He does not manage to consume any of the balls; and so he is very jealous of the White Snake.

One day in the future, the White Snake sees a beggar on the bridge who has caught a Green Snake and wants to dig out the snake's gall and sell it. The White Snake transforms into a woman and buys the Green Snake from the beggar, thus saving the Green Snake's life. The Green Snake becomes grateful to the White Snake, and from then on regards the White Snake as an elder sister.

=== Sequel ===
Eighteen years later, during the Qingming Festival 清明節, the White and Green Snakes transform themselves into two young women called Bai Suzhen 白素貞and Xiaoqing 小青, respectively. They meet Xu Xian at the Broken Bridge in Hangzhou. Bai Suzhen uses her magic to let it rain, and Xu lends them his umbrella. Xu Xian and Bai Suzhen gradually fall in love and are eventually married. They move to Zhenjiang 鎮江, where they open a shop of Chinese herbal medicines. Through the help of Bai Suzhen's knowledge of natural remedies, the herbal business goes very well.

In the meantime, the terrapin has accumulated enough powers to take human form, so he transforms into a Buddhist monk called Fahai 法海. Still angry with Bai Suzhen for getting ahead of him, Fahai plots to break up her relationship with Xu Xian. He approaches Xu Xian and tells him that during the Duanwu Festival 端午節 his wife should drink realgar wine because his wife is not human but a snake. Realgar wine is a traditional Chinese wine associated with Duanwu Festival to repel the evil spirit. Xu is doubtful but he accepts his advice. Bai Suzhen unsuspectingly drinks the wine and reverts to her true form as a large white snake, and Xu Xian dies of shock after seeing that his wife is not human. Heartbroken, Bai Suzhen and Xiaoqing travel to Mount Emei 峨眉山, where they brave danger to steal a magical herb that restores Xu Xian to life.

After coming back to life, Xu Xian still maintains his love for Bai Suzhen despite knowing her true identity. Xu Xian has transformed through his death journey.

Fahai then tries to separate them again by capturing Xu Xian and imprisoning him in Jinshan Temple 金山寺 (Golden Mountain Temple). Bai Suzhen and Xiaoqing fight Fahai to try and rescue Xu Xian. Bai Suzhen uses her powers to flood the temple and in the process, drowns many innocent people. [This is considered the most ancient stratum of the story, an explanation for the frequent flooding of Yellow River.] However, in the tale her powers are limited because she is pregnant with Xu Xian's child, and she believes she has failed to save her husband. However, Xu Xian manages to escape from Jinshan Temple, and reunites with his wife in Hangzhou, where Bai Suzhen gives birth to their son, Xu Mengjiao 許夢蛟. This name, which means “dreaming of dragon” is given because Xu dreams of Jiao/dragon when Bai is pregnant. Fahai then tracks them down again, defeats Bai Suzhen and imprisons her in Leifeng Pagoda 雷峰塔 (Thunder Peak Pagoda).

== Characters ==
Descriptions based on Bai Niangzi Yong Zhen Leifeng Ta with variations noted:

Bai Suzhen / Bai Niangzi (Lady White)
The name "Bai Niangzi" is used in Stories to Caution the World. She is a thousand-year-old white snake demon who transforms into a human. In "Li Huang", she is a widow who eats hearts. In Yiyao Zhuan, she is named "Bai Suzhen". In Leifeng Ta Qizhuan, she calls herself "Bai Zhenniang" and claims to have cultivated for 1800 years in the Qingfeng Cave on Mount Qingcheng.
Xu Xian / Xu Xuan
A young man working in a herbal medicine shop. In Stories to Caution the World, he is named "Xu Xuan". In "The Three Pagodas", the protagonist is "Xi Xuanzan". The name "Xu Xian" appears from the *tanci* Yiyao Zhuan onwards.
Xiao Qing / Qing Qing
In Stories to Caution the World, she is Bai's maid "Qing Qing" and is actually a thousand-year-old green fish spirit from the West Lake. From the play Kanshang Ge... onwards, she becomes "Xiao Qing", a green snake demon aged 800 years. She is portrayed as honest and loyal. In Leifeng Ta Qizhuan, she lived in the abandoned Chou Wang Manor and fought Bai Niangzi before becoming her maid.
Fahai
A Zen master with spiritual powers and abbot of Jinshan Temple. He does not appear in "The Three Pagodas" (replaced by Xi Zhenren). In Baishe Quanzhuan, he is the reincarnation of the toad/terrapin who holds a grudge against the White Snake for stealing the immortality pills.
Xu Shilin / Xu Mengjiao / Xu Menglong
The son of Xu Xian and Bai Suzhen. He appears in Fang Chengpei's version and later novels. His story (saving his mother through filial piety) was added to change the tragic ending of eternal imprisonment.
Hu Meiniang
A character in Baishe Quanzhuan. A thousand-year-old fox spirit from Kunlun who transforms into the likeness of Bai Niangzi to seduce Xu Xian.

== Modifications and alternate versions ==
The legend has been presented in a number of major Chinese operas, films, and television series.

The white snake was simply known as the "White Lady" or "White Maiden" (白娘子) in the original tale in Feng Menglong's Stories to Caution the World. The name "Bai Suzhen" was created in a later era.

Some adaptations of the legend in theater, film, television and other media have made extensive modifications to the original story, including the following:

- The green snake (Xiaoqing) is portrayed as a treacherous antagonist who betrays the white snake, as opposed to the traditional depiction of her as the white snake's close friend and confidante.
- Alternatively, the green snake (Xiaoqing) is less evolved, less well-trained compared to the white snake (Bai Suzhen), and thus less cognisant of what it means to be human. She is more animalistic and therefore sometimes at odds with Bai Suzhen, thus explaining their differences both in character and actions.
- Fahai is portrayed in a more sympathetic light as opposed to the traditional depiction of him as a vindictive and jealous villain: rigid and authoritarian, yet well-intentioned. His background story is also different in some adaptations.
- Bai Suzhen is freed from Leifeng Pagoda because her son's filial piety moved Heaven.
- A retcon or revisionist version of the story relates that Xu Xian and Bai Suzhen were actually immortals who fell in love and were banished from Heaven because celestial laws forbade their romance. They are reincarnated as a male human and a female white snake spirit respectively and their story begins.

== Adaptations ==
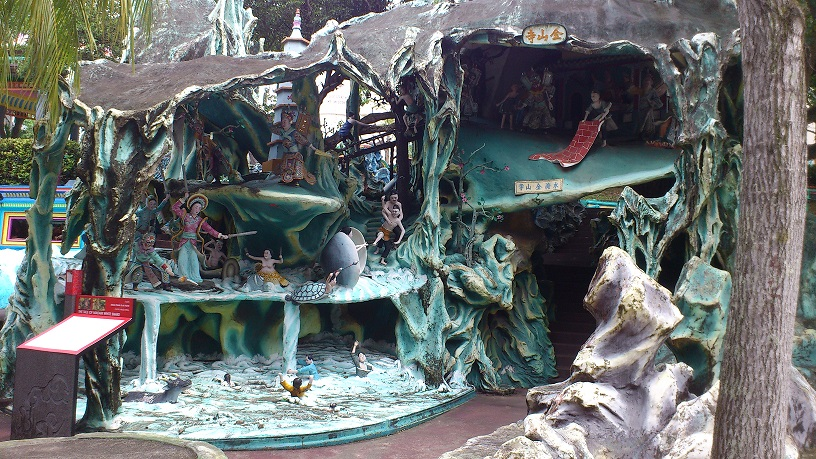
Diorama at Haw Par Villa, Singapore, depicting the battle between Bai Suzhen and Fahai.

== See also ==
- Chinese mythology
- Duanwu Festival
- Leifeng Pagoda
- Melusine
- Snakes in Chinese mythology

== References and further reading ==
- Idema, Wilt L. (2009). The White Snake and Her Son: A Translation of the Precious Scroll of Thunder Peak with Related Texts. Hackett Publishing. ISBN 9781603843751.
- —— (2012). "Old Tales for New Times: Some Comments on the Cultural Translation of China's Four Great Folktales in the Twentieth Century 二十世紀中國四大民間故事的文化翻譯" (PDF). Taiwan Journal of East Asian Studies. 9 (1): 25–46. Archived from the original (PDF) on October 6, 2014.
- Mao, Xian (2013). Cowherd and Weaver and other most popular love legends in China. eBook: Kindle Direct Publishing.
- Wakaba Nakata (2008). "On the Creation of Characters in 'The Lust of the White Serpent' and the Influence of Chinese Vernacular Fiction". Toyo Law Review. 51 (2): 89–120.
- Yasuki Abe (1995). "The Development of the 'Legend of the White Snake': From Ghost Story to Repayment of Kindness". History and Culture of Asia. 2: 1–19.
- Ko Kawada (2014). "Modern Gestation Seen in 'Legend of the White Snake'". Kyoto Gakuen University Faculty of Economics Review. 23 (2): 35–57.
