= Jinshan Temple (Zhenjiang) =

Buddhist temple in Jiangsu, China

- 金山寺
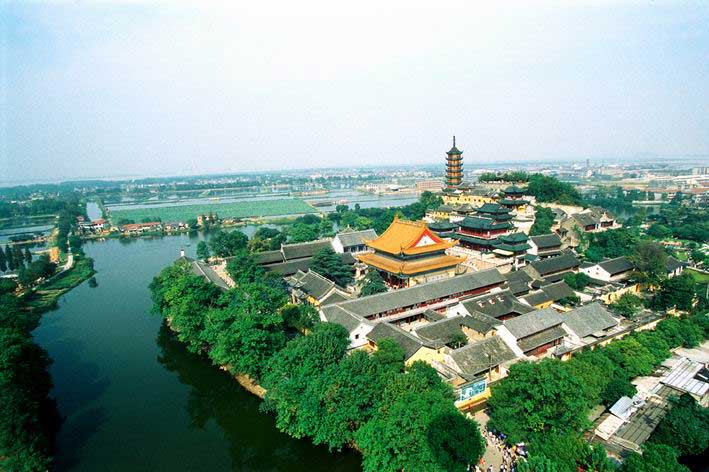
- A commanding view of Jinshan Temple.

- Location within Jiangsu

Religion
- Affiliation: Buddhism
- Sect: Chan Buddhism

Location
- Location: Runzhou District, Zhenjiang, Jiangsu
- Country: China
- Interactive map of Jinshan Temple
- Coordinates: 32°13′32″N 119°25′19″E

Architecture
- Style: Chinese architecture
- Founder: Emperor Ming of Jin
- Established: 323–325
- Completed: 1990 (reconstruction)

Jinshan Temple (Chinese: 金山寺; pinyin: Jīnshān Sì) is a Buddhist temple located in Runzhou District of Zhenjiang, Jiangsu, China.

== History ==
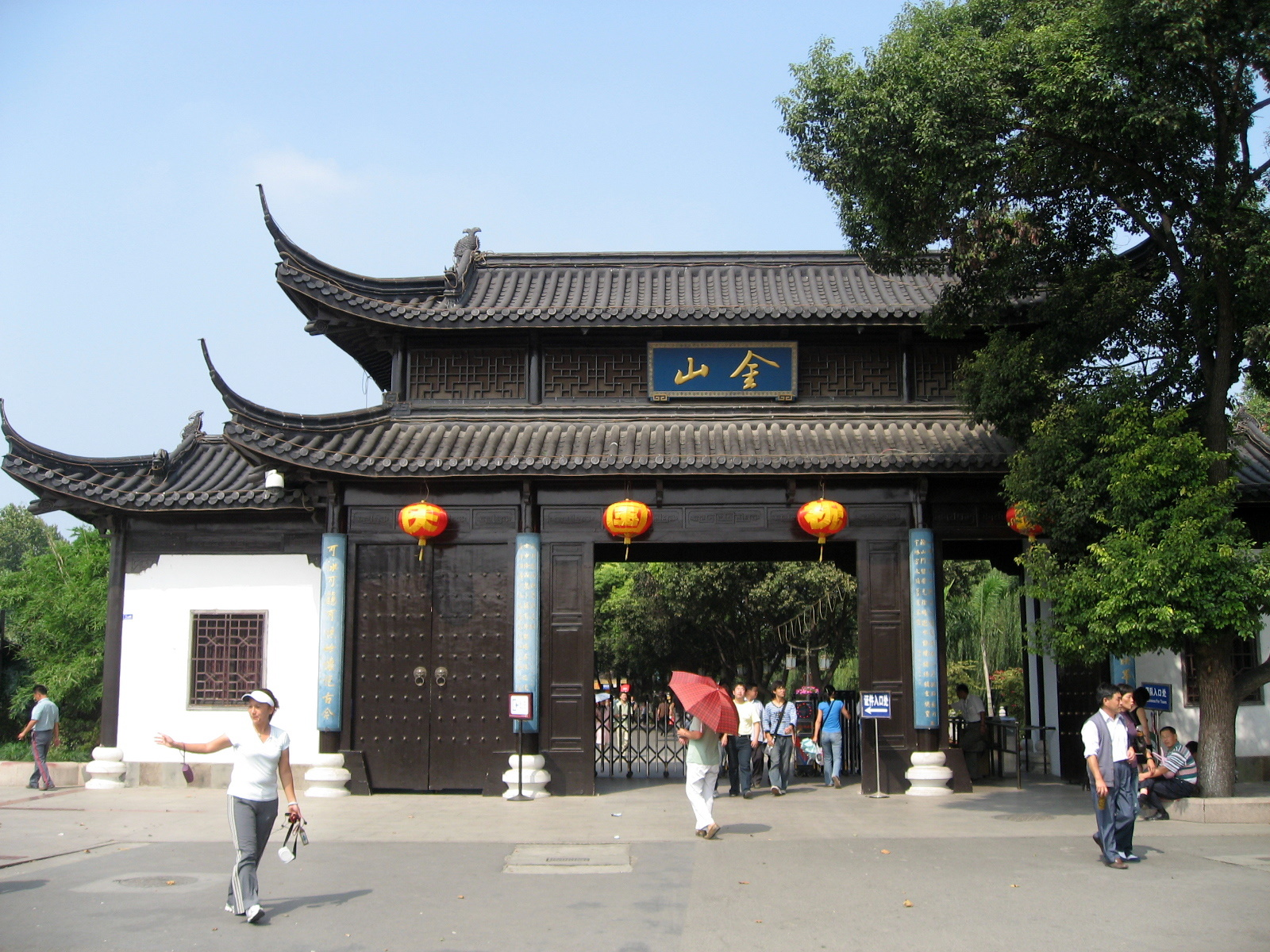
Entrance of Jinshan Temple.

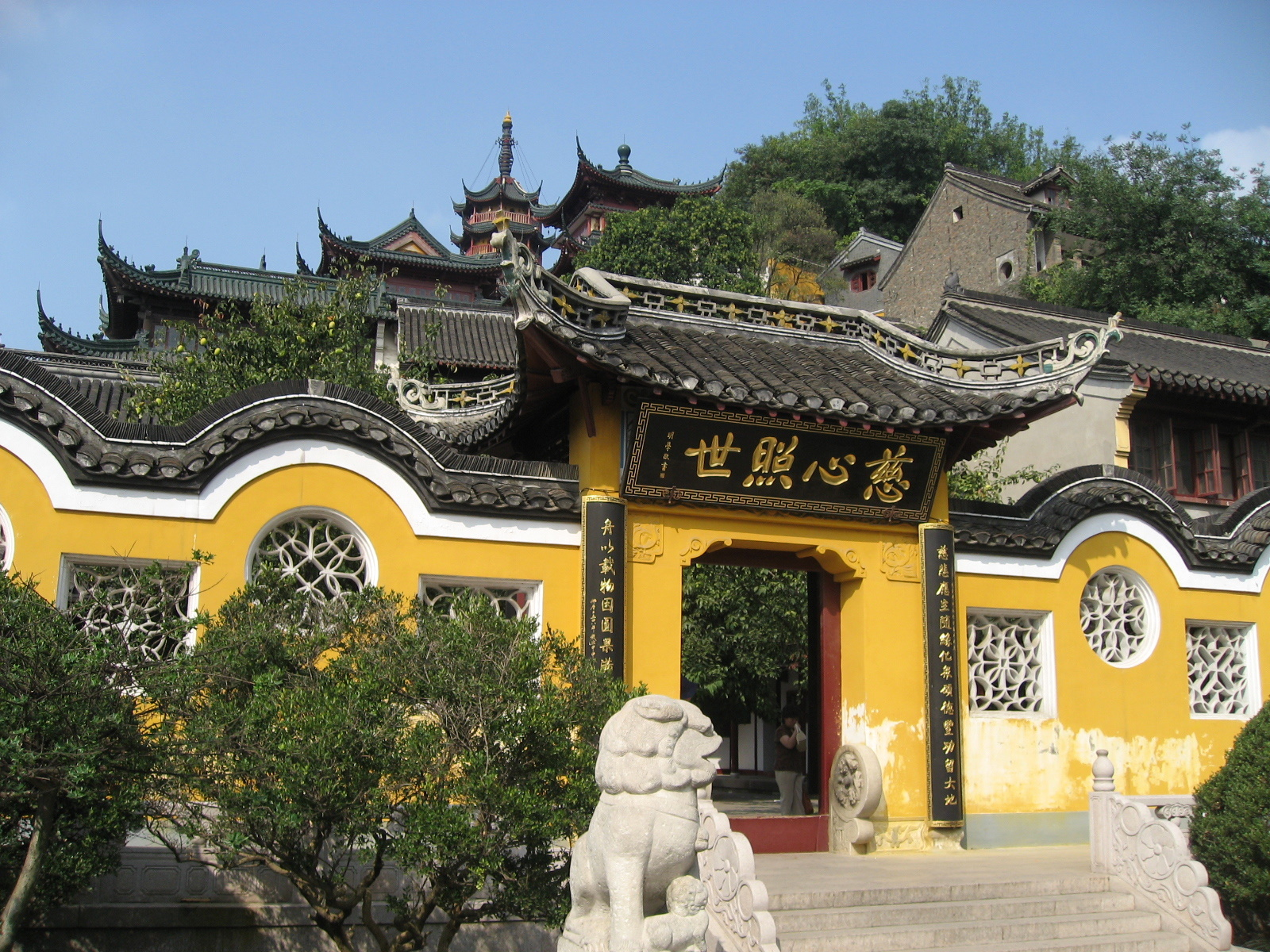
Jinshan Temple.

=== Eastern Jin dynasty ===
The temple was first established as "Zexin Temple" (澤心寺) by Emperor Ming of Jin between 323 and 325, in the Eastern Jin dynasty (317–420).

=== Song dynasty ===
During the reign of Emperor Zhenzong (998–1022), the emperor renamed it "Longyou Temple" (龙游寺; Long means the emperor and You means visit) after he dreamt he visited the temple. Then it was largely extended by abbot Foyin in the Yuanfeng period (1078–1085). Since Emperor Huizong (1101–1125) was a staunch Taoist, he ordered to convert many Buddhist temples into Taoist temples, the Temple became a Taoist temple and renamed "Shenxiao Yuqing Wanshou Palace" (神霄玉清万寿宫). After the fall of the Northern Song dynasty (960–1127), it restored the name of "Longyou Temple".

Foyin (佛印), an accomplished monk and friend of Su Shi, settled at Jinshan Temple.

=== Yuan dynasty ===
The temple changed the name into "Jinshan Temple" (金山寺) in the Yuan dynasty.

=== Qing dynasty ===
In 1684, Kangxi Emperor made an inspection trip in the south, when he visited Jinshan Temple, he inscribed the plaque with the Chinese characters "Jiangtian Chan Temple" (江天禅寺).

In the 18th century, French geographer Georges-Louis Le Rouge visited the temple and painted some prints in Chinese Ancient Gardens.

=== Republic of China ===
In 1948, during the Chinese Civil War, a disastrous fire destroyed more than 200 buildings, including the Mahavira Hall, Buddhist Texts Library and abbot's room.

=== People's Republic of China ===
In 1966, Mao Zedong launched the ten-year devastating Cultural Revolution and the red guards attacked and vandalised the temple. Many of the temple's stupas were destroyed and the resident monks were forced to disrobe. Some of the monks who refused to disrobe were forced to work in the farm as labourers for nearly twenty years.

Jinshan Temple has been classified as a National Key Buddhist Temple in Han Chinese Area by the State Council of China in 1983.

== Architecture ==
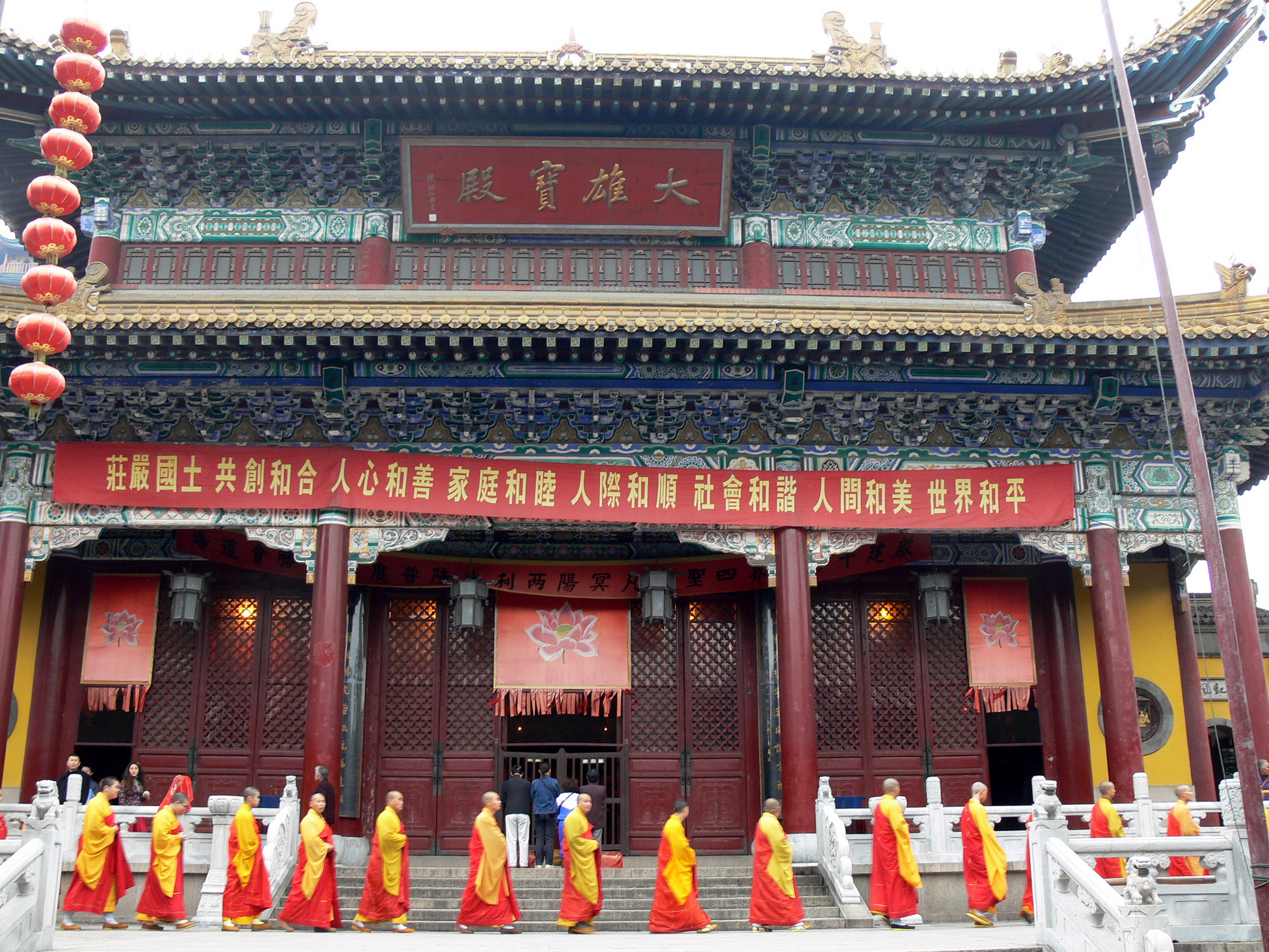
The Mahavira Hall, rebuilt in 1990.

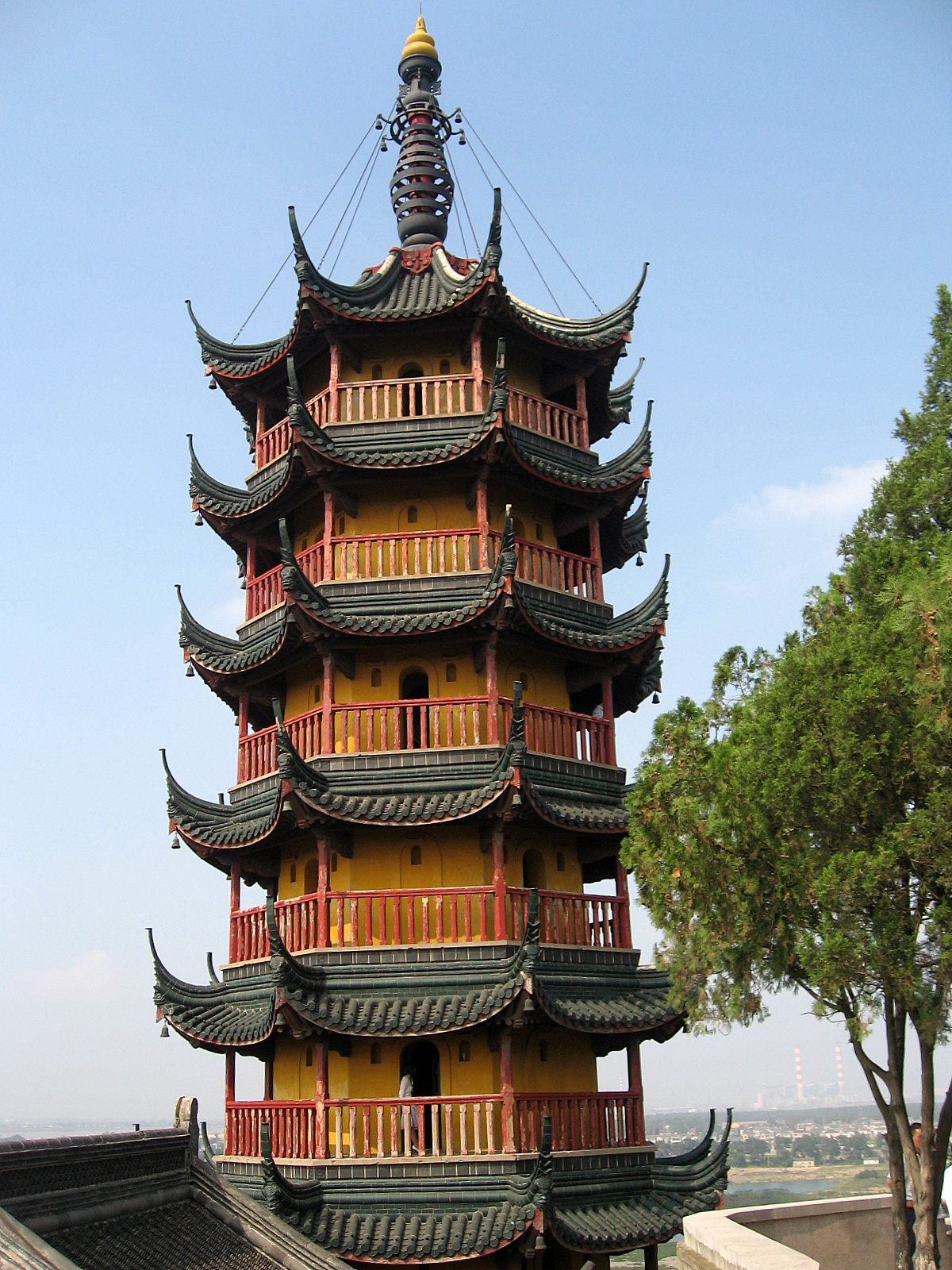
Cishou Pagoda.

The entire complex faces the west and has an exquisite layout in the order of the Shanmen, Four Heavenly Kings Hall, Mahavira Hall, Hall of Guru, Furong Tower, Qifeng Pavilion, and Cishou Pagoda.

=== Tianwang Dian ===
The Tianwang Dian was first built in the Zhengtong period (1436–1449) of the Ming dynasty (1368–1644) and rebuilt in 1869 in the Tongzhi era (1862–1874) of the Qing dynasty (1644–1911). The statues of Maitreya Buddha, Skanda and Four Heavenly Kings are enshrined in the hall.

=== Mahavira Hall ===
The Mahavira Hall is rebuilt in 1989 with double-eaves gable and hip roof. The hall enshrining the statues of Three Life Buddha, namely Sakyamuni, Amitabha and Bhaisajyaguru. At the back the hall enshrines the statue of Guanyin with Shancai standing on the left and Longnü on the right. The statues of Eighteen Arhats stand on both sides of the hall. In the center of the eaves of the hall is a plaque, on which there are the words "Mahavira Hall" written by former Venerable Master of the Buddhist Association of China Zhao Puchu.

=== Furong Tower ===
The 19-metre (62 ft) Furong Tower is divided into upper and lower story with double-eaves gable and hip roof. Under the eaves is a plaque with the Chinese characters "Furong Tower" written by former Chinese President and General Secretary of the Communist Party Jiang Zemin.

=== Cishou Pagoda ===
The 36-metre (118 ft) pagoda is octagonal with seven stories. It was originally built in the Southern Dynasties (420–589) and refurbished in the Yuanfu period (1098–1100) of the Song dynasty (960–1279). The present pagoda was rebuilt in 1900, in the 26th year of Guangxu period (1875–1908) of the Qing dynasty (1644–1911).

=== Zangjing Ge ===
The Zangjing Ge was burned down in 1948. The present version was completed in 1984 with gable and hip roof. The 21-metre (69 ft) high hall has four stories and occupies an area of 1,200 square metres (13,000 sq ft).
