= Fahai (character) =

- Legend of the White Snake character
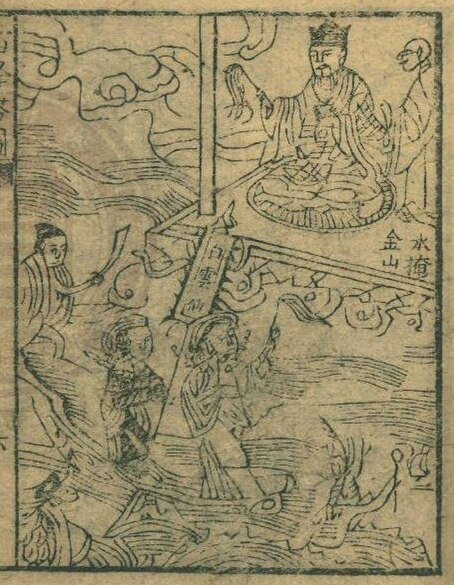
- Fahai's (seated) battle against the snakes Bai Suzhen and Xiaoqing as the Jinshan Temple gets flooded. Illustration from a 1806 print of a novel based on the legend.

In-universe information
- Species: Human
- Gender: Male
- Occupation: Abbot of Jinshan Temple; Demon hunter
- Religion: Buddhism
- Nationality: Song China

Fahai (Chinese: 法海) is a fictional Buddhist monk and a major character of the Legend of the White Snake, one of China's "four great folktales". Serving as the abbot of Zhenjiang's Jinshan Temple, Fahai possesses magic powers (such as the ability to call on protective deities of Buddhism) and he is determined to destroy the marriage between the snake Bai Suzhen and her mortal husband Xu Xian. Following a fierce battle against Bai Suzhen and her companion Xiaoqing, which resulted in the flooding of Jinshan Temple, Fahai successfully entraps Bai Suzhen under the Leifeng Pagoda in Hangzhou.

In the Ming-dynasty version of the legend, contained in Stories to Caution the World (1624) compiled by Feng Menglong, Fahai is depicted positively as a righteous and heroic demon-slayer, and Xu Xuan (Xu Xian's earlier version) even becomes his disciple. However, as audiences increasingly empathized with the devoted wife Bai Suzhen, Fahai's characterization turned more and more negative, especially in the 20th century with the movements of free love, environmentalism, feminism, and secularism. Today, Fahai is commonly perceived as a religious zealot and a heartless, narrow-minded hypocrite who wrecks families under the guise of compassion and righteousness, and casts Buddhist monks in a bad light.
