= Xu Xian =

Character in Chinese mythology

- Legend of the White Snake character
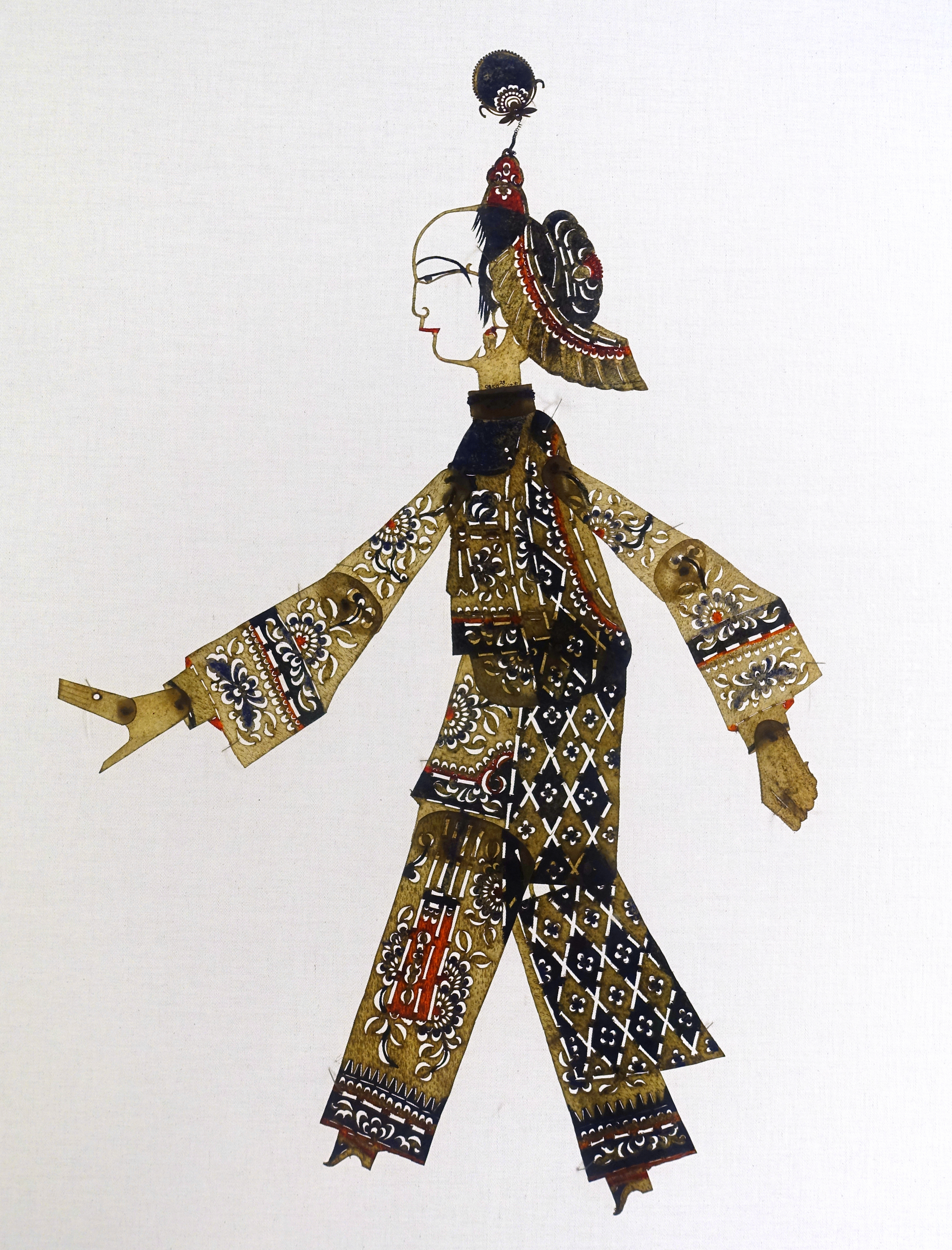
- A shadow puppet from the Qing dynasty depicting Xu Xian

In-universe information
- Species: Human
- Gender: Male
- Occupation: Traditional Chinese medicine practitioner
- Spouse: Bai Suzhen
- Children: Xu Shilin (son)
- Relatives: A sister
- Home: Lin'an Prefecture (modern Hangzhou)
- Nationality: Song China

Xu Xian
- Traditional Chinese: 許仙
- Simplified Chinese: 许仙
Transcriptions
Standard Mandarin
- Hanyu Pinyin: Xǔ Xiān
- Wade–Giles: Hsü^{3} Hsien^{1}
Yue: Cantonese
- Yale Romanization: Héui Sīn
- Jyutping: Heoi^{2} Sin^{1}

Xu Xuan
- Traditional Chinese: 許宣
- Simplified Chinese: 许宣
Transcriptions
Standard Mandarin
- Hanyu Pinyin: Xǔ Xuān
- Wade–Giles: Hsü^{3} Hsüan^{1}
Yue: Cantonese
- Yale Romanization: Héui Syūn
- Jyutping: Heoi^{2} Syun^{1}

Xu Xian (Chinese: 許仙), courtesy name Hanwen (漢文), is a main character of the Legend of the White Snake, one of China's four great folk tales. In some versions of the legend he is a scholar, while in others he is a physician. In earlier works such as Feng Menglong's Stories to Caution the World, he is known as Xu Xuan (Chinese: 許宣).

== Legend ==
Some legends say that Xu Xian and Bai Suzhen were actually immortals who fell in love and were banished from Heaven because celestial laws forbade their romance. They are reincarnated as a male human and a white snake spirit who lived in the mountains and take a human form after a thousand years. Respectively, their story begins. In an alternative version of the story, Bai Suzhen takes on a beautiful woman form to search for Xu Xian, who had saved her life in a past life. She feels indebted to him and wants to repay the favor by helping him in his life.

In the main story, one day, Xu Xian unwittingly buys some tangyuan from Lü Dongbin, who has concealed his identity as a tangyuan vendor near the Broken Bridge by West Lake in Hangzhou. Little does Xu Xian realize that these tangyuan are, in reality, immortality pills. After ingesting them, he remains without hunger for the next three days, compelling him to seek out the vendor for an explanation. Lü Dongbin, with a hearty laugh, leads Xu Xian to the bridge, where he playfully turns him upside down, causing him to vomit the tangyuan into the lake. Beneath the water's surface resides a white snake spirit well-versed in Taoist magical arts. She consumes the expelled pills and gains a magical power boost equivalent to 500 years of practice. In gratitude, she feels a deep connection with Xu Xian, and their destinies become intertwined.

Other versions of the story describe him as a Confucian human with no supernatural abilities whatsoever, rather than as an immortal like his name (Xian) implies.

During the Qingming Festival, he coincidentally met Bai Suzhen at the Broken Bridge, and he eventually marries her. They have a child together but, their happiness is short-lived when a Buddhist abbot Fahai discovers her true origin, and exposes Bai Suzhen to be a snake. Xu Xian is mortified to find his wife has been a snake, and dies of a heart attack. Bai Suzhen finds the cure to revive Xu Xian at Mount Emei. After she revives him, Xu Xian confesses that he still loves Bai Suzhen. Bai Suzhen then fights for both her marriage and her freedom. At last, Fahai tracks them down, defeats Bai Suzhen and imprisons her in Leifeng Pagoda. Xu Xian then spends decades of his life trying to free her, and upon failure becomes monk to stay at the temple, waiting for his wife. He grows old and eventually dies. Their son finds a way to free her. He destroys the Leifeng Pagoda, and she is released. Bai Suzhen is heart broken to learn that her husband has died, but lives with their son. Fahai is punished severely by the gods for not recognizing good and bad.
