= Zhuangyuan =

Best graduate of the Chinese Imperial examinations

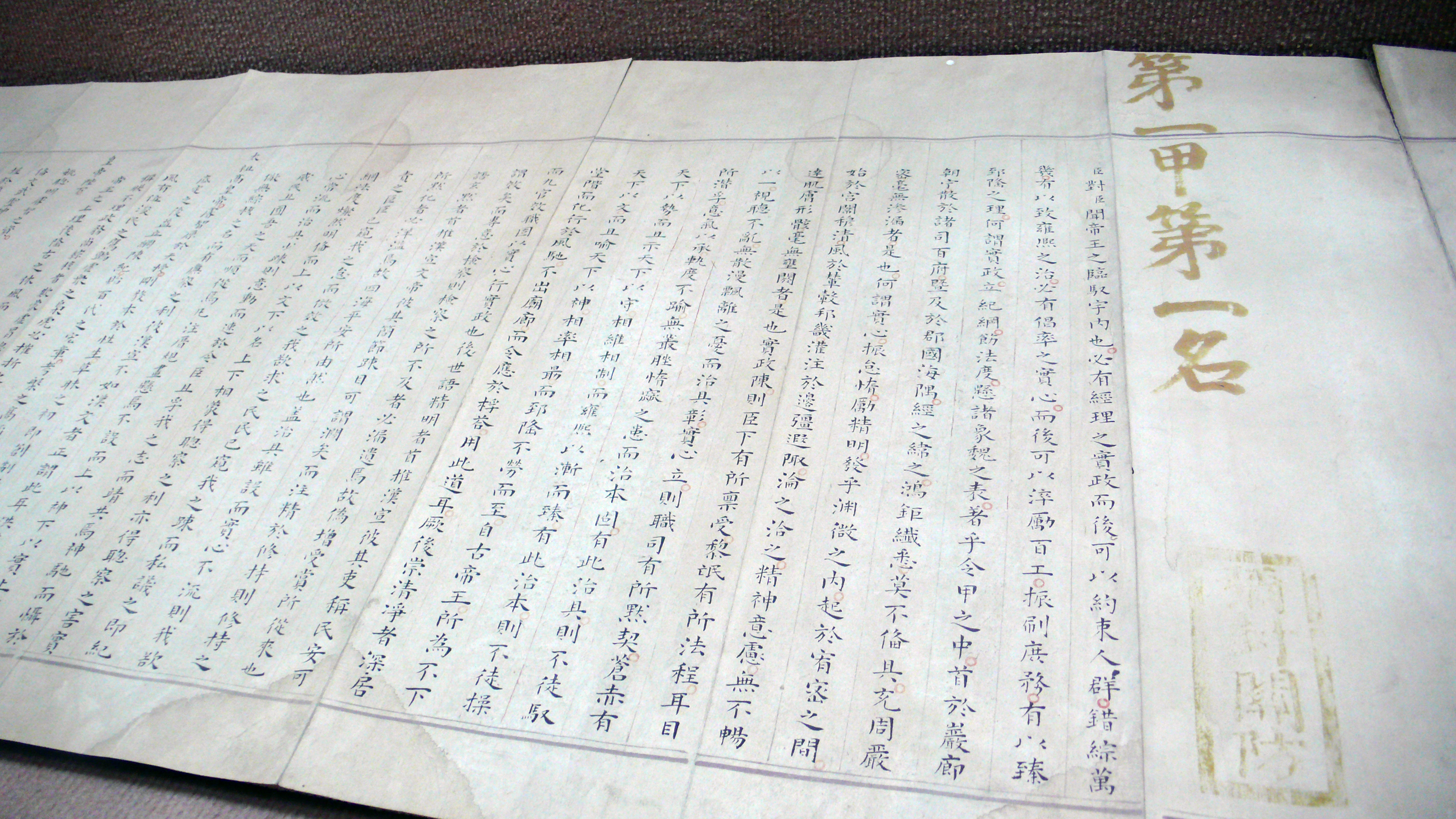
- Imperial exam paper of Ming dynasty Zhuangyuan Zhao Bingzhong in 1598 AD

Chinese name
- Traditional Chinese: 狀元
- Simplified Chinese: 状元
- Hanyu Pinyin: zhuàngyuán
Transcriptions
Standard Mandarin
- Hanyu Pinyin: zhuàngyuán
- Wade–Giles: chuang-yüan
- IPA: [ʈʂwâŋ.yǎn]

Vietnamese name
- Vietnamese alphabet: trạng nguyên
- Chữ Hán: 狀元

Korean name
- Hangul: 장원
- Hanja: 狀元

Zhuangyuan, or jangwon in Korean and trạng nguyên in Vietnamese, variously translated into English as principal graduate, primus, or optimus, was the title given to the scholar who achieved the highest score on highest level of the Imperial examination, Metropolitan examination (in the Tang dynasty) and Palace examination (in the Song dynasty) in imperial China, Gwageo examinations in Goryeo and Joseon era Korea, and Vietnam.

In China, Fu Shanxiang is known as the first (and last) female zhuangyuan (nü zhuangyuan) in Chinese history, but under the Taiping Heavenly Kingdom, not the regular imperial exams. After the Taipings captured the city of Nanjing, they offered an exam for women in January 1853 in which Fu attained the highest score.

In Vietnam, the first de facto trạng nguyên was Lê Văn Thịnh, a Lý dynasty scholar. He was the chief negotiator who persuaded the Song to return the 6 districts of Quảng Nguyên (today Hà Giang province) to Vietnam. Nevertheless, the first Vietnamese person to be trạng nguyên was in fact Khương Công Phụ under Chinese Tang Dynasty. The first female trạng nguyên (nữ trạng nguyên) was Nguyễn Thị Duệ, who later become a consort of the Mạc Emperor Mạc Kính Cung. She had previously been a consort of the Lê Emperor Lê Thần Tông, and would serve as an official in the Revival Lê dynasty after the fall of the Mạc dynasty. Under Nguyễn Dynasty, the title trạng nguyên was not officially abolished, yet its standards were so high that it was virtually unachievable.

== In China ==
In total, there were 596 zhuangyuan in ancient China.

=== Noteworthy zhuangyuan ===
- Guo Ziyi, (697–781), a famous Tang dynasty general.
- Sun Fujia, (?-658), Tang dynasty dali qing (chamberlain of the Court of Judicial Review), highly regarded for his candid advice to Gaozu and Taizong, the first zhuangyuan in history.
- Xue Yi, (1037–1082), the only military zhuangyuan who was killed on the battlefield in Chinese history.
- Zhang Heng (zh:章衡), (1025–1099), a prominent Song dynasty official.
- Chen Wenlong, (1232–1277), a prominent Song dynasty scholar-general.
- Wen Tianxiang, (1236–1283), a scholar-general in the last years of the Southern Song dynasty. For his resistance to Kublai Khan's invasion of the Song, and for his refusal to yield to the Yuan dynasty despite being captured and tortured.
- Mo Xuanqing, (834–868), the youngest zhuangyuan in the imperial examinations during the Tang dynasty.
- Chen An (zh:陳䢿), (1362–1397), the only zhuangyuan to be put to death by the emperor in Chinese history.
- Tang Gao, became the Zhuangyuan in the ninth year (1514) of the Zhengde Emperor's reign during the Ming dynasty.
- Zhao Bingzhong, the only zhuangyuan with his examination paper kept until now.
- Yu Minzhong, who served as chief grand councilor for part of the reign of the Qianlong Emperor of Qing dynasty.
- Hong Jun.
- Weng Tonghe.
- Lin Hongnian, (1805–1885).
- Fu Shanxiang, Taiping Heavenly Kingdom, the first and only woman to become a zhuangyuan.
- Zhang Sanjia (1876–1898), the last military zhuangyuan in Chinese history.
- Lu Chunlin (1872–1942), the last zhuangyuan in Chinese history.
- Xu Shilin, a mythological figure who attained the Zhuangyuan, demonstrated great filial piety to his mother, Bai Suzhen, a white snake spirit imprisoned under Leifeng Pagoda.

== In Vietnam ==
In total, there were 56 trạng nguyên in ancient Vietnam.

=== Noteworthy Trạng nguyên ===
- Lê Văn Thịnh (黎文盛, 1038 – 1096), the first de facto trạng nguyên of Vietnam's independent era.
- Huyền Quang(玄光, 1254–1334), real name Lý Tải Đạo, a politician and later Buddhist monk who lived during the reign of Emperor Trần Nhân Tông during the Trần dynasty. He was considered to be equal with the first six patriarchs of the Zen Buddhist tradition.
- Nguyễn Hiền (阮賢, 1234–1256), the youngest to become a trạng nguyên at 13 years old, later died at 21 years old. He also many times become an envoy to meet the Yuan dynasty
- Mạc Đĩnh Chi (莫挺之,1272–1346) a scholar and envoy who served three emperors of the Trần dynasty, as well as the ancestor of the emperor Mạc Thái Tổ.
- Nguyễn Trực (阮直, 1417–1474), the first trạng nguyên of Later Lê dynasty
- Phạm Đôn Lễ (范敦禮, 1457–1531), also known as "Trạng Chiếu" (trạng of segde mats).
- Lương Thế Vinh (梁世榮, 1441–1496) a mathematician, Buddhist and poet who lived during Lê Thánh Tông's reign.
- Nguyễn Bỉnh Khiêm (阮秉謙, 1491–1585) a trạng nguyên under Mạc dynasty, known for the ability to predict future.
- Nguyễn Thị Duệ (阮氏叡, 1574–1654), the first and only female trạng nguyên.
- Nguyễn Đăng Đạo (阮登道, 1651–1719), a tể tướng (Grand Chancellor) under Later Lê Dynasty.
- Trịnh Tuệ (鄭橞; 1701–?), the last person to achieve the title trạng nguyên.
- Phan Đình Phùng (潘廷逢, 1847–1896), a revolutionary against French colonialism.
- Nguyễn Phong Di (阮豐貽, 1889–?), the last de facto trạng nguyên of Vietnam.

== In modern culture ==
In modern Chinese, zhuangyuan is used to refer to anyone who achieves the highest mark on a test, or, more generally, to anyone who is at the forefront of his or her field. In mainland China, the term is most often used to refer to the highest score at the provincial level for either the social sciences (文科) or physical sciences (理科) track of the annual gaokao college entrance exam.

== See also ==
- Imperial examination
- Confucian court examination system in Vietnam
- Gwageo
- Jinshi (imperial examination)
- Bangyan (Bảng nhãn, 榜眼)
- Valedictorian
