= Hà Ngại =

Nguyễn dynasty official (1890–1976)

- 何艾
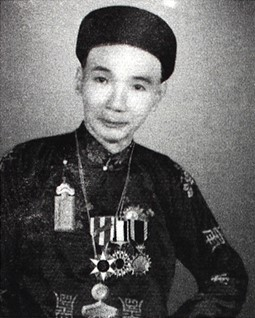

Personal details
- Born: 1890 Phú Quý Commune, Diên Phúc District, Quảng Nam Province
- Died: 1976 (aged 85–86)

Hà Ngại (Note: In the book Quốc triều Hương khoa lục published by Lao Động Press in 2011 (the original book was written in Classical Chinese), his name is transliterated into chữ Quốc ngữ as Hà Ngải by the translator.) (Vietnamese: Hà Ngại / 何艾, 1890 – 1976) was an official in the Nguyễn dynasty, Vietnam.

== History ==
Ngại was born in 1890 in Phú Quý Commune, Diên Phúc District, Quảng Nam Province (now part of Điện Quang Commune, Điện Bàn Town, Quảng Nam Province). His grandfather received the title of "tú tài" in the examinations three times and later took part in the Cần Vương movement.

In 1912, at the age of 21, Ngại passed the Imperial examination at the Thừa Thiên Examination Field and received the rank of Cử nhân. After that, Ngại enrolled in Hậu Bổ school of Huế and where he met Ngô Đình Diệm, the future President of the Republic of Vietnam. After graduating Ngại served in Bình Định, Thanh Hóa, Quảng Trị, Bình Thuận, Thừa Thiên, Hà Tĩnh, and Nghệ An provinces.

In 1945, Ngại was appointed as the Quản đạo (equivalent to a provincial chief) of Kon Tum, and in August, when the revolution broke out in Kon Tum, as in other parts of Vietnam, Ngại handed over the regime to the revolutionary government and returned to his hometown.

After living in his hometown for some time, Ngại moved to Huế to teach Chinese literature and then to Saigon to live with his eldest son, before he died in 1976.

== Writings ==
- Memoir Khúc tiêu đồng
