= Fu Shanxiang =

Qing dynasty politician

- 傅善祥

Chancelloress of the East Kingdom of the Taiping Heavenly Kingdom
- In office 1851–1864
- Monarch: Yang Xiuqing (East King)
- Preceded by: Office created
- Succeeded by: Office abolished

Personal details
- Born: 1833 Nanjing, Jiangsu, China
- Died: 1864 (aged 30–31) Nanjing, Jiangsu, China

Fu Shanxiang (Chinese: 傅善祥; 1833 – 1864) was a Chinese scholar from Nanjing who became Chancellor under the Taiping Heavenly Kingdom, a rebel Chinese state opposed to the Qing dynasty in the 1850s. Fu is known as the first (and only) female Zhuangyuan in Chinese history (though her examinations were under the Taiping Heavenly Kingdom, not the Qing dynasty).

== Career ==
The historical record on Fu Shanxiang is brief and unclear, but scholars agree on the outlines. She was a daughter of the scholar Fu Qizheng, a native of Nanjing, who was orphaned at an early age. The rebel armies of the Taiping Heavenly Kingdom took control of the city in 1853, and proclaimed revolutionary social policies, including equality for women. They arranged the first examinations for women in the history of China. The exam was held on January 13, 1853, the birthday of the Taiping Heavenly King, Hong Xiuquan. Fu achieved the highest score, earning her the title Zhuangyuan, the first and only time in Chinese history that the honor had been earned by a woman. After her success, no more examinations for women were held.

Fu was appointed Chancelloress in the court of Yang Xiuqing, the East King (Dong Wang), where she dealt with correspondence and official papers. Since Yang was illiterate, having been orphaned at an early age and receiving no schooling, Fu Shanxiang read documents aloud to him. She issued pardons in Yang's name for many who had broken the laws against opium and alcohol.

However, at one point she spoke disrespectfully to Yang, and may have been smoking tobacco or using alcohol, each of which was in itself a capital offense under the puritanical Taiping codes. At Yang's request, the Heavenly King, Hong Xiuquan, issued "An Edict Condemning A Chancelloress," which noted that while drunk, Fu had insulted the East King and shown extreme disrespect. Alcohol was forbidden in the Taiping Kingdom, therefore her punishment should have been immediate decapitation. But Hong took into account her record of good service and that she was under the influence of alcohol when she lost control of her words (the nature of the words is not indicated). Hong decreed that the "lightest punishment will be given," namely that Fu should wear the cangue on seven Sabbath days, after which she could regain office and redeem herself.

Fu then wrote a letter of penitence in what she called "extreme fear of her unpardonable crime." She thanked Yang, the Eastern King, for his role in getting her such light punishment:

In drunken carelessness, by a slip of the tongue I offended the Eastern King. Were the Eastern King to confer death upon this maidservant, how could she begrudge him her death? But now, by an excessive expression of mercy, execution has not been imposed; instead I only have been made to wear the cangue as a display of light punishment.... Yet the life of an ant is not safe night or day. On my part, as a woman, I have had extraordinary fortune in having been given administrative authority over women and having risen to heights in the feminine world. Already gloriously fortunate to the extreme, what regrets would I have in death? ... With regret I look back to your kind regard without which I can no longer sustain myself in this world.... The pair of gold bracelets which Your Majesty kindly gave me, I, at the brink of death, return by messenger to you, wrapped in some red gauze which I myself have worn.... If your Highness should one day think of my humble service, when you see this it will be like seeing me, your maidservant. ("Letter from A Chancelloress to the Tung Wang (Dong Wang)," (n.d.))

Fu resumed her service, taking special responsibilities for women's hostels.

In March 1854, Yang, delivering his edicts as the word of God, declared that the heroes of the Chinese past were to be respected and certain core values maintained. His orders responded to the unease of many people in newly occupied areas who did not agree with Hong Xiuquan's radical program of attacking tradition. A rift opened between Yang and Hong. Because he respected her knowledge of the classics, Yang ordered Fu to write an edict explaining why the heroes of former times should in fact be honored. She earned Yang's praise when she wrote

Heroes are those who, by the grace of the Heavenly Father [that is, Shangdi], have been inspired by the spirit and therefore are born intelligent and become discreet and decent when they grow older. They honor filial piety at home and practise loyalty and patriotism when they are in society.... when they die, their heroic exploits will be transmitted in history. They enjoy eternal glory in having their meritorious achievement and deeds recorded in books which, as ordained by the Heavenly Father, should never be destroyed.

Yang Xiuqing was assassinated in September, 1856, presumably on Hong's orders, and thousands of his followers killed. Fu was not killed in this slaughter, but committed suicide in 1864 by poison when the emperor's forces began recapturing Nanjing.

== In popular culture ==
Fu Shanxiang caught the attention of later playwrights and novelists. She is presented in the 1943 play Tianguo chunqiu by Yang Hansheng as having a romance with Yang Xiuqing leading to a tragic conclusion because of jealousy with Hong Xuanjiao, sister of Hong Xiuquan. This incident also appears in the 2000 CCTV series, The Taiping Heavenly Kingdom, and her fate is depicted in a section of Xu Xaobin's 1998 novel, Yu she, translated as Feathered Serpent.

== References and further reading ==
- Mao, Jiaqi (Grace Chor Yi Wong tr.) (1998), "Fu Shanxiang", in Ho Clara Wing-chug (ed.), Biographical Dictionary of Chinese Women, Armonk, NY: Sharpe, pp. 43–45, ISBN 0765600439
- Chin, Shunshin, translated by Joshua A. Fogel (2001). The Taiping Rebellion. Armonk, N.Y.: M.E. Sharpe. ISBN 0765601001.
- Eberstein, Bernd (1990). A Selective Guide to Chinese Literature, 1900–1949 Vol 4. Leiden; New York: E.J. Brill. ISBN 9004090983.
- Michael, Franz H. (1971). The Taiping Rebellion; History and Documents Volume II. Seattle: University of Washington Press. ISBN 0295739592.
- Spence, Jonathan D. (1996). God's Chinese Son: The Taiping Heavenly Kingdom of Hong Xiuquan. New York: W.W. Norton. ISBN 0393038440.
- Yang, Hansheng 陽翰笙 (1946). 天國春秋: [五幕歷史劇] Tian Guo Chun Qiu : [Wu Mu Li Shi Ju]. Shanghai: Qunyi chubanshe.
