= Nguyễn Thị Duệ =

Vietnamese consort and female scholar

- Born: 1574; Kiệt Đặc village, Bằng Châu, Dương Kinh, Việt Nam
- Died: 1654 (aged 79–80); Đông Kinh, Việt Nam
- Spouse(s): Mạc Đại Tông; Lê Thần Tông

Nguyễn Thị Duệ (阮氏叡, 1574 – 1654) courtesy name Ngọc Toàn (玉全), pen name Diệu Huyền (妙玄), Đào Hoa Am (桃花庵), was a Vietnamese Imperial consort and scholar, referred to as the first female doctorate of Việt Nam.

== Biography ==
Nguyễn Thị Duệ, also recorded in some documents as Nguyễn Thị Du (阮氏游), or Diệu Huyền, or Nguyễn Thị Ngọc Toàn (阮氏玉瓚), was born on March 14, 1574, in the village of Kiệt Đặc (now Văn An Ward, Chí Linh City, Hải Dương Province).

She was regarded as a woman of exceptional beauty and intelligence. By the age of ten, she was already composing essays and poems, drawing the attention of many aristocratic families who came to ask for her hand in marriage. However, her family did not agree to any proposals. In 1592, the capital Thang Long was captured by the Trịnh army. The Mạc dynasty had lost all of Việt Nam except for the areas around Cao Bằng Province. The remnants of the Mạc fled to Cao Bằng, and Nguyễn Thị Duệ followed her family there.

Being an avid learner, but living in a time when women were not allowed to study or take exams, Nguyễn Thị Duệ disguised herself as a man to pursue education. In the Imperial Civil Service Exams of the year 1594, she registered under the alias Nguyễn Du and topped the exam at the age of 20, achieving the rank and title of doctorate, according to many sources, the first women in Vietnam to do so. At the banquet held to honor the new laureates, Emperor Mạc Kính Cung noticed the slim build and elegant features of the top scholar and grew suspicious. Upon questioning and investigation, it was revealed that the scholar was in fact a woman in disguise.

Cross-dressing to take the imperial exam was considered a crime of deceiving the sovereign, but the emperor, rather than punishing her, was amused and praised her talent. Later, the Mạc emperor summoned her to the palace to teach the Imperial Consorts, and she was eventually selected to become a royal concubine herself, some months later, titled Tinh Phi (The Star Consort) – a name that praised her for being both beautiful and brilliant like a shining star. People affectionately called her “Bà Chúa Sao” (Lady Star)

While serving in the royal court, she was deeply concerned with examinations and the nurturing of talents. In most imperial and national exams, she was involved in reviewing and grading the candidates’ works. Several times a month, she would join esteemed scholars to teach and review lessons for young students. She also petitioned the royal court to allocate fertile lands to be cultivated for profits to support hardworking, talented poor students.

In 1625, the Lê and Trịnh armies advanced to Cao Bằng and defeated the Mạc dynasty. Nguyễn Thị Duệ retreated into the forest to go into hiding but was captured by soldiers. Instead of executing her, admiring her intellect, the Trịnhs allowed her to oversee education in the royal court.

During a celebration, Nguyễn Thị Duệ befriended Empress Trịnh Thị Ngọc Trúc (wife of Emperor Lê Thần Tông). From then on, the two would often go to temples together, meeting wise monks and virtuous religious leaders, and also engaging with talented scholars like Giang Văn Minh, Khương Thế Hiền, and others to gain insights into national affairs. She would then advise the emperor and lords to adjust policies accordingly. Due to her many contributions, she was promoted to the title and rank of Chiêu Nghi the third highest concubine rank of nine in the court, just below the Empress and the Noble Consort. She was also given the honorific Nghi Ái Quan the (Esteemed Court Lady of Grace and Affection) given for recognition of her virtue, intellect, service and the respect she commends.

At the age of 70, Nguyễn Thị Duệ requested to retire and return to her hometown, when she was retired she had a small hermitage called Đào Hoa Am (Peach Blossom Retreat), where she read books and mentored local and curious students. The Lê emperor granted her the annual tax revenue of the entire Kiệt Đặc region as a pension. However, she only used a small portion for personal needs, dedicating the rest to public welfare and helping the poor.

She died on November 8, 1654, at the age of 81. After her death, the local people built a temple in her honor and worshipped her as a deity of benevolence.
