= Tang Gao =

Ming Chinese scholar

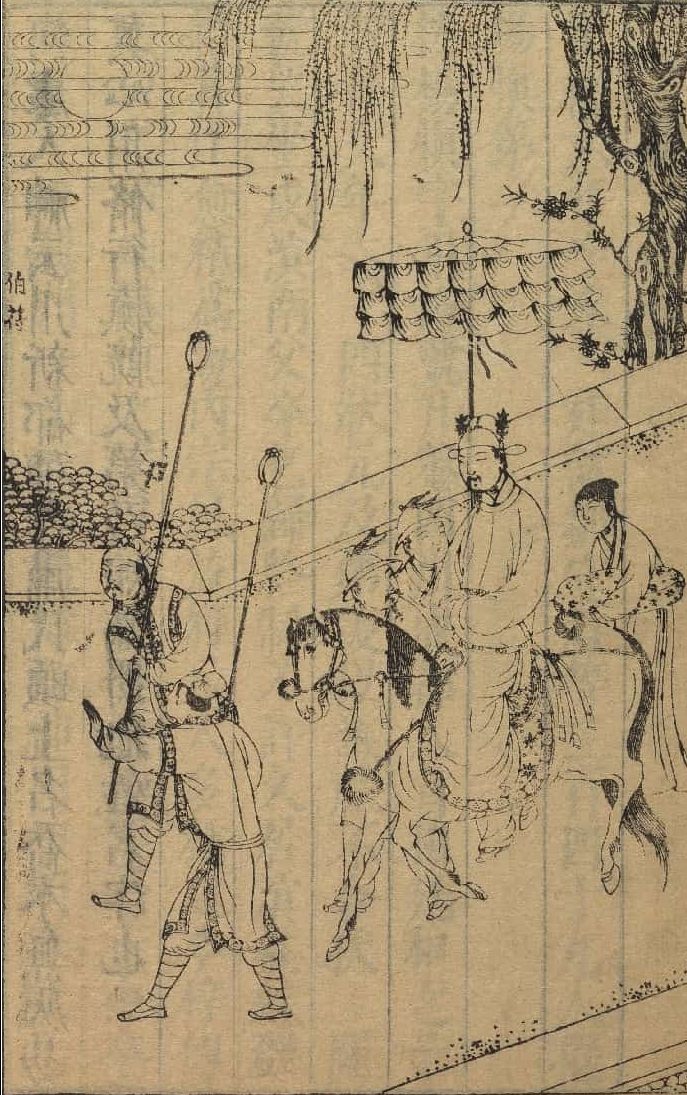
- Tang Gao having passed the imperial exams as Zhuangyuan
- Born: 1469; Yansi, She, Huizhou, South Zhili, China
- Died: 1526 (aged 56–57)

Tang Gao (唐皋, 1469–1526) was born in Yansi town (巖寺鎮), She county (歙縣), Huizhou (徽州府), South Zhili (南直隸), in Ming China. Tang Gao became the Zhuangyuan, or Number One Scholar (狀元) in the ninth year (1514) of the Zhengde Emperor's (正德皇帝) reign during the Ming dynasty. He styled himself as Shouzhi (守之), Xin’an (心庵), and Ziyang hermit (紫陽山人). Due to his premature death, the loss of his biography and epitaph, and the fact that much of his early life was not documented, scholars have been unable put together a detailed summary of his life.

== Life ==
Tang Gao was born into an educated and aristocratic family within a well-established Cheng-Zhu Neo-Confucianist (程朱理學) academic tradition. Little is known about his early life, but at some point his family lost much of their wealth and he led a meager lifestyle during early adulthood. Despite failing the imperial examinations (科舉) multiple times he eventually passed and started his career as an Imperial Historian at the Hanlin Academy (翰林院修撰兼修國史). He then became an expositor of the academy (翰林院侍講學士兼經筵講官) but died unexpectedly in 1526 aged 58. His 12-year political career, though relatively short, was during the transition from the Zhengde Emperor (正德皇帝) to the Jiajing Emperor's (嘉靖皇帝) reign during the Ming dynasty, and was a period of great change to politics, the economy, academic life, and literature.

== Political activities ==
Tang Gao, who had a straightforward attitude and was mature in nature, was generally considered to be a future Prime Minister (宰輔). At the beginning of his official life, he had already adopted the view that the government statutes (紀綱) should be strengthened. In the twelfth year of Zhengde Emperor (1517), as the vice examiner of the metropolitan examination (會試同考官), he appointed many talented people. When the Zhengde Emperor died, he served as an imperial envoy abroad to Korea (欽差朝鮮正使) and issued the Imperial Edict of the Ascent to the Throne of the Jiajing Emperor (登極改元詔), which was the peak of his political career. During his visit to Joseon (李氏朝鮮), he was acclaimed as the most righteous man in the world by the King and officials there, due to his discipline and honesty. After he returned to China, Tang Gao wanted to realize his aspirations, and wrote a letter depicting the employment problems of the Jiajing Emperor. In the “Great Rites Controversy”(“大禮議事件”), he mediated between the two groups, and expressed political foresight, which angered the Emperor. In the fourth year of Jiajing Emperor, “The Factual Record of Ming Emperor Wu Zong”(《明武宗實錄》) was finished. As a historian, he made a significant contribution to the historiography of the Ming dynasty.

== Confucianism ==
Tang Gao once pursued his studies in Ziyang Academy (紫陽書院), the Prefectural School (府學) of Huizhou, where the Cheng-Zhu Neo-Confucianism was deeply rooted. He advocated pragmatism, focused on the ways of the world and the heart of humans, so that his early works all agreed with the concept of Neo-Confucianism. However, in his late years, he turned to WangYangming’s Idealistic Theories (陽明心學), and his articles then combined both the Cheng-zhu School and the Idealistic School. Unlike his early poems and essays, which regarded Taoism (道教)as heresy, his late works often cited Buddhist Scriptures (佛典). The representative work of the convergence of the three religions (三教合一) entitled “Xingming guizhi” was circulated.

== Literature ==
As Tang Gao advocated pragmatism, his works focused on the documentary form. Influenced by the “Former Seven Scholars”(“前七子”), his writing style tended to revert to the old ways. The several existing Yue Fu (樂府詩) drafted by him all seemed extraordinary with a trace of Yang Weizhen’s (楊維楨) style. The poems were once selected into Qian Qianyi (錢謙益)’s “Lie-Chao-Shi-Ji”(《列朝詩集》), which represented his retroactive trend. He especially admired Li Mengyang (李夢陽) and was also on good terms with some retroactive scholars like Wang Jiusi (王九思). During his diplomatic mission, he versified together with some civil officials of the Joseon dynasty such as Li Xing (李荇), and introduced the opinions of the"Former Seven Scholars" such as Li Mengyang from the official level. The “Xin-Si-Huang-Hua-Ji”(《辛巳皇華集》) versification and the direct result—the spread of Li Mengyang's poetry eastwards, had a far-reaching effect on the literary innovation in the mid and late period of the Joseon dynasty.

In addition, several of his travel poems carried a style of Xie Lingyun (謝靈運)’s scenic poems. Among them, some particular ones also contained the style of Tang Yin (唐寅)’s Wu School. His poetic creation drew widely from others’ strong points and appealed to both refined and popular taste. This was quite similar to that of his good friend Yang Shen (楊慎).

== Wife and Sons ==
Tang Gao led a short life, which made many scholars feel that he had not fulfilled himself. Tang Gao's wife Yan (閻氏) left a single poem, with the prosperous charm of the Tang dynasty. His eldest grandson Tang Rulong (唐汝龍) received a good education from Tang Gao, studied Li Bai (李白)’s poetic style and was highly appreciated by Qian Qianyi. He attempted the imperial examinations several times but was unsuccessful and grew depressed.
