= Confucian court examination system in Vietnam =

Vietnamese civil service examination system (1075–1919)

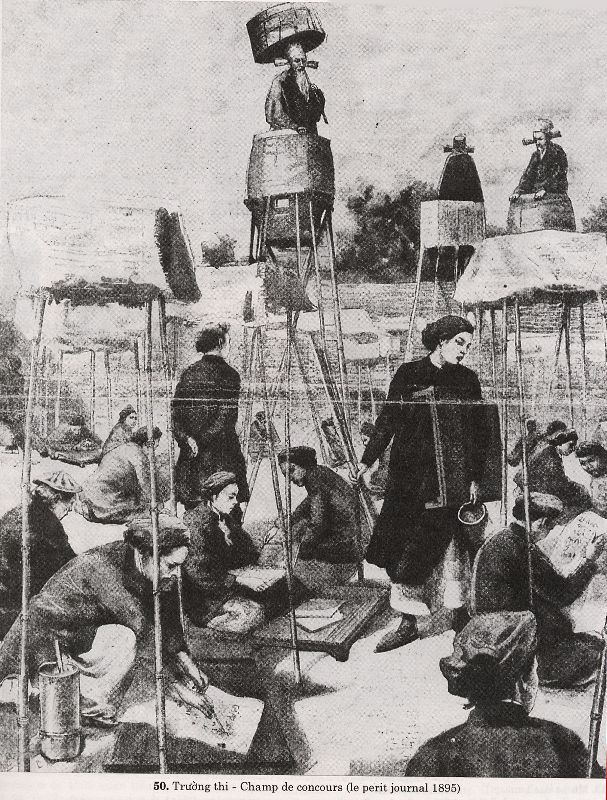
- The civil service examination (1895) being administered. Exam invigilators are seen overseeing the testing.
- Vietnamese alphabet: khoa cử
- Chữ Hán: 科舉

The Confucian court examination system in Vietnam (Vietnamese: Khoa cử, [xʷa˧ kɯ˧˩˧]; chữ Hán: 科舉越南) was a civil service examination system for selecting civil officials. Established in 1075 under the Lý dynasty and lasting until 1919 under the Nguyễn dynasty, this system was heavily influenced by the Chinese imperial examination model. The examinations evaluated candidates' understanding of ethical and political principles in the Confucian classics. Candidates were required to demonstrate literary competence through established classical forms, including kinh nghĩa (經義; exegesis of the classics), thơ - phú (詩-賦; regulated verse and rhapsodic prose), chế - chiếu - biểu (制-詔-表; edicts and memorials) and văn sách (文策; policy essays and discourses).

== History ==
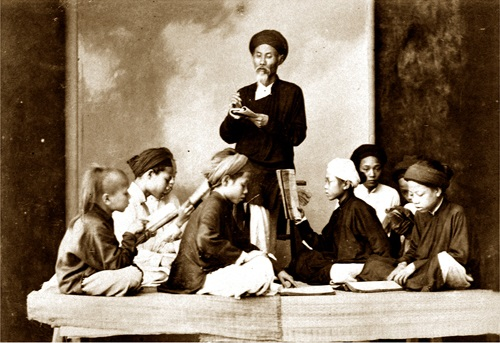
A private class at a home in Vietnam (1895). The students studying are sitting on a sập.

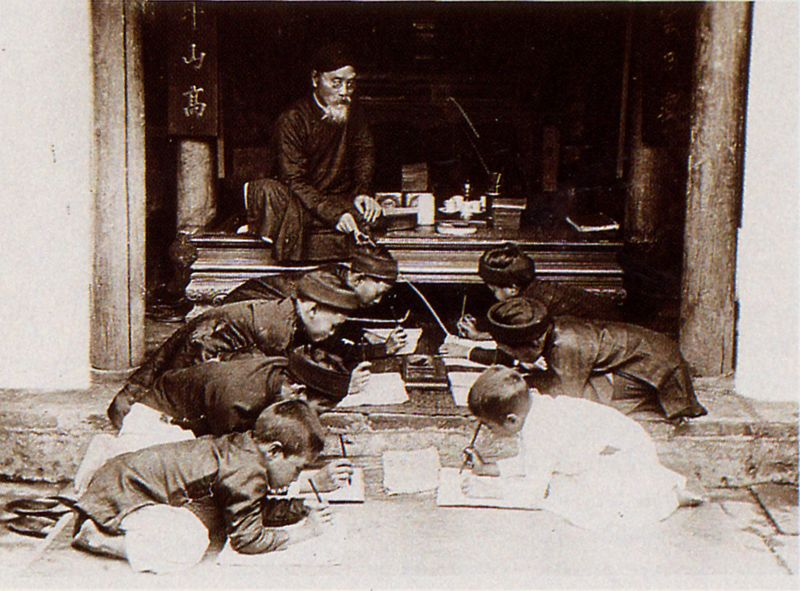
A private class at a home in Vietnam.

The civil service examination system was introduced to Vietnam during the extended period of Chinese domination. Local individuals from the Annam, such as Jiang Gongfu (姜公輔; Khương Công Phụ), successfully passed the imperial examinations. Jiang Gongfu subsequently served as a chancellor during the reign of Emperor Dezong of the Tang dynasty.

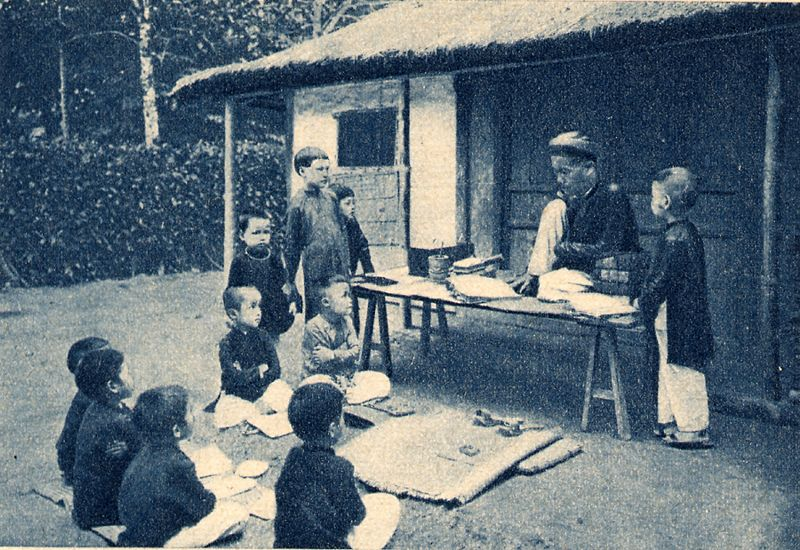
A class during the Nguyễn dynasty. The children are being taught chữ Hán (Chinese characters).

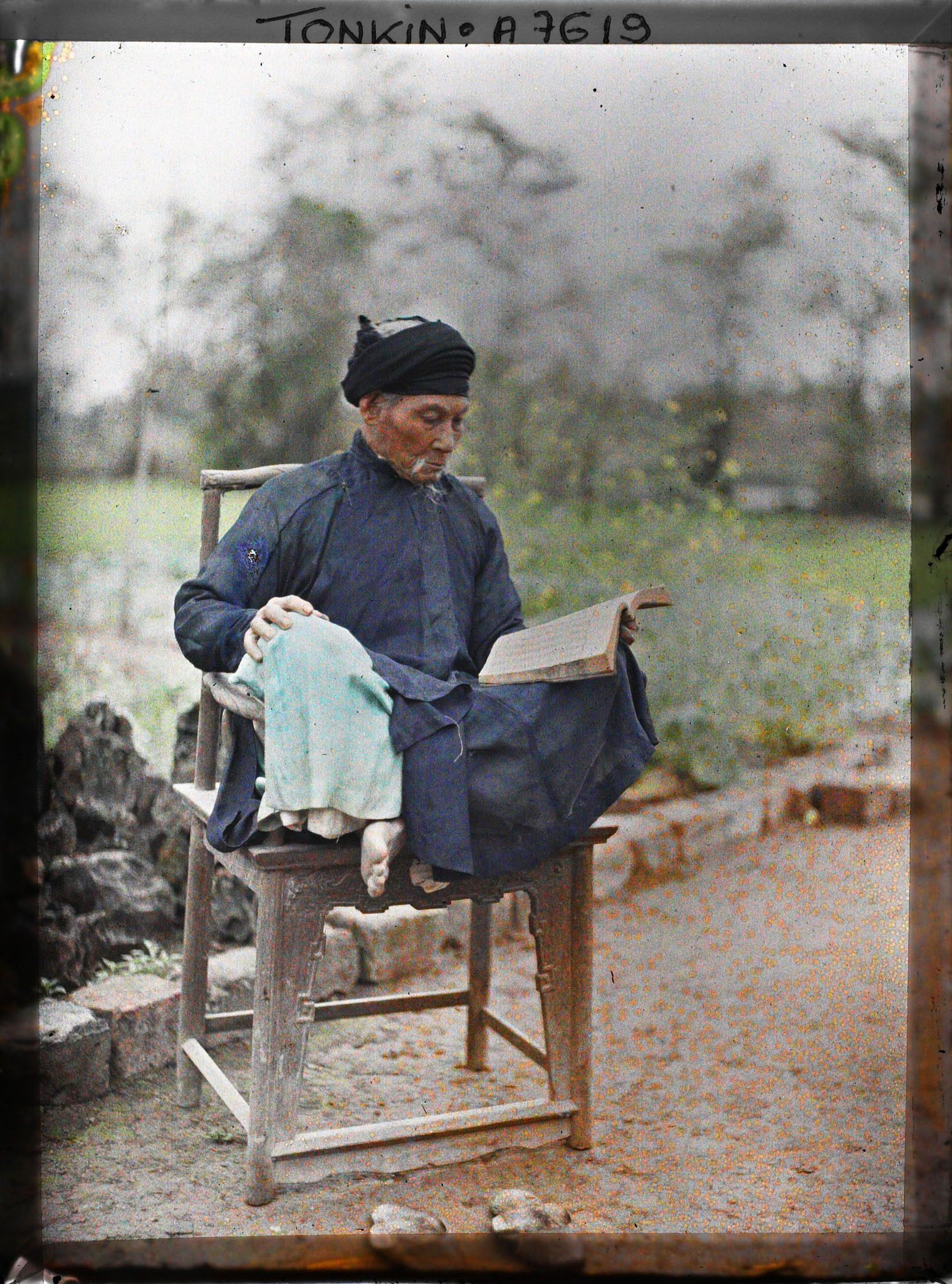
An old Confucian scholar reading book in Hanoi, 1915.

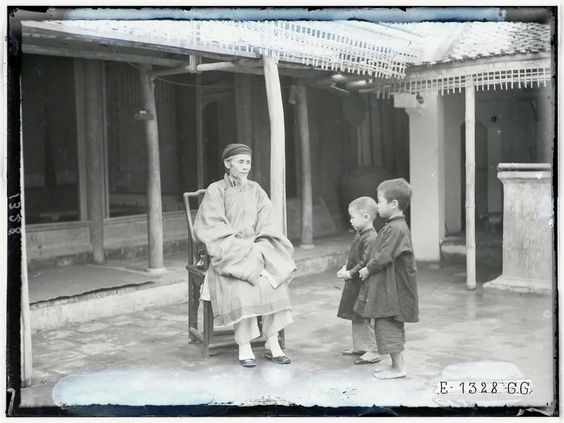
Tutor and young students.

=== Lý dynasty ===
The civil service examinations were first instituted at court level by Emperor Lý Nhân Tông in 1075. The civil examination had three-rounds (tam trường; 三場). These rounds tested knowledge of the Confucian classics, poetry, and the ability to compose official documents and essays. There were no set intervals for civil examinations. In total, there were seven examinations during the Lý dynasty:

- 1075 (乙卯; Ất Mão), the top candidate was Lê Văn Thịnh (黎文盛), a native of Đông Cứu, Gia Định prefecture.
- 1086 (丙寅; Bính Dần), the top candidate was Mạc Hiển Tích (莫顯績), a native of Lũng Động, Chí Linh district.
- 1152 (壬申; Nhâm Thân), the examination was held in the court.
- 1165 (乙酉; Ất Dậu), candidates were tested for the rank of Thái học sinh (太學生)
- 1185 (乙巳; Ất Tị), the three top candidates were Bùi Quốc Khái (裴國愾), Đỗ Thế Diên (杜世延), and Đặng Nghiêm (鄧嚴). Candidates ages 15 and older were allowed to participate.
- 1193 (癸丑; Quý Sửu)
- 1195 (乙卯; Ất Mão), candidates were tested on the three teachings (三教; tam giáo). The historian Ngô Sĩ Liên (吳士連) criticised the exam where he stated that Confucians of the past studied the Hundred Schools of Thought extensively and also studied Taoism and Buddhism. However, later realised that Taoism and Buddhism were vague and elusive, lacking any firm grasp. Thus, they returned to studying the Six Classics. Anyone who studied Confucianism and then also studied Taoism and Buddhism would find Taoist texts saying things like: "Heaven transforms in myriad ways; whether there is virtue or not depends on the circumstances; responses arise accordingly; the traces are never constant." Buddhist texts say: "No birth, no death, no coming, no going, no strength, no form." All of this is disordered... and would still be of no benefit.

In the first volume of the book, Đỉnh khiết Đại Việt lịch triều đăng khoa lục (鼎鍥大越歷朝登科錄). There is a passage in the appendix that states:

李朝惠宗皇帝
戊辰貞慶三年試大學生

Lý triều Huệ Tông hoàng đế
Mậu Thìn Trinh Khánh tam niên thí Đại học sinh

The Lý dynasty emperor Lý Huệ Tông, in the year of Mậu Thìn (戊辰) during the third year of Trinh Khánh (貞慶) era, candidates were tested for the rank of Đại học sinh (大學生). (Note: Đại học sinh (大學生) may be a scribal error for Thái học sinh (太學生).)

The exact date of this examination is uncertain because (1) the era name during the reign of Lý Huệ Tông was Kiến Gia (建嘉), not Trinh Khánh (貞慶) and (2) the year Mậu Thìn (戊辰) does not correspond to any year within his reign.

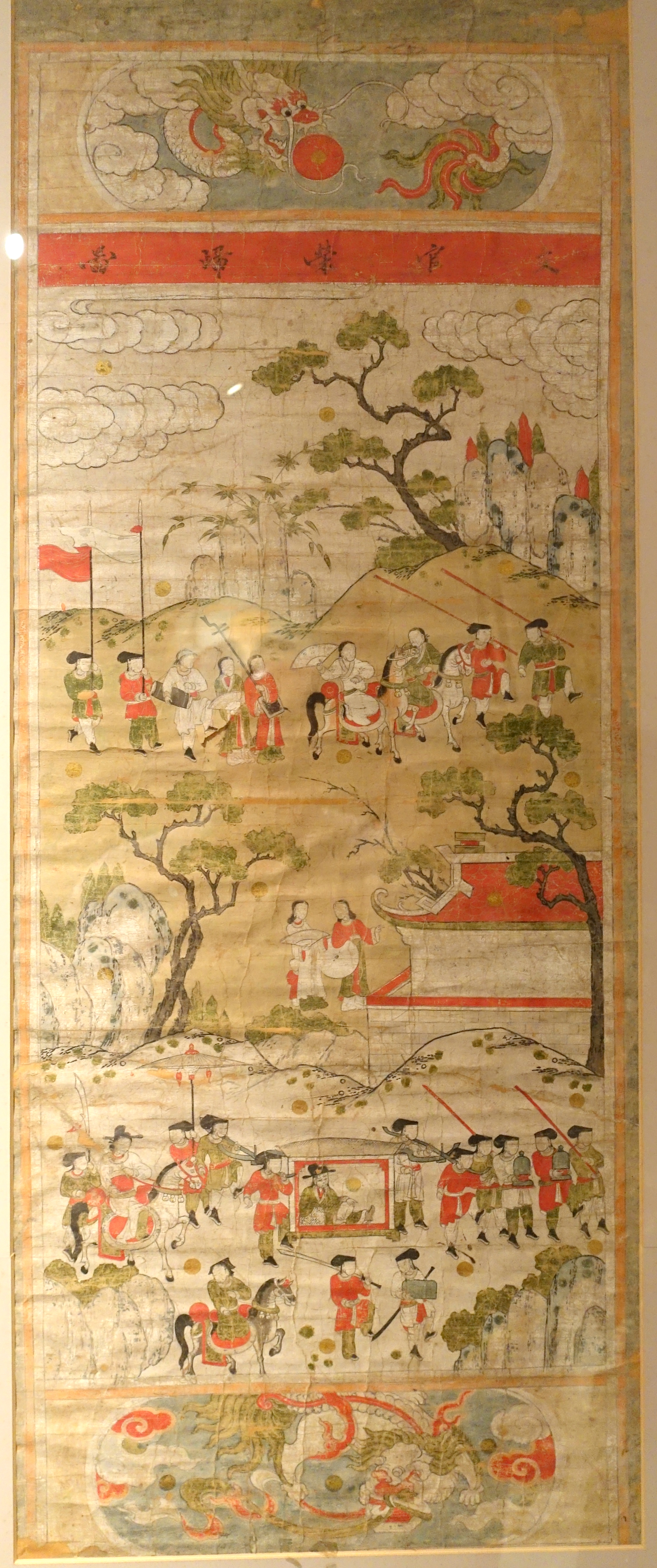
A civil mandarin returning in glory (榮歸; vinh quy) after the examination in the painting, 文官榮歸圖 (Văn quan vinh quy đồ), late 18th century

=== Trần dynasty ===
In 1227, the civil service examinations were re-instituted where candidates were tested on the three teachings (三教; tam giáo).

In 1232, during the reign of Trần Thái Tông, the civil service examinations were expanded upon, initially the court instituted the Thái học sinh examination. The examinations were to be held every seven years. Later, the 1247 examination introduced the rankings of tam giáp (三甲), dividing candidates into three tiers for the court examination.

Dynasty	Nhất giáp	Nhị giáp	Tam giáp
Trần dynasty	Tam khôi (三魁): Trạng nguyên (狀元); Bảng nhãn (榜眼); Thám hoa (探花)	Hoàng giáp (黄甲)	Thái học sinh (太學生)
Lê dynasty	Tam khôi (三魁)/Tiến sĩ cập đệ (進士及第): Trạng nguyên (狀元); Bảng nhãn (榜眼); Thám hoa (探花)	Hoàng giáp (黄甲) Tiến sĩ xuất thân (進士出身)	Đồng tiến sĩ xuất thân (同進士出身)
Nguyễn dynasty	Tam khôi (三魁)/Tiến sĩ cập đệ (進士及第): Trạng nguyên (狀元); Bảng nhãn (榜眼); Thám hoa (探花)	Hoàng giáp (黄甲) Tiến sĩ xuất thân (進士出身)	Đồng tiến sĩ xuất thân (同進士出身)

Beginning in 1256, the rank of trạng nguyên (狀元) was split into Kinh trạng nguyên (京狀元; metropolitan zhuangyuan) and Trại trạng nguyên (寨狀元; rural zhuangyuan) as the provinces from that year, Thanh Hóa and Nghệ An were designated as rural territories (trại). This distinction continued until 1275.

In 1305, during the reign of Emperor Trần Anh Tông, the structure of the examinations was changed from three-rounds (tam trường; 三場) to four-rounds (tứ trường; 四場) which consisted of:

1. Kinh nghĩa (經義; exegesis of the classics)
2. Thơ - phú (詩-賦; regulated verse and rhapsodic prose)
3. Chế - chiếu - biểu (制-詔-表; edicts and memorials)
4. Đối sách (對策; policy response essays and discourses)

Prior to the examination, there was an entrance exam to eliminate unqualified candidates. It consisted of candidates copying from memory (ám tả; 暗寫) excerpts of two books, Y quốc thiên (醫國篇) and Mục thiên tử truyện (穆天子傳). The first round of the exam required candidates to analyze Confucian classics and explain them. The second round required candidates to write a poem in long-form five-character poems (ngũ ngôn trường thiên; 五言長篇). The round also required candidates to write a phú (賦) in eight-rhyme verse using these four characters (tài 才, nan 難, xạ 射, and trĩ 雉) to rhyme. The third round tested candidates on writing edicts, decrees, and memorials. The final round focused on the policy response essay (đối sách; 對策), where candidates addressed hypothetical or real policy issues asked by the emperor, writing proposals for governance.

In 1345, examinations were held for students of imperial academy, the book Đại Việt sử ký tiệp lục tổng tự (大越史記捷錄總序) records:

試𭓇生於茹大𭓇，用法經義詩賦。

Thi học sinh ở nhà Đại học, dùng phép kinh nghĩa thi phú.

Tested the students at the imperial academy, using the methods such as exegesis of the classics, regulated verse poems, and rhapsodic prose.

— folio 21a

It was not until the 1374 examination that changed rank of Thái học sinh (太學生) into tiến sĩ (進士).

In 1396, emperor Trần Thuận Tông issued an edict establishing the format for the provincial examination and the metropolitan examination, both to be conducted in four stages of classical-style composition. It also abolished the ám tả (暗寫) part of the examination.

- One essay on exegesis of the classics, including sections such as breaking the topic (phá đề), transitional phrases (tiếp ngữ), minor discussion (tiểu giảng), original theme (nguyên đề), major discussion (đại giảng), and conclusion (kết luận), with a minimum of 500 characters.
- One regulated poem in Tang style (Đường luật; 唐律), and one phú in either the ancient style (cổ thể; 古體), the Li Sao style (ly tao; 離騷), or the Wenxuan style (văn tuyển; 文選), each also requiring at least 500 characters.
- One imperial edict (chiếu; 詔), one imperial decree (chế; 制), and one memorial (biểu; 表) written in Tang-style four-six prose (tứ lục; 唐體四六).
- One policy essay (văn sách; 文策), with topics drawn from the Confucian Classics, history, or current affairs, each essay required to be at least 1,000 characters.

The provincial examination is held one year, with the metropolitan examination following in the subsequent year.

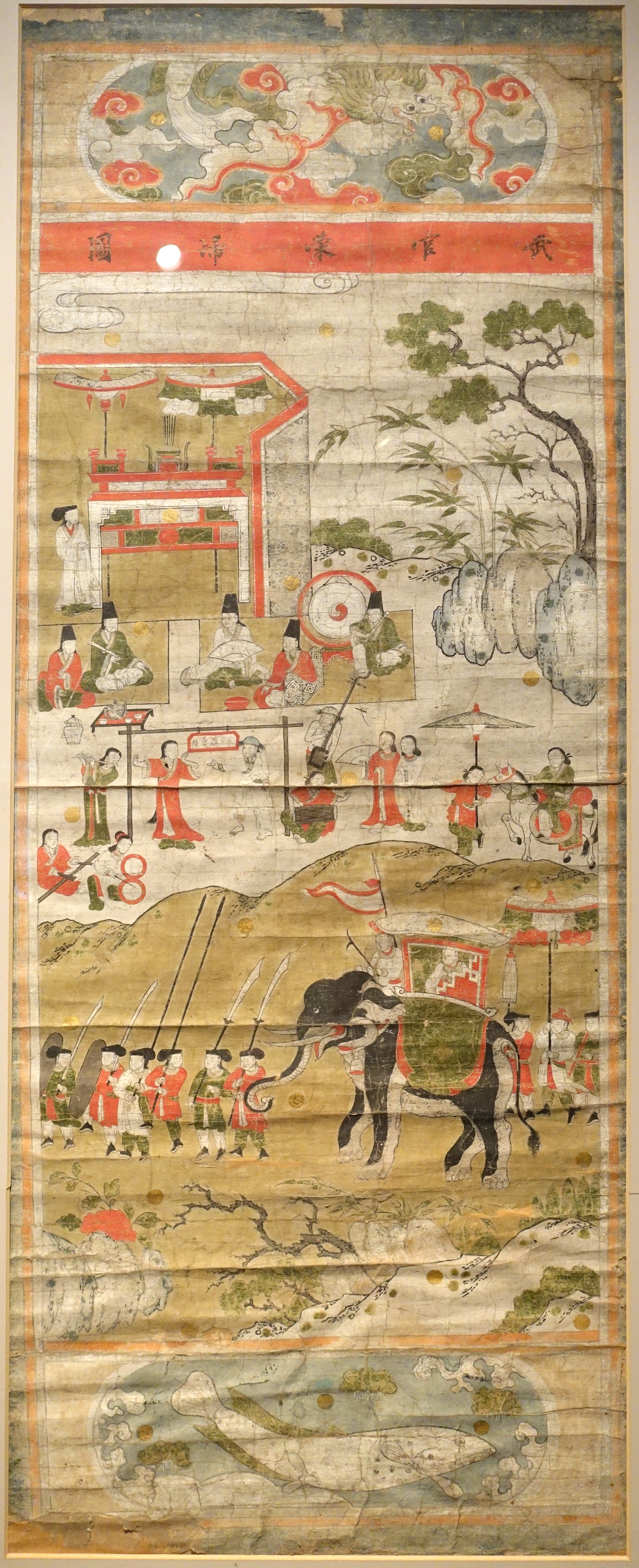
A military mandarin returning in glory (榮歸; vinh quy) after the examination in the painting, 武官榮歸圖 (Vũ quan vinh quy đồ)

=== Hồ dynasty ===
Shortly after Hồ Quý Ly usurped the Trần throne in 1400, in the eighth month of that year, an examination was held to test candidates for the rank of Thái học sinh (太學生) where thirty people passed the examination. The top candidate of the examination was Lưu Thúc Kiệm (劉叔儉), native of Trạm Lộ, Gia Bình district. Candidates in the Nhị giáp (二甲) tier included Nguyễn Trãi (阮廌), Lý Tử Tấn (李子晋), Vũ Mộng Nguyên (武夣原), Hoàng Hiến (黄憲), and Nguyễn Thành (阮誠).

A provincial examination was held in eighth month of 1405 at the Ministry of Rites where 170 candidates passed. Anyone who passed would be exempt from corvée labor. In the eighth month of the following year, the Ministry of Rites (Lễ bộ) would hold an examination, and those who passed would be exempt from official appointment. In the eighth month of the year after that, the metropolitan examination would be held, and those who passed would be appointed as Thái học sinh. In the subsequent year, the provincial examination would be held again, repeating the cycle.

The examination method followed the Yuan dynasty system, consisting of three main rounds. The writing component was divided into four rounds, with an additional round for writing and calculation, making five rounds in total.

=== Fourth Era of Northern Domination ===
A section in the book, Lịch triều hiến chương loại chí (歷朝憲章類誌), states:

按我國屬明時。三司雖行科舉。而士皆隱道不應。場法久廢。

Án ngã quốc thuộc Minh thời. Tam ti tuy hành khoa cử, nhi sĩ giai ẩn đạo bất ứng. Trường pháp cửu phế.

During the period when our country was under Ming rule, although the Three Bureaus still conducted the imperial examinations, the scholars all withdrew into seclusion and did not respond. The examination system had long been discontinued.

During this period, Neo-Confucianism (理學; lý học) gained more influence in Vietnam which influenced later examinations.

=== Mạc dynasty ===
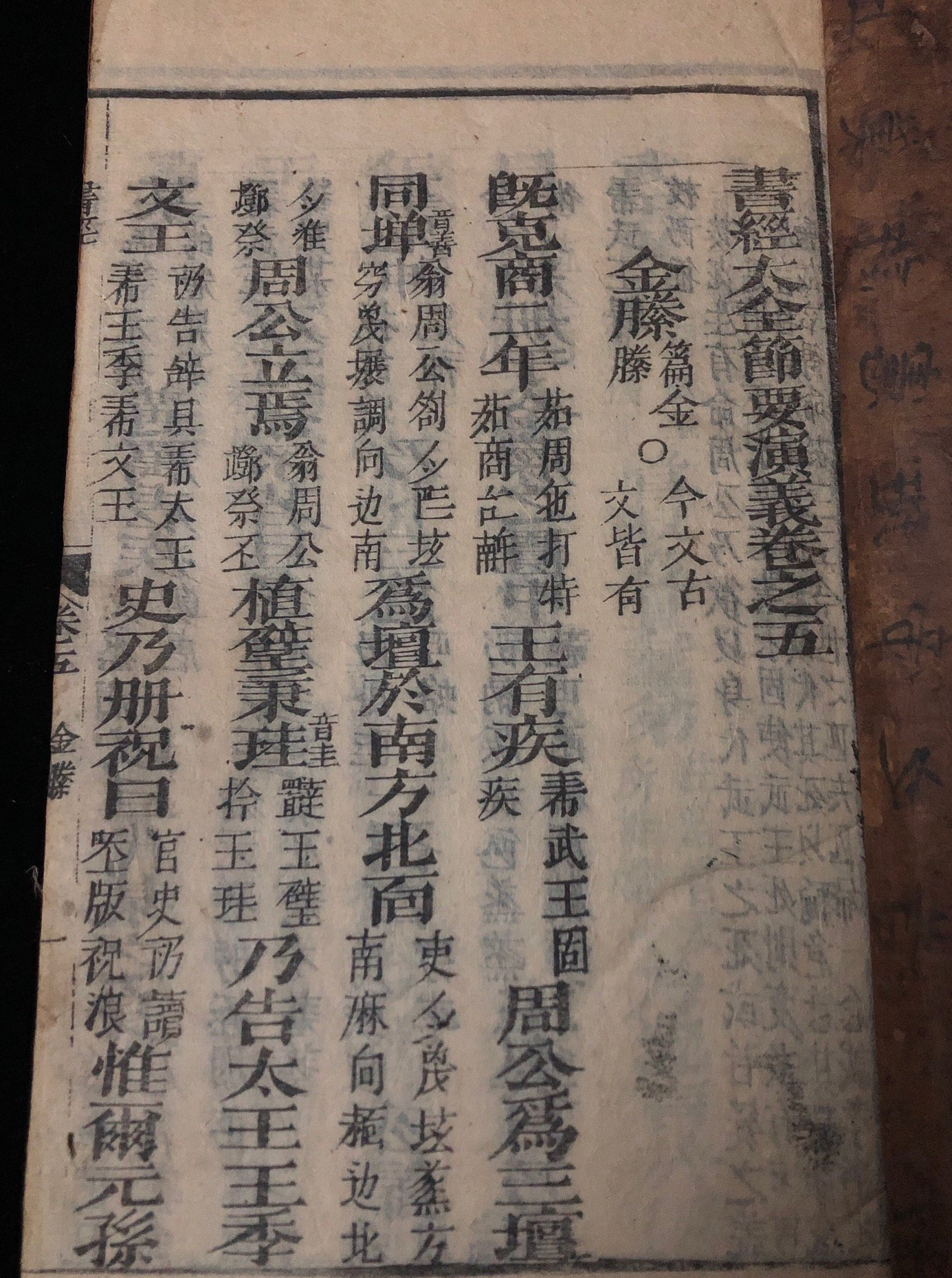
A giải âm translation of the Book of Documents (書經), one of the Five Classics. These translations were used to better understand the classics and allow people to pass the civil examinations.

=== Tây Sơn dynasty ===
In 1789, Sùng Chính viện (崇正院) was established and Nguyễn Thiếp (阮浹; 1723–1804) was appointed as head of the academy. Nguyễn Thiếp was tasked with reforming the civil service examinations and translating Chinese classics such as Four Books and Five Classics into vernacular Vietnamese (Nôm) for wider dissemination. These translations were done in giải âm (解音). Unlike previous dynasties with the exception of the Hồ dynasty, vernacular Vietnamese (Nôm) was included in the examinations. This was done by having the examination questions be written in Vietnamese and in the third round of the examinations, candidates had to compose poems and prose in Nôm.

The first and only Nôm provincial examination was held in eighth month of 1789 (己酉; Kỷ Dậu) in the Thanh Hóa and Nghệ An region during emperor Quang Trung's reign. The top graduate was Phan Đăng Đệ (潘登第), a man from Trà Lũ village, Giao Thủy district, Xuân Trường prefecture, Nam Định province. After the emperor’s death, Emperor Cảnh Thịnh sought to continue his father’s policies; however, the examination system during his reign was disrupted by war. Since regular examinations could not be held, regulations for khảo khóa (考課) were established.

In the second month, candidates entered the first round, tested on five topics of kinh nghĩa (經義; classical exegesis) and one topic of truyện nghĩa (傳義; commentary exegesis). In the fifth month, they entered the second round, tested on one composition each in parallel writing (四六文), chiếu (詔), chế (制), and biểu (表). In the eighth month, they entered the third round, tested on one regulated Tang-style poem in seven-character lines (七言唐律) and one phú (賦) in the eight-rhyme style. In the eleventh month, they entered the fourth round, tested on five or six passages of sách vấn (策問). Finally, in the twelfth month, a re-examination (phúc hạch; 覆核) was conducted, and the results were officially posted.

Although these examinations were referred to as khảo khóa, they were practically a provincial examination. There were two examinations in total, one in 1800 and the other in 1801. These examinations did not use chữ Nôm.

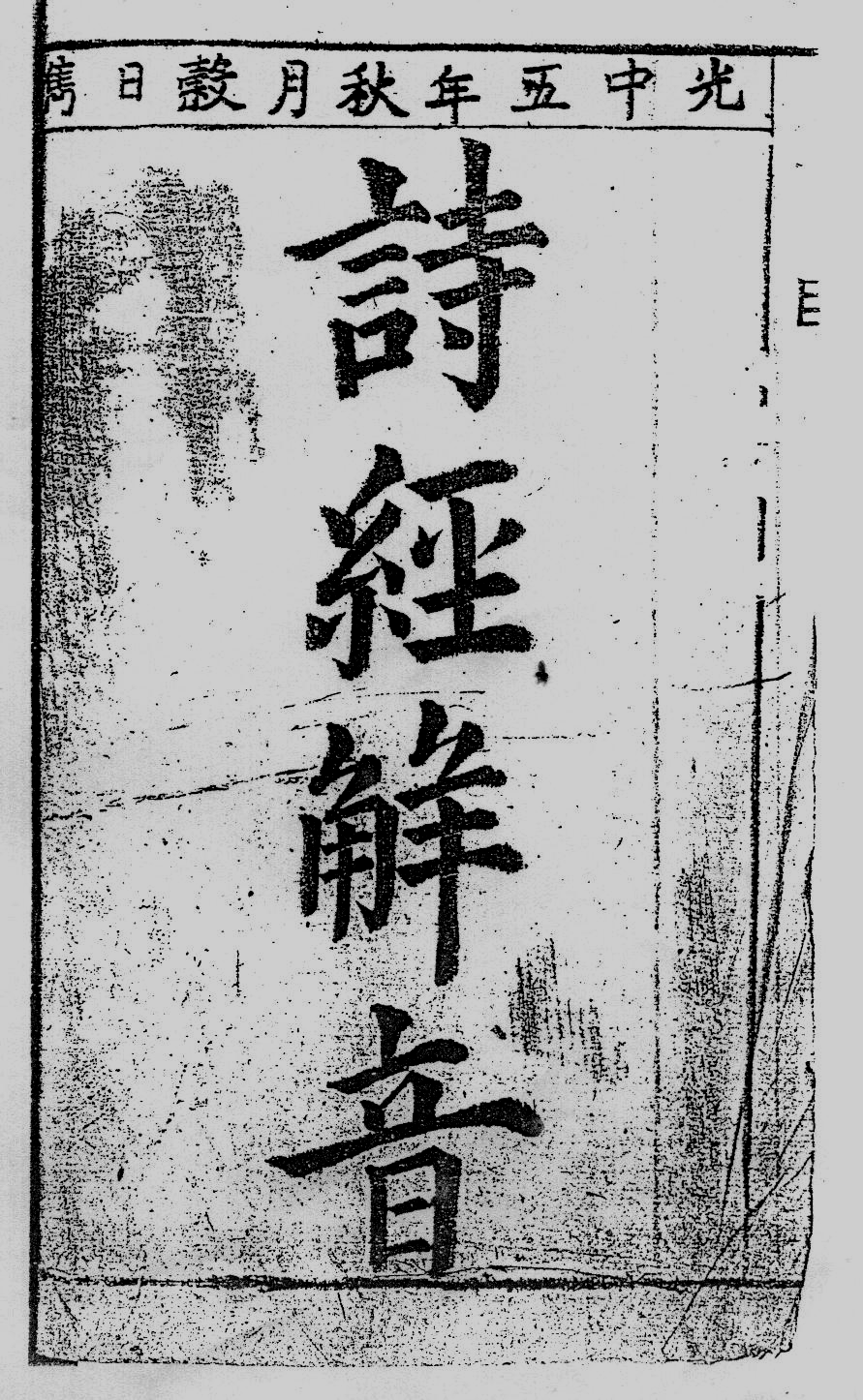
Chinese classics such as the Classic of Poetry (詩經) were translated to Vietnamese giải âm 解音 (1792; 光中五年) during the Tây Sơn dynasty.

=== Nguyễn dynasty ===
It wasn't until 1807 during Gia Long's reign that civil service examinations were re-instituted due to the instability of the state. Initially, only the thi Hương (試鄉; provincial examination) were held every six years. It was then in 1822, that thi Hội (試會; metropolitan examination), and thi Đình (試廷; court examination) were held again. In 1825, it was changed so that examinations were to be held every three years rather than six. It was standardised to be that the provincial examination would be held every Rat (子; Tí), Horse (午; Ngọ), Cat (卯; Mão), and Rooster (酉; Dậu) year. The exams in Thừa Thiên, Gia Định, and Nghệ An were held in seventh lunar month, while those in Thanh Hóa, Nam Định, and Bắc Thành (Hà Nội) were held in ninth lunar month. While the metropolitan examination would be held every Dragon (辰; Thìn), Dog (戌; Tuất), Buffalo (丑; Sửu), and Goat (未; Mùi) year, in third lunar month.

An excerpt from the book, Khâm định Đại Nam hội điển sự lệ (欽定大南會典事例), stated:

凡命題鄉、會試第一場傳用二題，《大學》、《中庸》傳一題，論孟一題，五經各一題。第二場用策問一道；古文各段須用大道理、大制度、確有根據…第三場詔表論各一道；第四場詩賦各一題，鄉試用七言唐律詩，會試用五言排律詩。

Phàm mệnh đề Hương, Hội thí đệ nhất trường truyền dụng nhị đề, Đại Học, Trung Dung truyền nhất đề, Luận Mạnh nhất đề. Ngũ kinh các nhất đề. Đệ nhị trường dụng sách vấn nhất đạo; cổ văn các đoạn tu dụng đại đạo lý, đại chế độ, xác hữu căn cứ... Đệ tam trường chiếu, biểu, luận, các nhất đạo; đệ tứ trường thi phú các nhất đề, Hương thí dụng thất ngôn Đường luật thi, Hội thí dụng ngũ ngôn bài luật thi.

In general, for the first round of both the provincial and metropolitan examinations, two essay questions based on classical texts are assigned: one from either the Great Learning or the Doctrine of the Mean, one from either the Analects or Mencius, and one question from each of the Five Classics. The second round consists of a single policy question; each section of classical prose must address great principles, grand institutions, and must have solid basis... The third round includes one imperial edict, one memorial to the throne, and one formal essay; The fourth round requires one poem and one fu, the provincial examination uses a seven-character regulated Tang-style poem, while the metropolitan exam uses five-character regulated verses arranged in sequence.

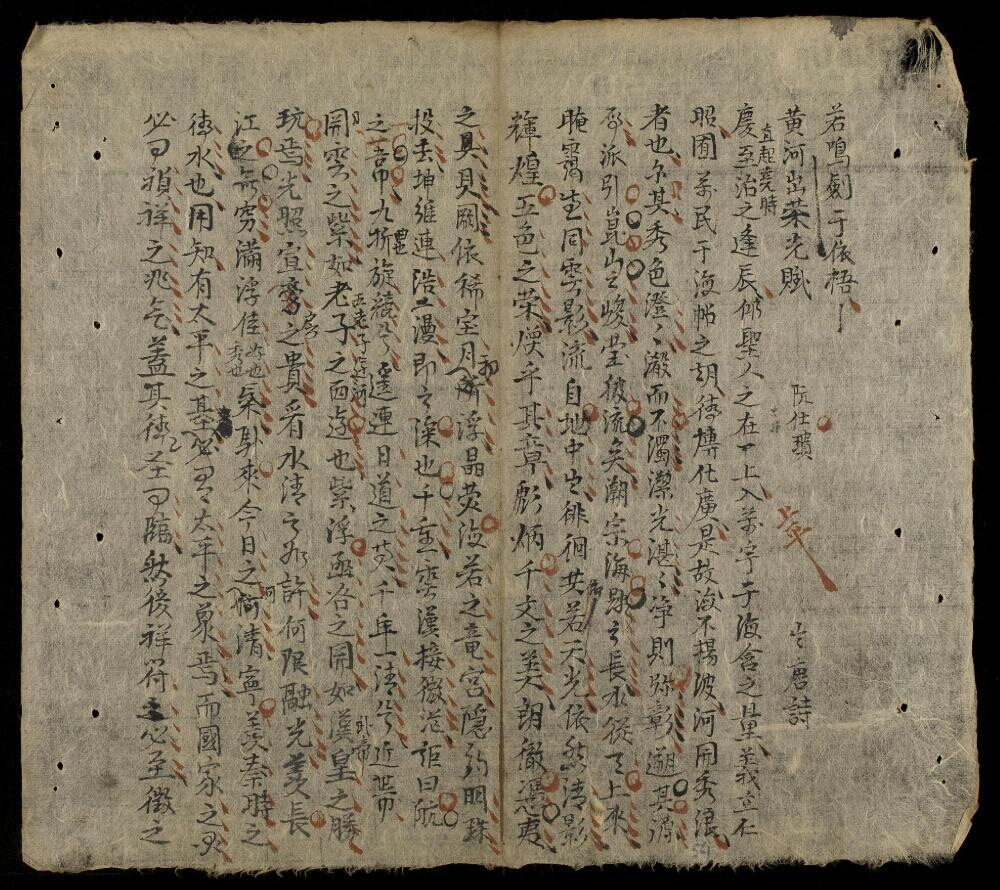
A phú 賦 written by Nguyễn Sĩ Khôi (阮仕璝) received a 上平 (thượng bình; high satisfactory) grade during the 1897 provincial examination.

As seen above, Nguyễn dynasty adopted the Lê dynasty system of four rounds (tứ trường; 四場) unlike in the Qing dynasty where there was three rounds only in provincial and metropolitan exams. The eight-legged essay style was also used in the exams during the Nguyễn dynasty, beginning in 1853, the eight-legged format became mandatory. In the provincial exams, the grade system that was used is the same as system used in the Qing dynasty:

- 優 (ưu, excellent)
- 平 (bình, satisfactory)
- 次 (thứ, poor)
- 劣 (liệt, fail)

However, the Nguyễn dynasty used a point-based system for grading papers in the metropolitan and palace exams:

- 9–10 points: 優項 (ưu hạng, excellent)
- 7–8 points: 優次 (ưu thứ, high satisfactory)
- 5–6 points: 平項 (bình hạng, satisfactory)
- 3–4 points: 平次 (bình thứ, low satisfactory)
- 1–2 points: 次項 (thứ hạng, poor)
- <1 point: 劣項 (liệt hạng, fail)

During the period of reformed imperial examinations (khoa cử cải lương; 科舉改良) that took place from 1906 to 1919, the contents of the exams were changed under French supervision. The changes are shown here:

==== 1909 provincial examination ====
1. Policy essay (Năm đạo văn sách): candidates were required to write an essay in Classical Chinese, addressing topics such as literature, ethics, geography and history of both the North (China) and the South (Vietnam), as well as contemporary political issues.
2. Classical Chinese essays: two essay topics, written in Classical Chinese.
3. Vietnamese essays: two essay topics written in the Vietnamese alphabet (chữ Quốc ngữ).
4. Two essays: one composed in Classical Chinese, the other in Vietnamese.

==== 1910 metropolitan examination ====
1. Policy essay (Mười đạo văn sách): five questions on Chinese classics, two questions on commentary, two questions on Chinese history, and one question on Vietnamese history.
2. Chế - chiếu - biểu (制-詔-表; edicts and memorials)
3. Three essays: one in Classical Chinese and two in Vietnamese.
4. Policy essay (Mười đạo văn sách): two questions on Western history, two questions on natural sciences, two questions on geography, two questions on historical figures, and two questions on current affairs.

==== 1912 provincial examination ====
1. Policy essay (Bốn đạo văn sách): candidates were required to write an essay in Classical Chinese, addressing topics such as literature, ethics, Southern history (Vietnam), and politics of the Southern court.
2. National language: an essay regarding three topics, literature, mathematics, and geography written in Vietnamese.
3. (This round was cancelled and no examination was held)
4. Two essays: one composed in Classical Chinese, the other in Vietnamese.

==== 1913 metropolitan examination ====
1. Policy essay (Năm đạo văn sách)
2. Chiếu - tấu - biểu (詔-奏-表; edicts and memorials)
3. Three essays: written in Vietnamese.
4. Policy essay (Năm đạo văn sách)

==== 1915 provincial examination ====
1. Policy essay (Ba đạo văn sách): candidates were required to write an essay in Classical Chinese, addressing topics such as literature, ethics, and politics. They were also required to translate one topic from Classical Chinese into Vietnamese.
2. National language: an essay regarding four topics, literature, history, geography, and mathematics written in Vietnamese.
3. French translation: candidates were required to translate two topics from Classical Chinese to French and French to Vietnamese.
4. One essay: composed in Classical Chinese.

==== 1916 metropolitan examination ====
- Same contents as the 1913 metropolitan examination.

==== 1919 metropolitan examination ====
1. Policy essay (Năm đạo văn sách): one question on Chinese classics, one questions on commentary, one question on current affairs, one question on Vietnamese history, and one question on Western history.
2. Chiếu - biểu - từ trát (詔-表-詞札; edicts and memorials)
3. Two questions on mathematics and one essay topic written in Vietnamese.
4. Vietnamese translation into French, French translation from Classical Chinese, and one essay topic in French.

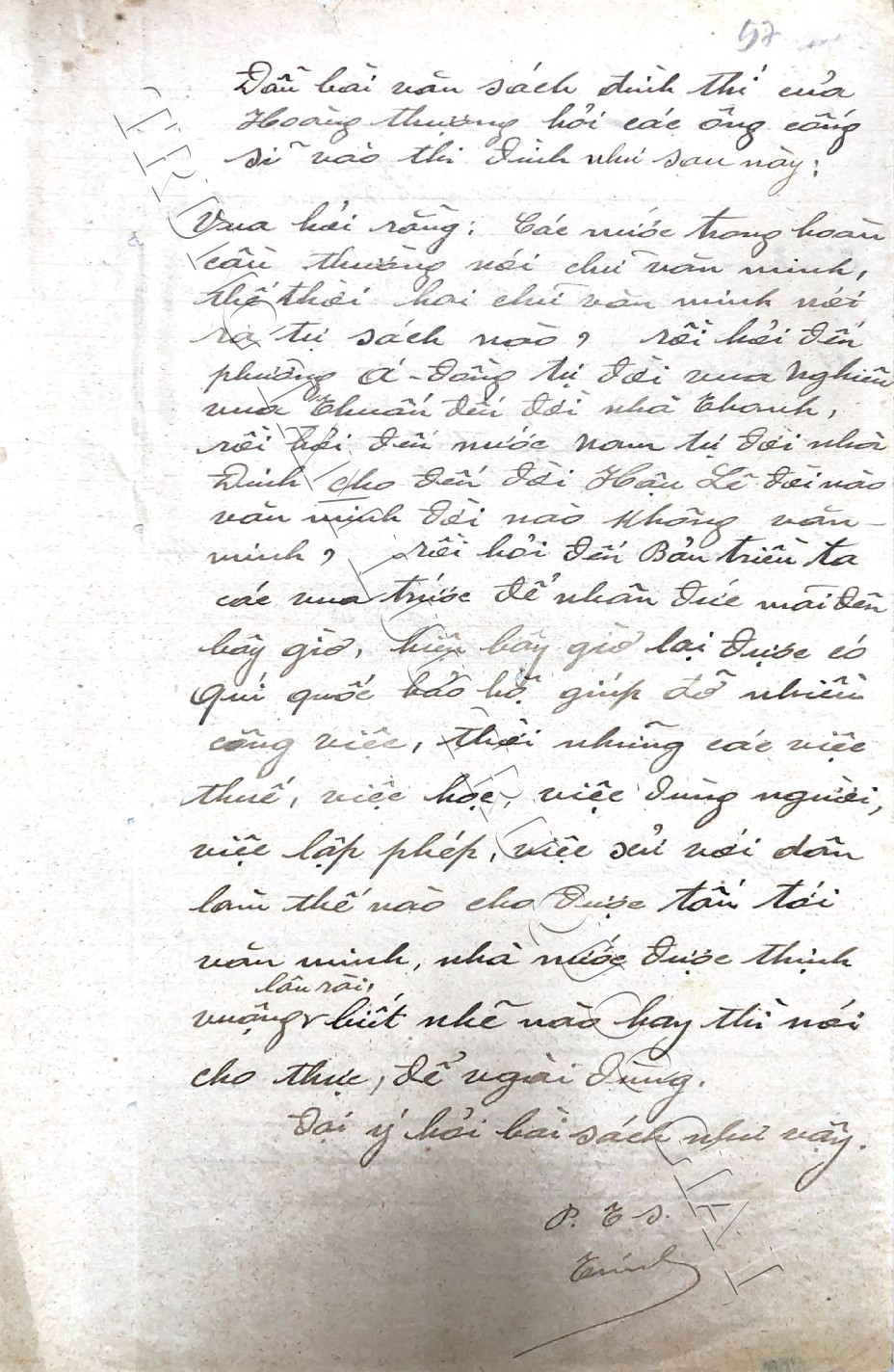
A policy essay question (văn sách) from the 1919 court examination asking cống sĩ (貢士) that all countries are judged based on if they are civilised or not. How are the two words văn minh (文明; civilization) studied in all texts?

During the 1910 court examination, a policy essay question was asked on how could one use the Book of Changes for practical purposes. The question was worded so that using Chinese classics that were obscure allowing for it to bypass French censors. It allowed for the examiners to ask candidates for commentary on the language reforms of the Tonkin Free School by comparing it with situations of some hexagrams.

The examinations were suspended by the French in 1913 with the last local exams occurring from 1915 to 1919, thus making Vietnam the last country to hold Confucian civil service examinations.

== Exam procedures ==
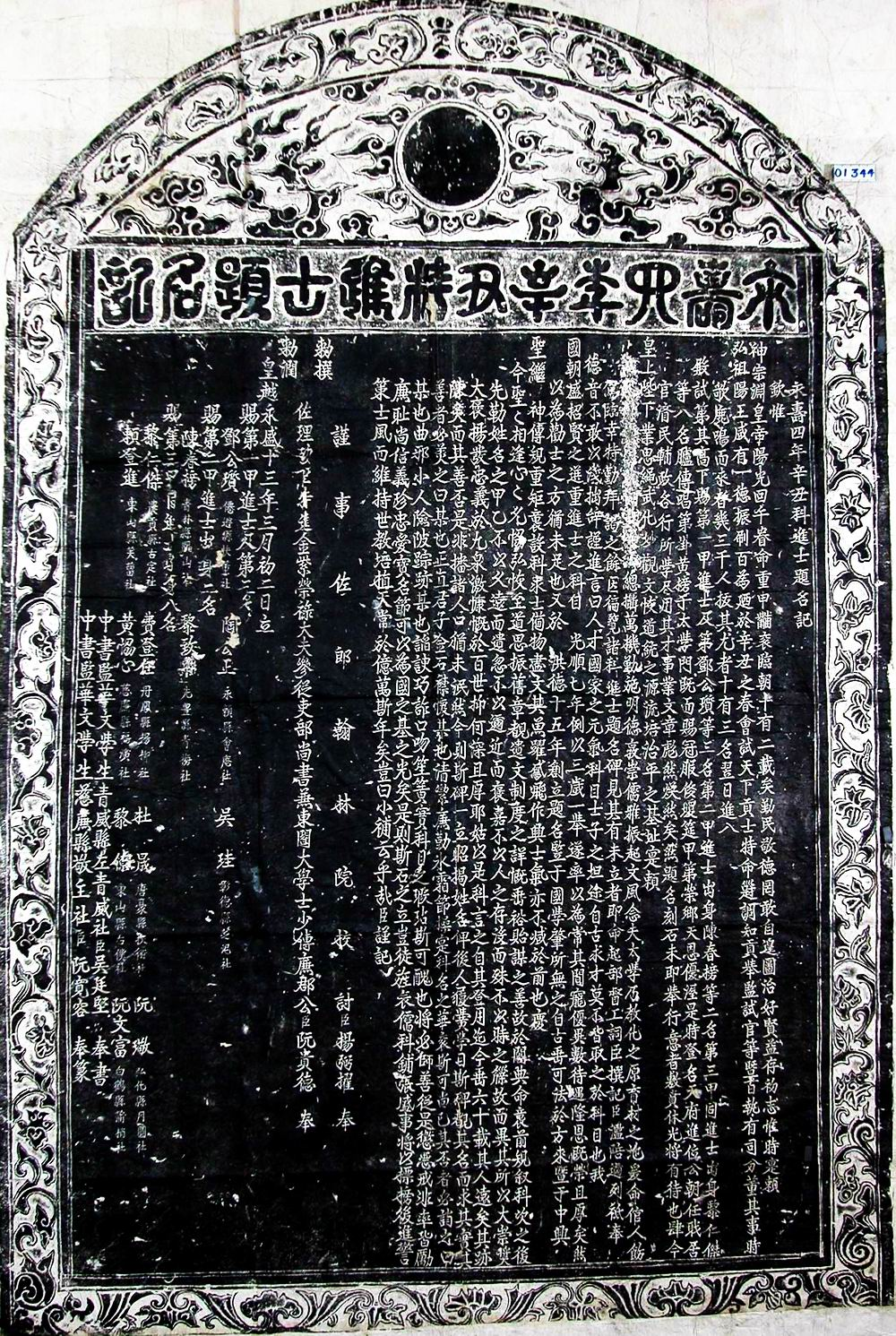
A stele at the Temple of Literature recording the graduates of the 1661 metropolitan and court examinations during the Lê dynasty. Approximately 3,000 candidates gathered in the capital to sit for the examination. Three candidates attained the highest distinction of First-Rank Doctoral Laureate (Đệ nhất giáp Tiến sĩ cập đệ), Đặng Công Chất (鄧公瓆), Đào Công Chính (陶公正), and Ngô Khuê (吳珪).

During the Nguyễn dynasty, the examination system was divided into three examinations, this included thi Hương (試鄉; provincial examination), thi Hội (試會; metropolitan examination), and thi Đình (試廷; court examination).

Candidates had to pass all three rounds in order to qualify for the final review round (覆核; phúc hạch).

The provincial examinations awarded only the degrees of tú tài (秀才; licentiate)/sinh đồ (生徒), and cử nhân (舉人; local laureate). Starting in 1822, those who attained the cử nhân degree became eligible to advance to the lowest tier of the metropolitan examinations, where the minimum achievable title was tiến sĩ (進士; metropolitan laureate). The top candidates of the triennial examinations are referred to as Giải nguyên (解元), Hội nguyên (會元), and Đình nguyên (廷元) respectively.

In addition to accrediting scholars for civil service appointments drawn from successful provincial candidates, the examination system also selected top scholars for the court examination (thi Đình) held in the capital. The highest distinction, trạng nguyên, was awarded to the first-ranked candidate. This title was first awarded to Lê Văn Thịnh (d.1096). Beginning in 1247, the court examinations adopted a three-tiered first-class ranking system modeled after the Chinese model, with trạng nguyên as the top prize. Under this system, the first scholar to receive the title was Nguyễn Hiền. As a result, the total number of trạng nguyên titleholders is 55 when counted from Lê Văn Thịnh, but only 49 when counted from Nguyễn Hiền, who received the title in 1247 during the reign of Trần Thái Tông.

The three titles were as follows :

- Trạng nguyên (狀元) – first place, reserved for the best scholar
- Bảng nhãn (榜眼) – second place
- Thám hoa (探花) – third place
- Tiến sĩ (進士) – all the other successful applicants

Several terms rooted from the civil service examination are used today to refer to academic terms such as 'bachelor' as cử nhân (舉人), 'doctorate' as tiến sĩ (進士), a postsecondary student as sinh viên (生員), etc.

The list of trạng nguyên includes several notable figures in Vietnam's history, such as Mạc Đĩnh Chi (awarded 1304, in the reign of Trần Anh Tông) and Nguyễn Bỉnh Khiêm (awarded 1535, in the reign of Mạc Thái Tông). The last trạng nguyên was awarded to Trịnh Tuệ in 1736 during the reign of Lê Ý Tông.

=== Attire ===
In volume 108 of Khâm định Đại Nam hội điển sự lệ (欽定大南會典事例), records the regulations for the examination ceremonial attire. Cử nhân (舉人) were required to wear southern silk gauze hats (冠用南羅紗; quan dụng nam la sa). Tú tài were required to wear wangjin (網巾; võng cân), cross-collar shirt also made of southern silk gauze (南羅紗交領; nam la sa giao lĩnh), a high cloth round-collared robe (高布帛圓領; cao bố bạch viên lĩnh), and a blue silk skirt (藍帛裳; lam miên thường). Examination officials will bestow new Cống sĩ (貢士) with a scholar cap. While, Tiến sĩ (進士) were required to wear black gauze caps (烏紗帽; ô sa mạo), decorated with gold and silver flowers (金銀花; kim ngân hoa). They were required to wear a wangjin (網巾; võng cân). The robes were white silk (白色羅紗; bạch sắc la sa) with blue skirt (藍裳; lam thường) They carried wooden tablets, wore leather belts, and boots.

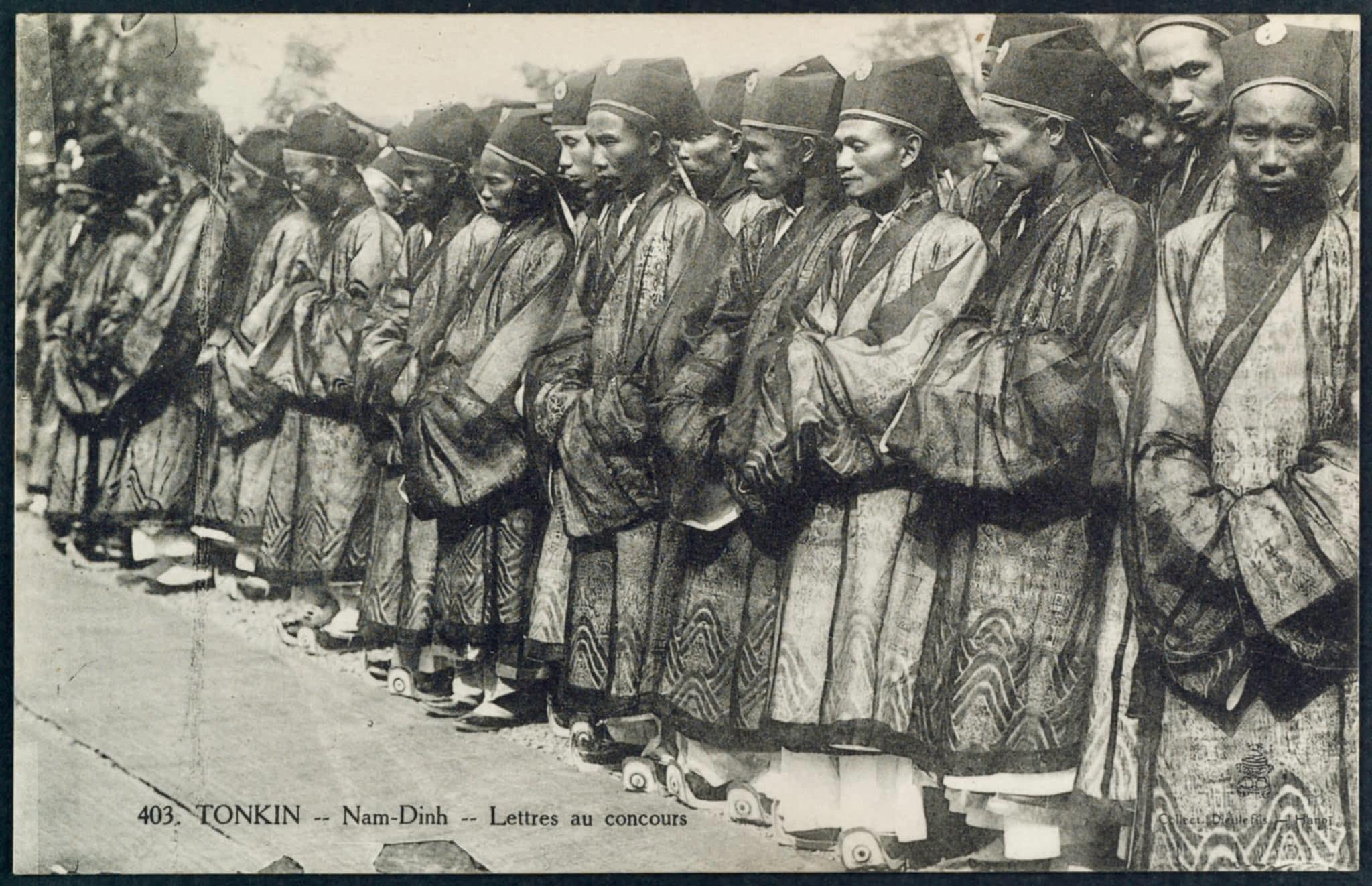
Tú tài graduates wearing áo giao lĩnh during the ceremony.

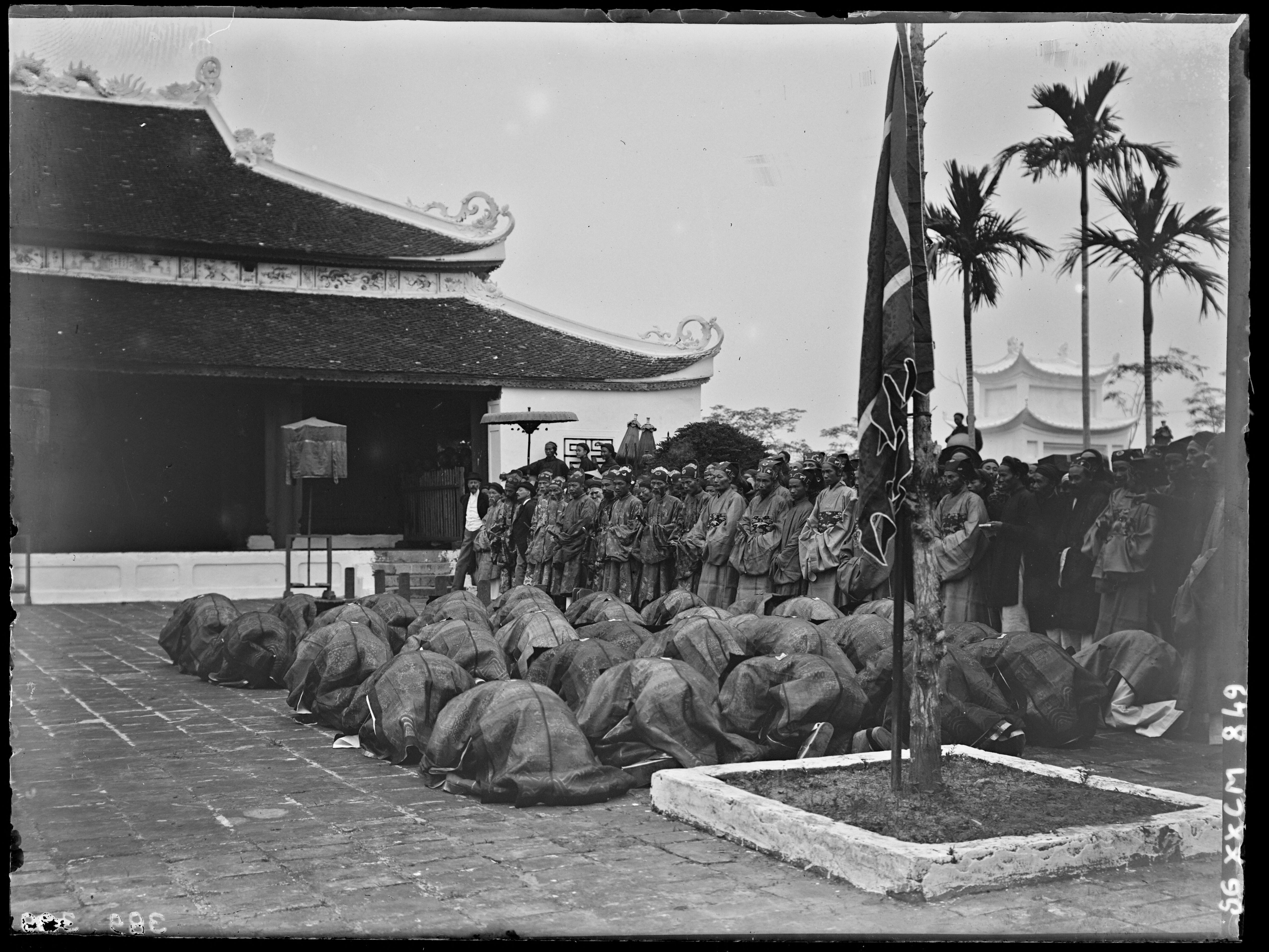
Tú tài graduates kowtowing to the shrine. They also paid respects to examiners and local officials.

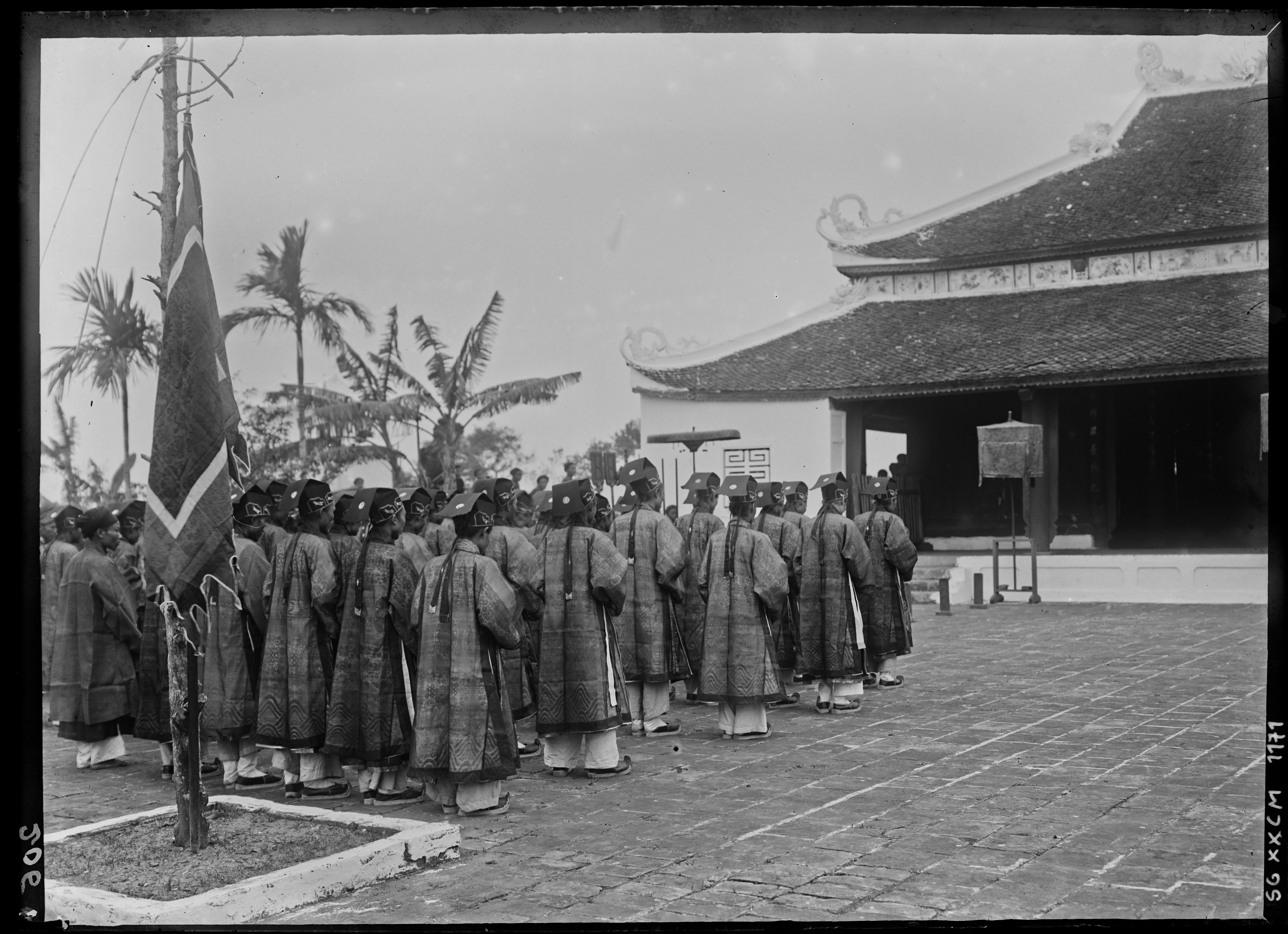
Tú tài graduates participating in a ritual to pay respects.

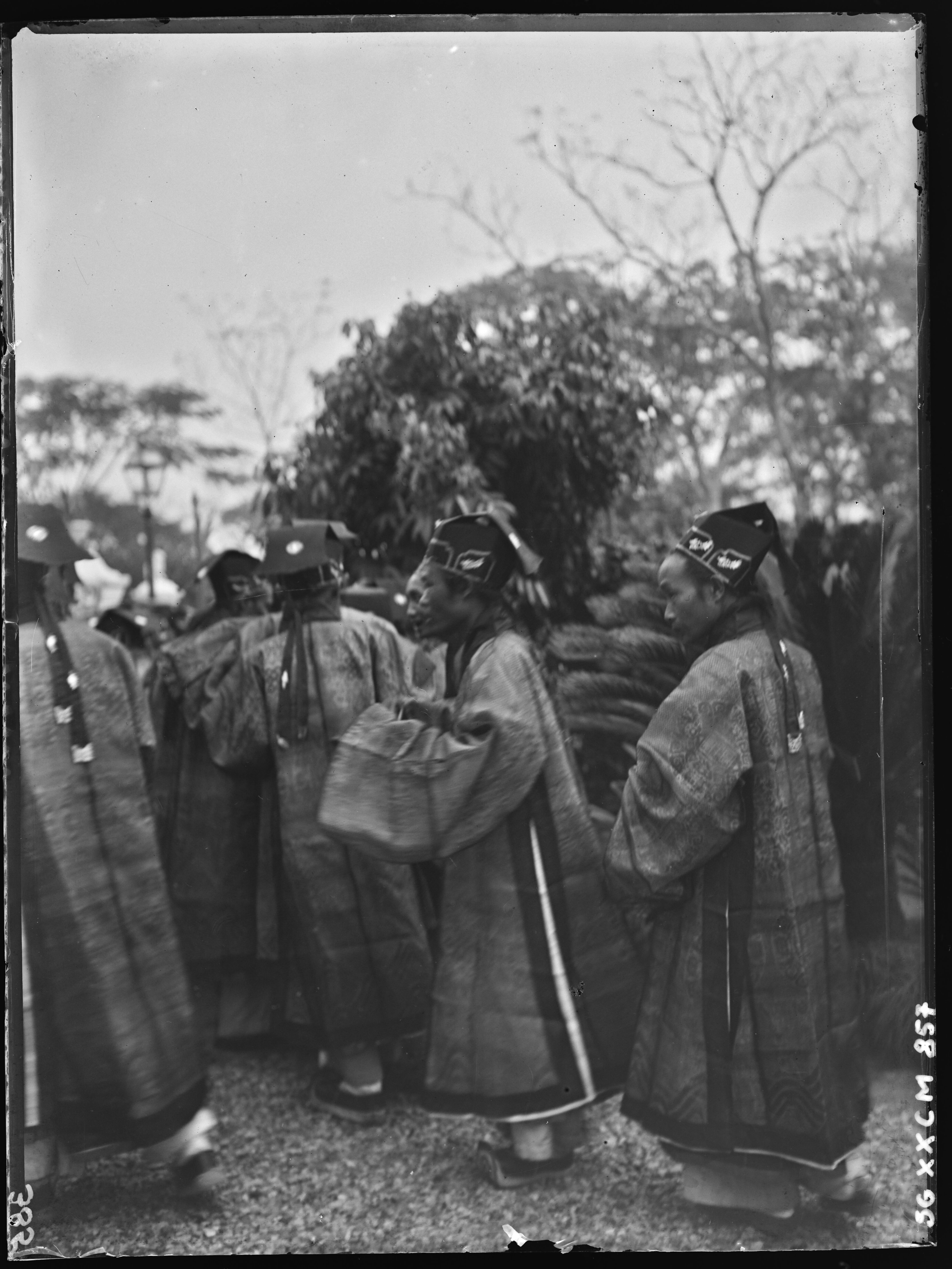
Tú tài graduates walking to their places for the ceremony.

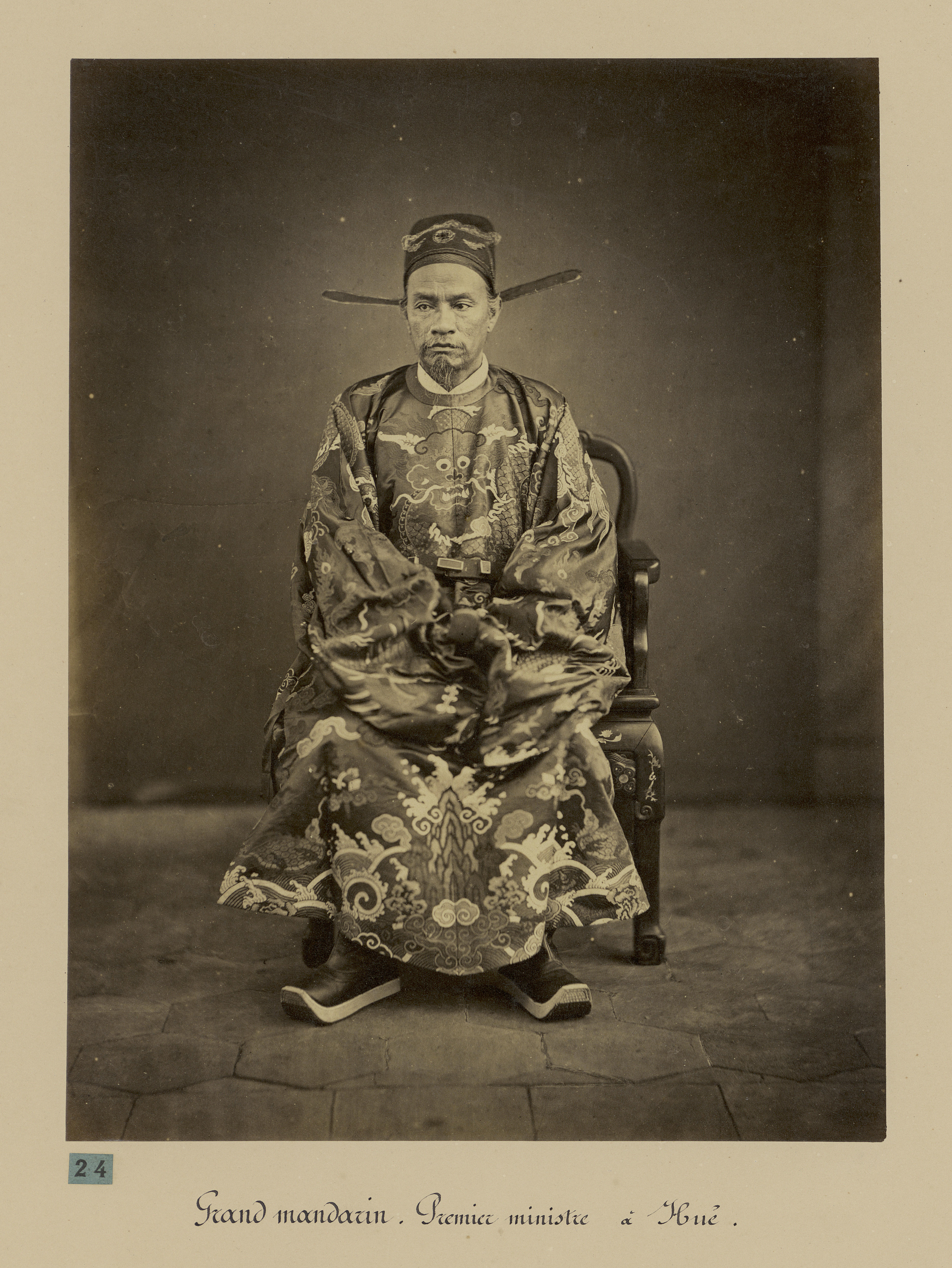
Nguyễn Văn Tường, a mandarin of the Nguyễn dynasty can be seen wearing a wangjin (網巾; võng cân) under his hat.

=== Examination hall ===
Examination halls for provincial examinations were often temporary and dismantled after the examinations end. In the Lê dynasty, the cubicles that candidates stayed in were later changed to bamboo cages. Candidates were seated according to name order. The cages were approximately 1.2 meters high (三尺; tam xích) and 1.6 meters wide (四尺; tứ xích). In the Nguyễn dynasty, the bamboo cages were replaced by a type of tent called a lều chõng. The tent consisted of a chõng which was a low bamboo pallet covered by a lều, a tent with a thatched roof. Each cubicle was standardised to be 1 tầm high (尋) and 1 tầm wide (尋).

Until 1840, elephants were used to guard examination halls. This was done for two reasons, (1) to highlight the importance of the examinations (2) to help suppress cheating during the exam.

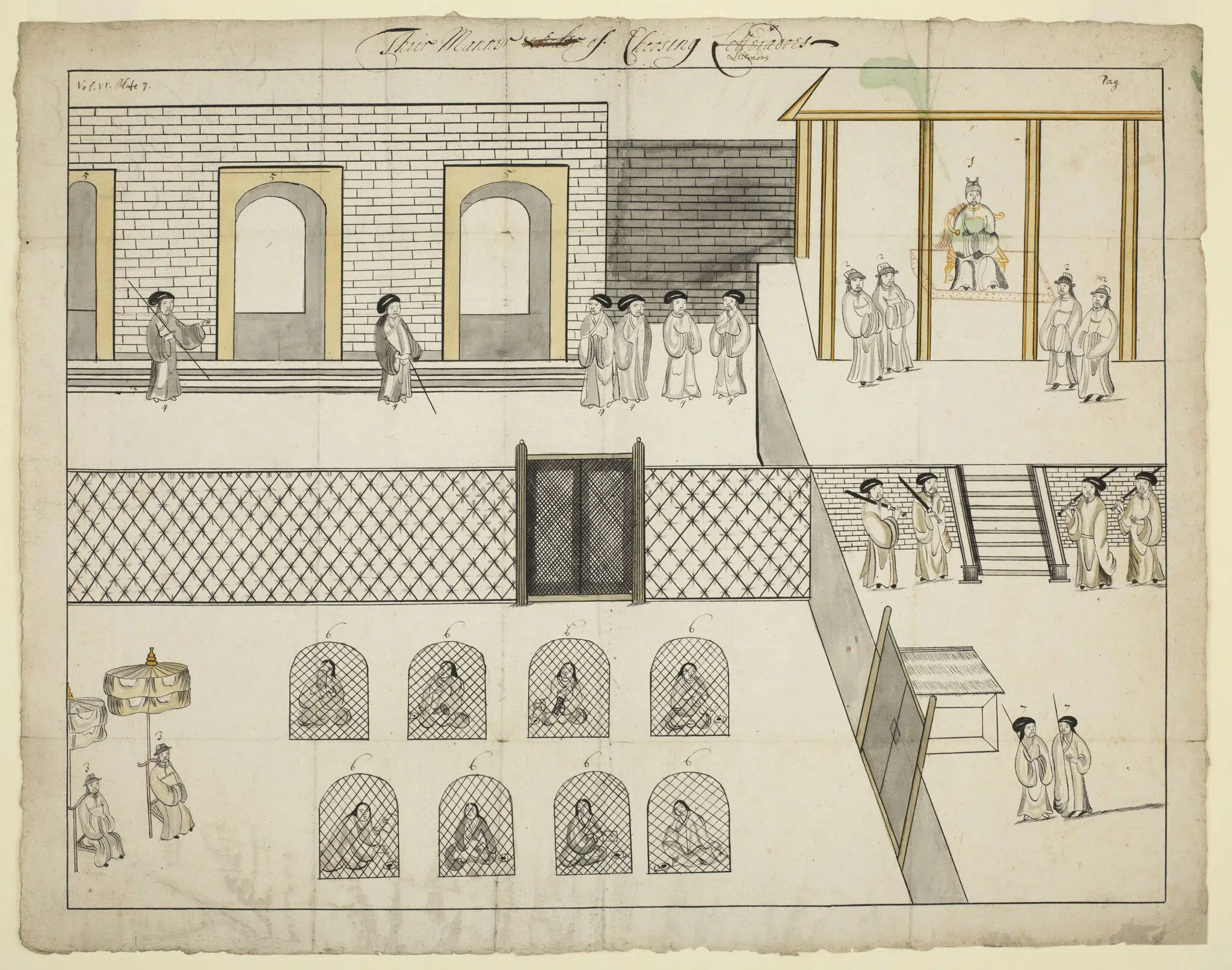
A depiction of provincial examination (1684-1685) during the Lê dynasty in Samuel Baron's book, A Description of the Kingdom of Tonqueen. Candidates are shown to be encased in bamboo cages.

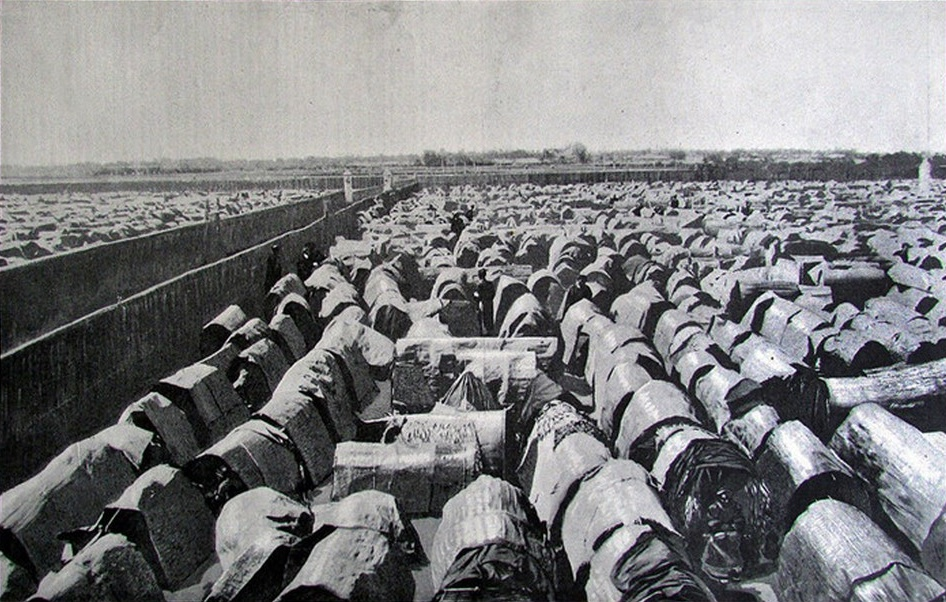
Multiple lều chõng can be seen here during the 1900 provincial examination exams.

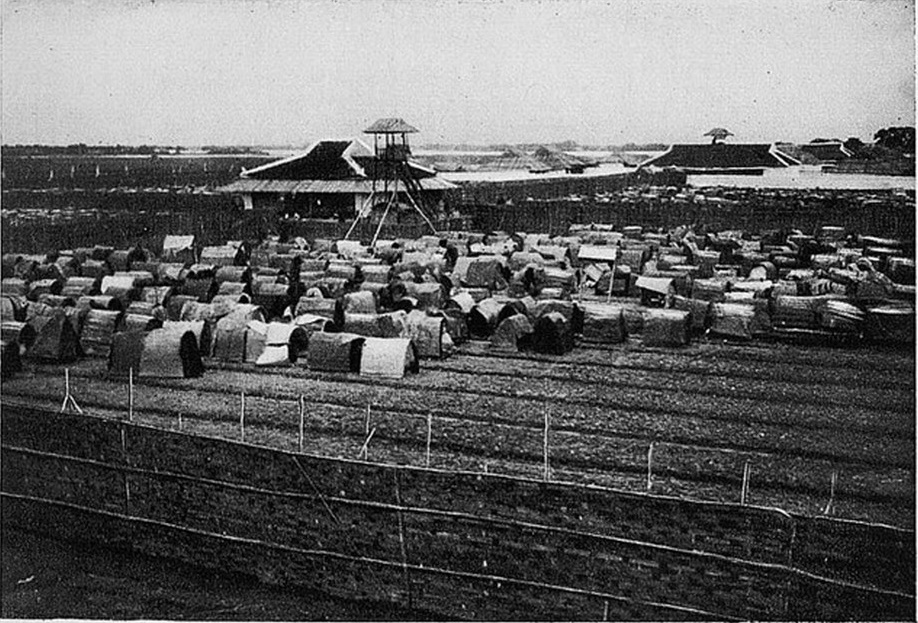
Candidates taking the exam inside lều chõng.

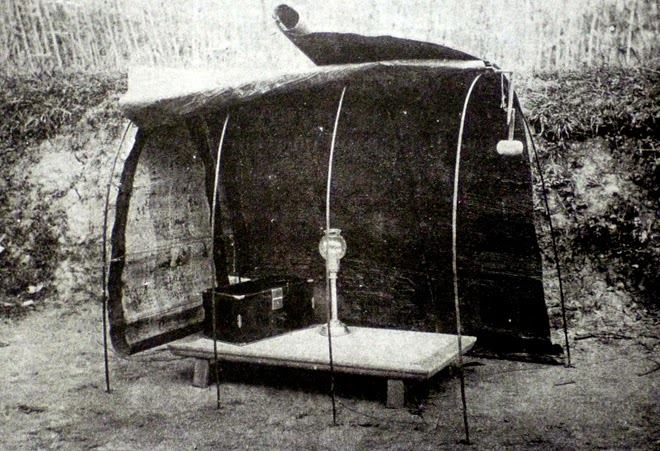
The inside of a lều chõng during an examination.

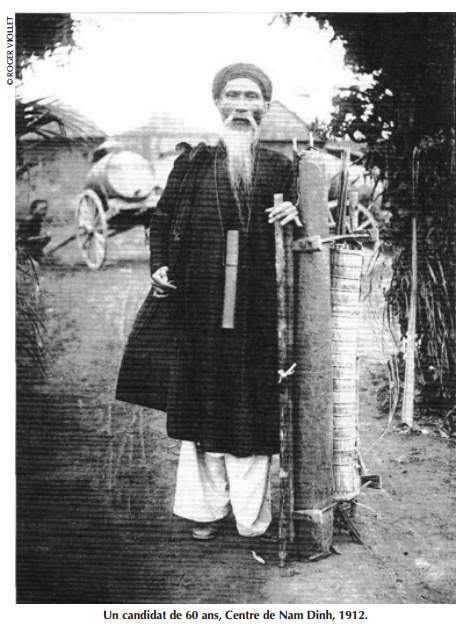
A sixty-year old candidate with his tent. Candidates were required to build their own tents.

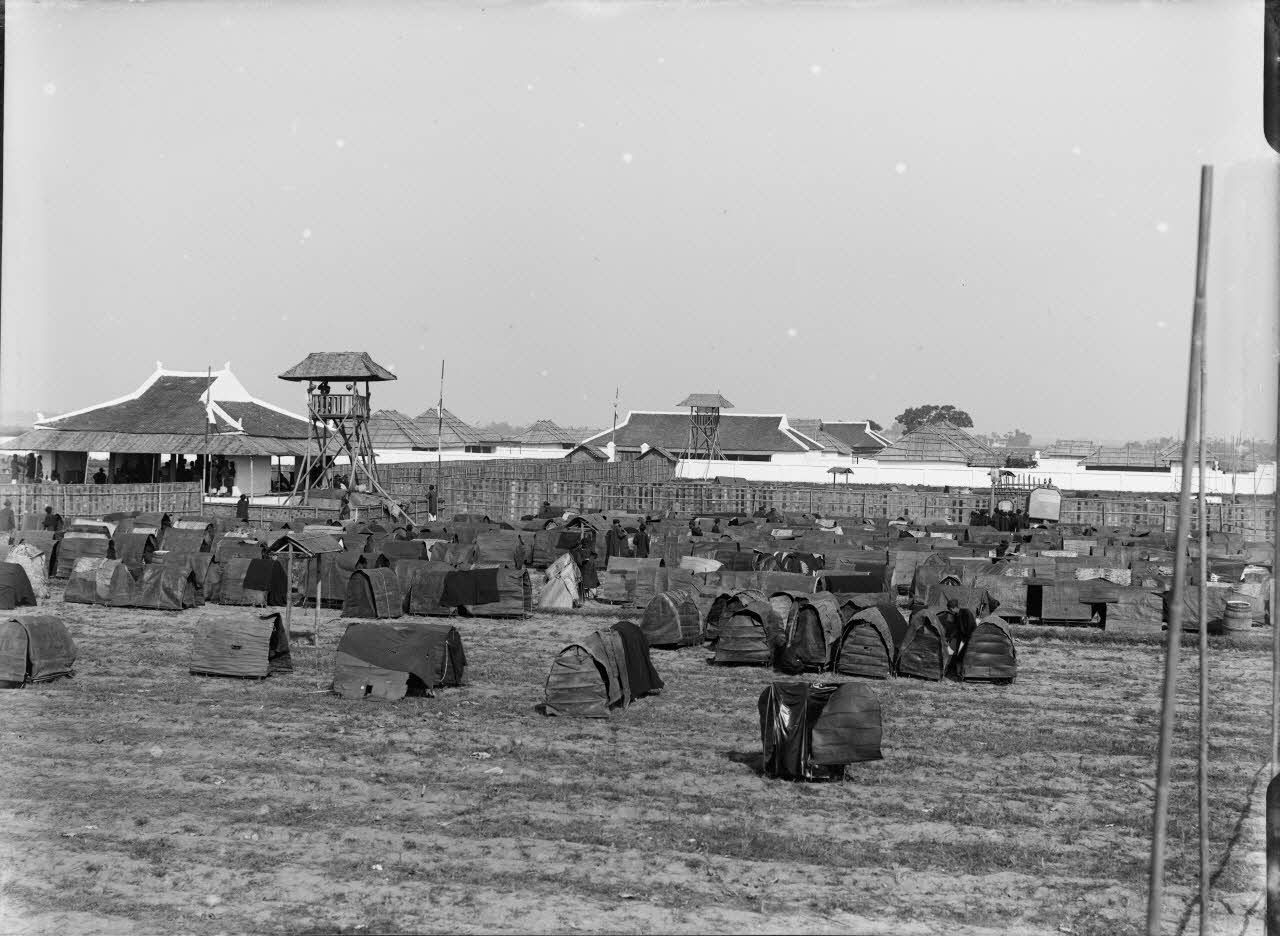
Lều chõng during the 1908 provincial examination exams.

== Example essay ==
The book, Hà Nam hương thí văn tuyển (河南鄕試文選; 1900) which contains an anthology of selected essays and information about the candidates from the 1900 provincial examination in Hà Nam. There were in total 90 people who passed and became cử nhân (舉人; local laureate).

Essays were typically followed the style of eight-legged essay (八股文; bát cổ văn).

The first round exam topic (Đệ nhất trường đề mục; 第壹場題目):

- 天地之大德曰生 (Thiên địa chi đại đức viết sinh) - The great virtue of Heaven and Earth is called life. (Note: This particular topic is an excerpt from Xici (繫辭) typically included with the Book of Changes (周易). The other parts of the topic: 于帝其訓 (vu đế kỳ huấn) 韎韐有奭以作六師 (muội cáp hữu thích dĩ tác lục sư) 劳農以休息之 (lao nông dĩ hưu tức chi) 同盟于幽 (đồng minh vu u) 而后民法之也 (nhi hậu dân pháp chi dã) 孰能一之 (thục năng nhất chi)) Candidates had to identify and state where this quotation is from.

Here is an excerpt from the first essay.

《易》即易以見天地。其大𱐩可寔指焉。夫大𱐩曰生知天地有造化也。寔以指之。不已見与易相𫔭哉…品物章焉不惟氣之具於人者。形各自全。即至𢒎潜動植…萬物通焉。𱍺論理之賦於人者。性各以正。𨿽至大小髙下得是理以自完。則天地之𱐩不可見。而明指之曰生…進𳁓圣人而与易相𫔭益信矣。

Dịch: tức dịch dĩ kiến thiên địa. Kỳ đại đức khả thực chỉ yên. Phù đại đức viết sinh tri thiên địa hữu tạo hoá dã. Thực dĩ chỉ chi. Bất dĩ kiến dữ Dịch tương khai tai... Phẩm vật chương yên bất duy khí chi cụ ư nhân giả, hình các tự toàn, tức chí phi tiềm động thực... Vạn vật thông yên. Vô luận lý chi phú ư nhân giả. Tính các dĩ chính. Tuy chí đại tiểu cao hạ đắc thị lý dĩ tự hoàn. Tắc thiên địa chi đức bất khả kiến. Nhi minh chỉ chi viết sinh... Tiến quan thánh nhân nhi dữ Dịch tương khai ích tín hĩ.

Book of Changes: by approaching the Yì (Changes), one can perceive Heaven and Earth. Through it the workings of Heaven and Earth can be seen. Its great virtue (大徳) can truly be pointed out. That great virtue (大徳) is called life (生); therefore one comes to understand that Heaven and Earth has the power of creation (造化). It is truly through this that we point to it. Is it not already revealed together with the Yijing (易)? ... All categories of beings are arranged in order; it is not only humans who are endowed with qi (氣). Each form is complete in itself, even down to the birds and fish, the animals and the plants... All things are connected through it. Not to mention the principle (理) that is bestowed to human beings. Each living being’s nature is proper. Even the great and small, the high and low, all attain this principle (理) and complete themselves. Then, although the virtue of Heaven and Earth cannot be seen, it clearly points to the name life (生)...When we go further to observe the sages, and see that they are in mutual accord with the Yijing (易), our trust in it is increased.

== Gallery ==
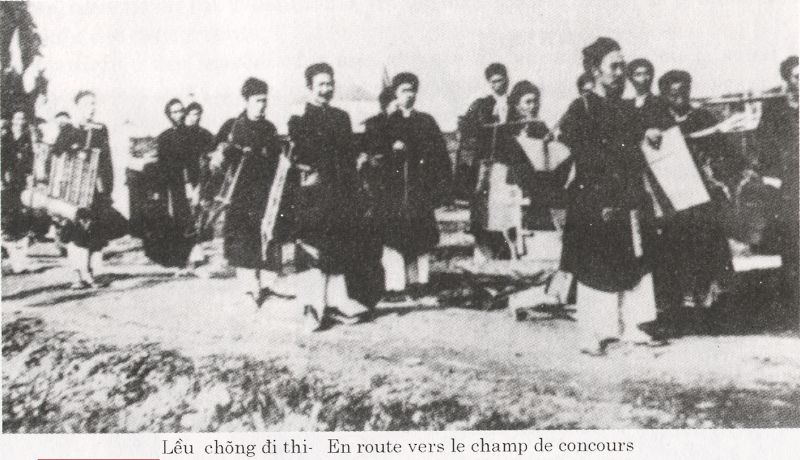
Candidates on the way to examination hall (1897).

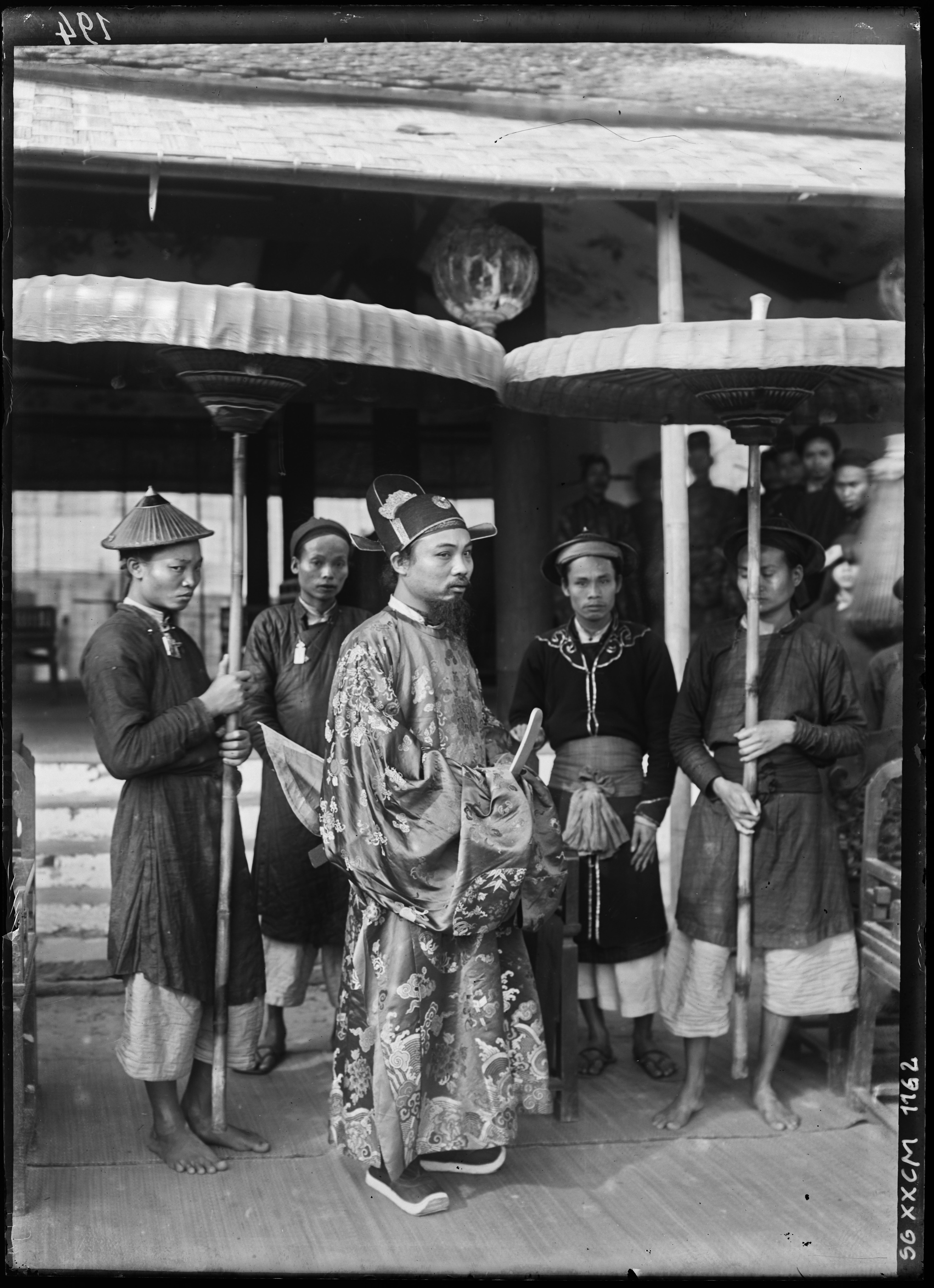
Cao Xuân Tiếu (高春肖), an invigilator of the 1897 Nam Định provincial examination.

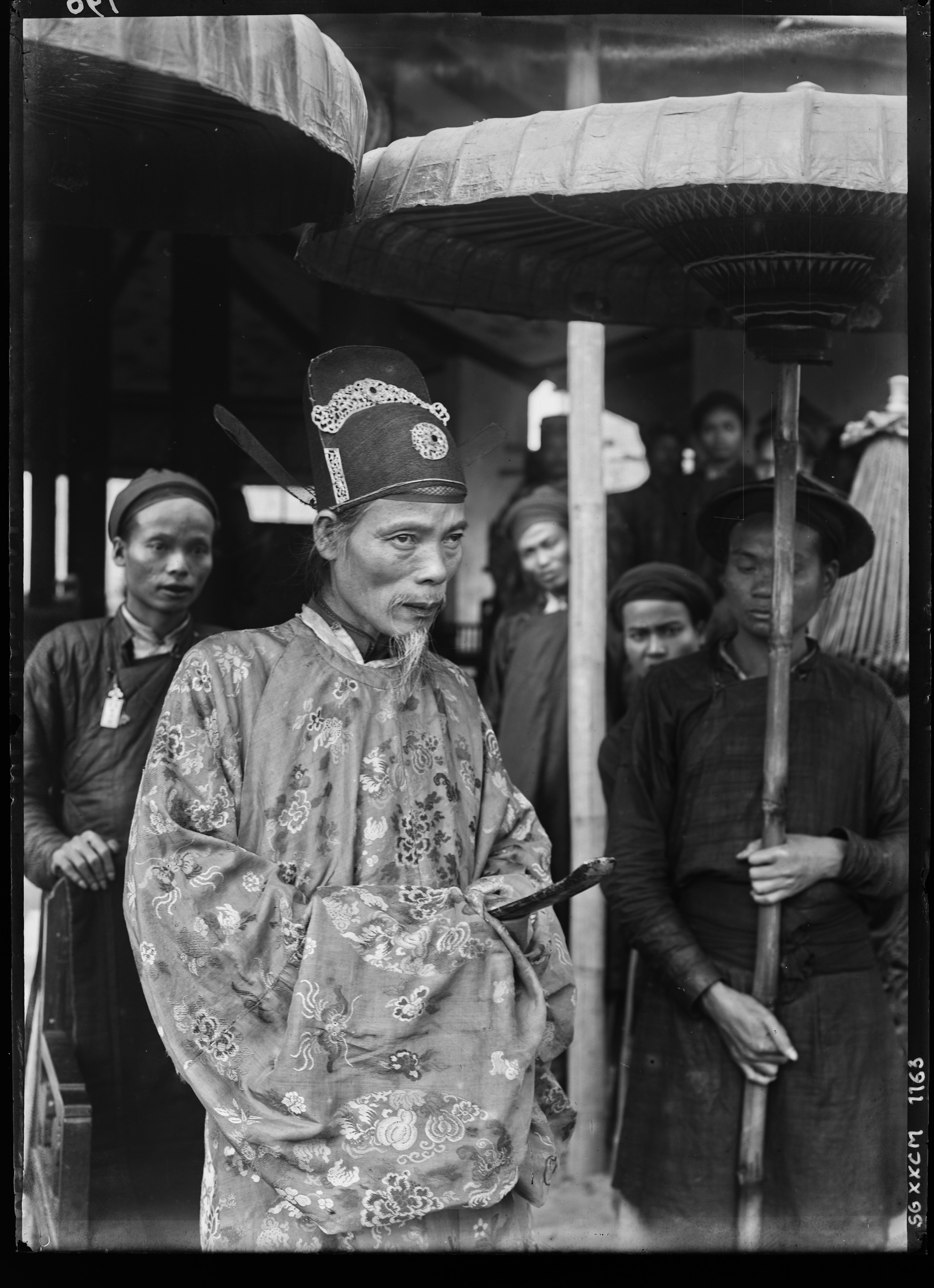
Invigilator Trần Sĩ Trác (陳士琢), he was famous for being a strict examiner.

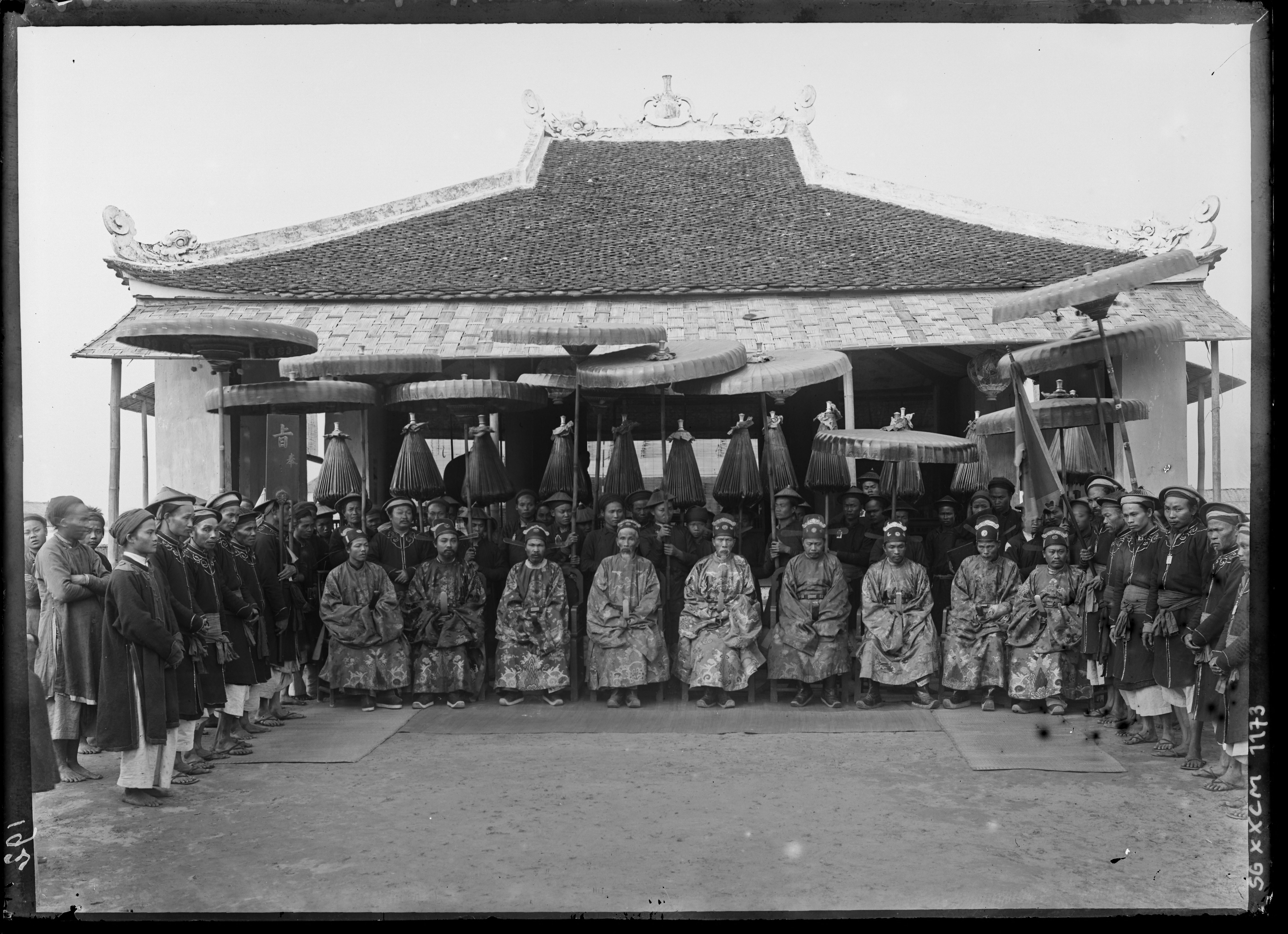
The panel of examiners of the 1897 Nam Định provincial examination.

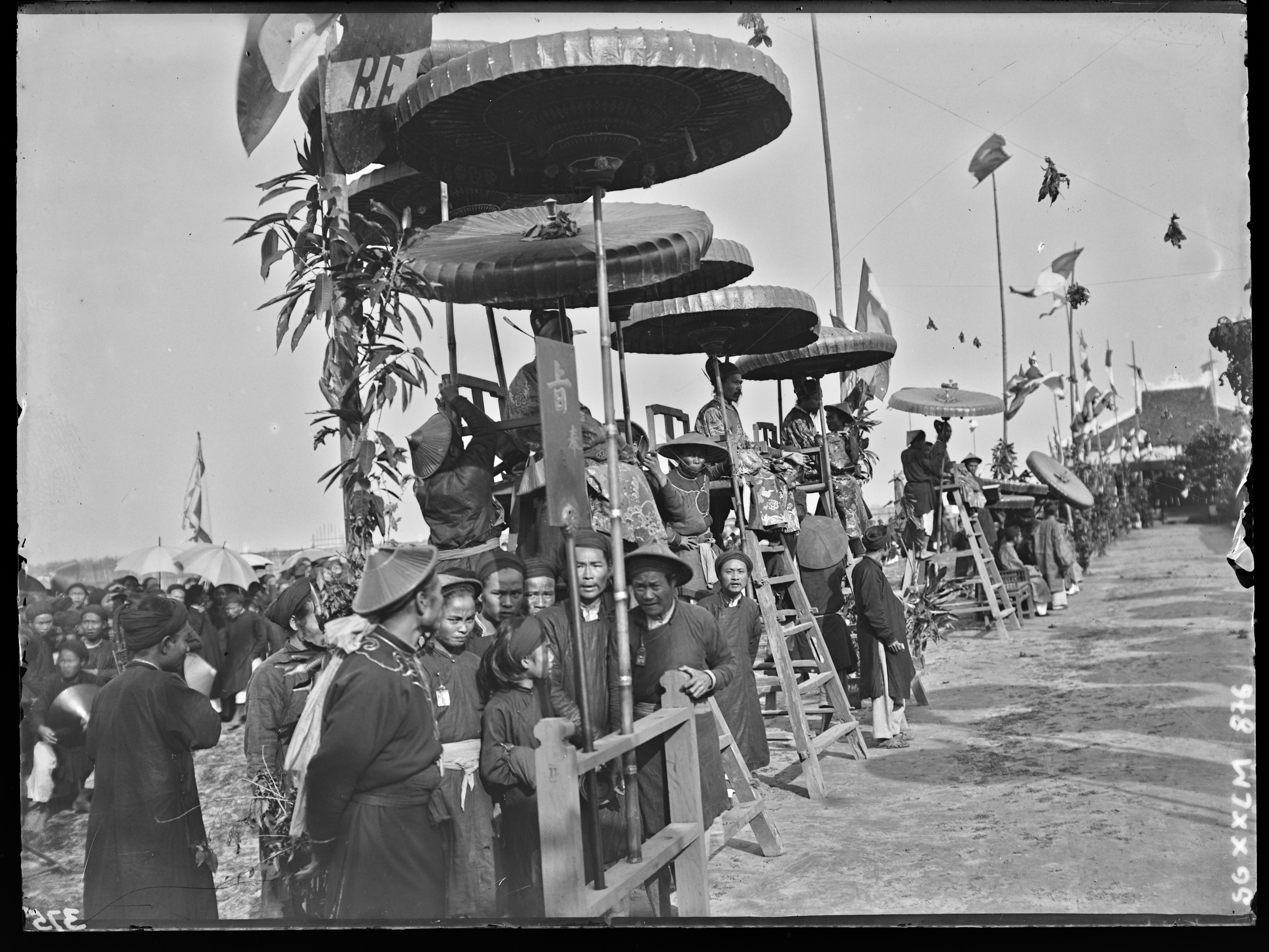
Examiners lined up to receive the greetings of the successful candidates.

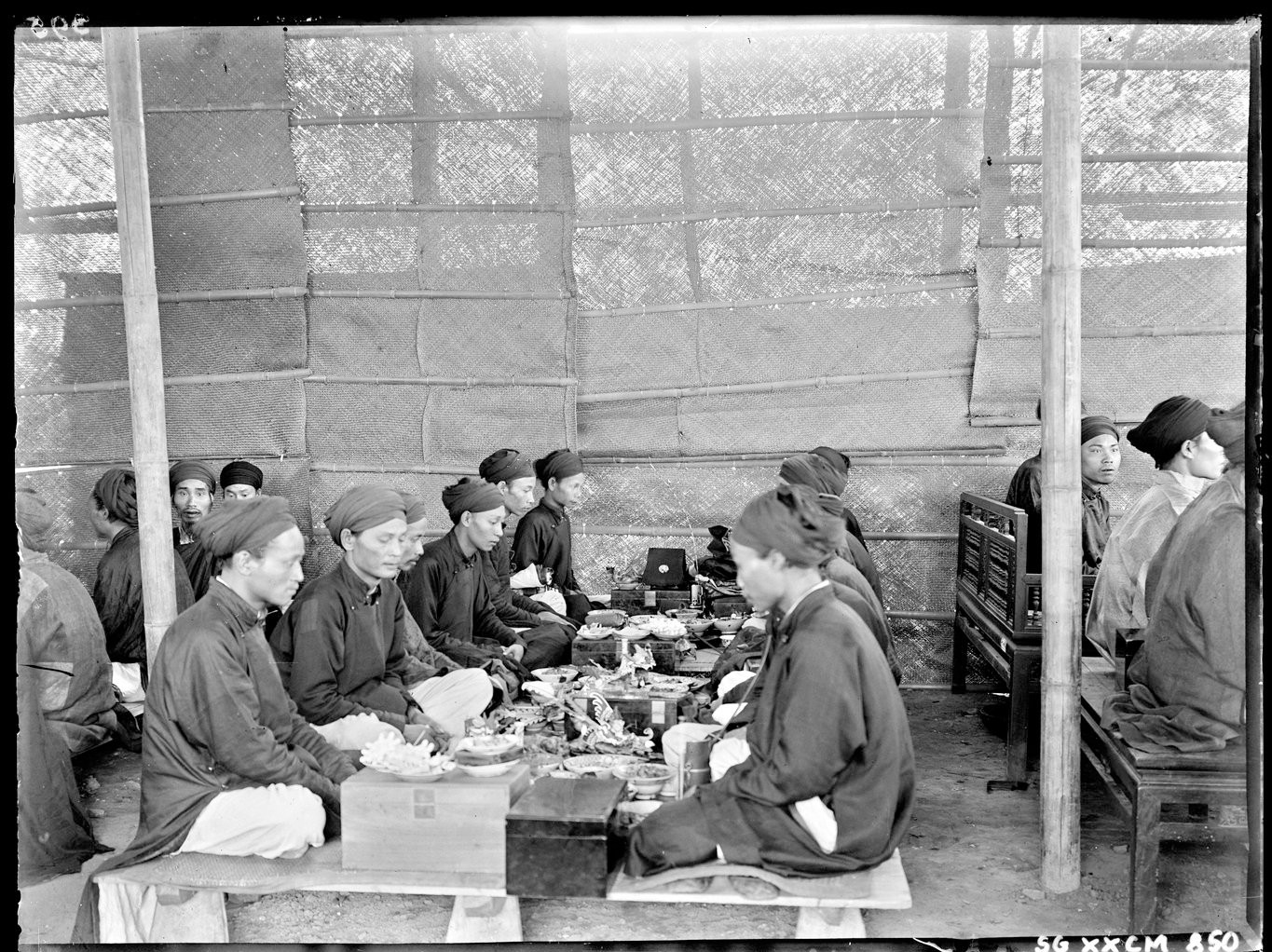
Cử nhân in ceremonial banquet hosted by the local governor (Tổng đốc) during the Nam Định examination (1897).

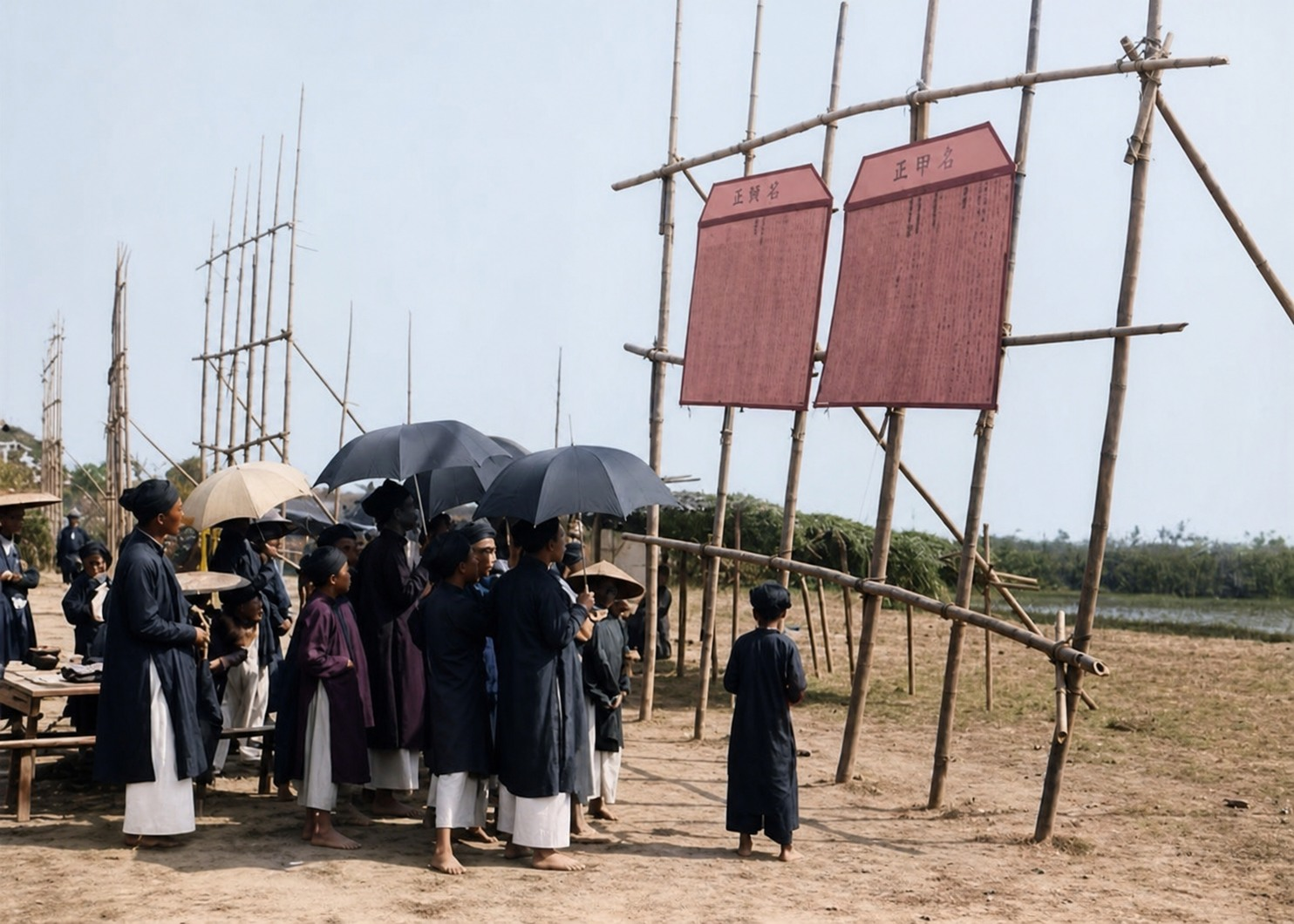
Candidates checking their names on result boards.

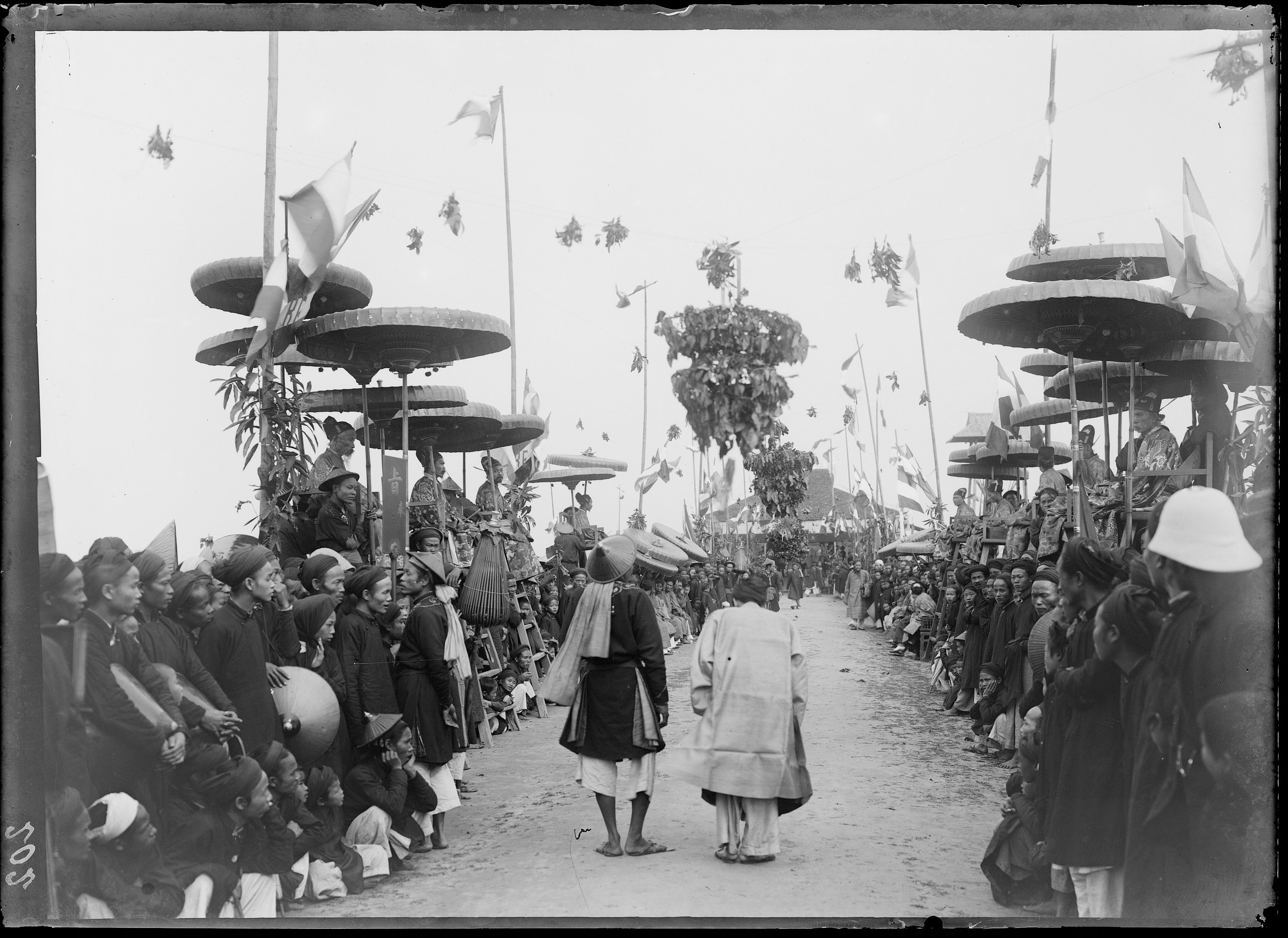
The successful candidates marching past the judges in the Hương exam in Nam Định in 1897

== See also ==
- Imperial examination
- Eight-legged essay
- Four Books and Five Classics
- Gwageo
