= Heritage of Xiguan =

Numerous designated cultural heritage sites are located in Xiguan, China.

== National Cultural Heritage Sites ==
There are two Major Sites Protected at the National Level in Xiguan:

- Architectural complex on Shamian Island (Chinese: 沙面建築群)
- Chen Clan Academy (Chinese: 陳家祠)

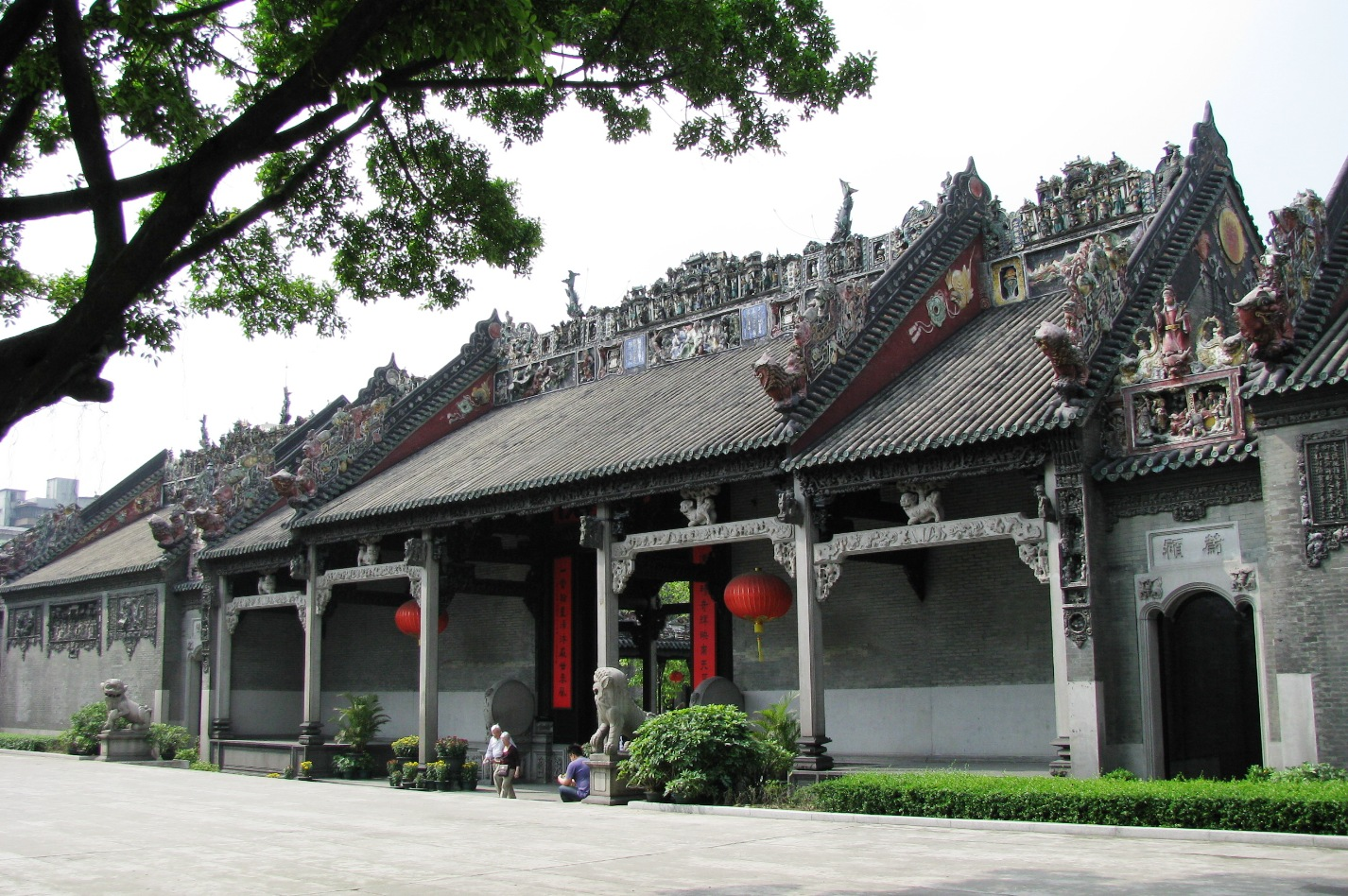
Chen Clan Academy

== Provincial Cultural Heritage Sites ==
There are 3 Provincial Cultural Heritages in Xiguan:

- Guangya Academy (Chinese: 廣雅書院)
- Guangdong Postal Building (Chinese: 廣東郵務大樓)
- Guangdong Customs House (Chinese: 粵海關大樓)

== Municipal Cultural Heritage Sites ==
There are 13 Municipal Cultural Heritages in Xiguan:

- Hall of the Arhats in Hualin Temple (Chinese: 華林寺羅漢堂)
- Martyrs Memorial Monument of Shaji Massacre (Chinese: 沙基慘案烈士紀念碑)
- Renwei Temple (Chinese: 仁威廟)
- Old pawnshop on Huagui Lu (Chinese: 華貴路舊當鋪)
- Taihua Building (Chinese: 泰華樓)
- Xiguan Residences (Chinese: 西關大屋建築)
- Archaeological site of Barbican and West City Gate of Guangzhou in Ming Dynasty (Ximenkou or West Gate) (Chinese: 廣州明代西城門甕城遺址(西門口))
- Jinlun Guild Hall (Chinese: 錦綸會館)
- Nanfang Building (or Nanfang Mansion) (Chinese: 南方大廈)
- Old pawnshop on Zhongshan Qilu (Chinese: 中山七路舊當鋪)
- Old residential buildings (Chinese: 舊民居建築)
- Huang Baojian's stone house (Chinese: 黃寶堅石屋)
- Five-mouthed Wells (Chinese: 五眼井)

=== Hualin Temple ===
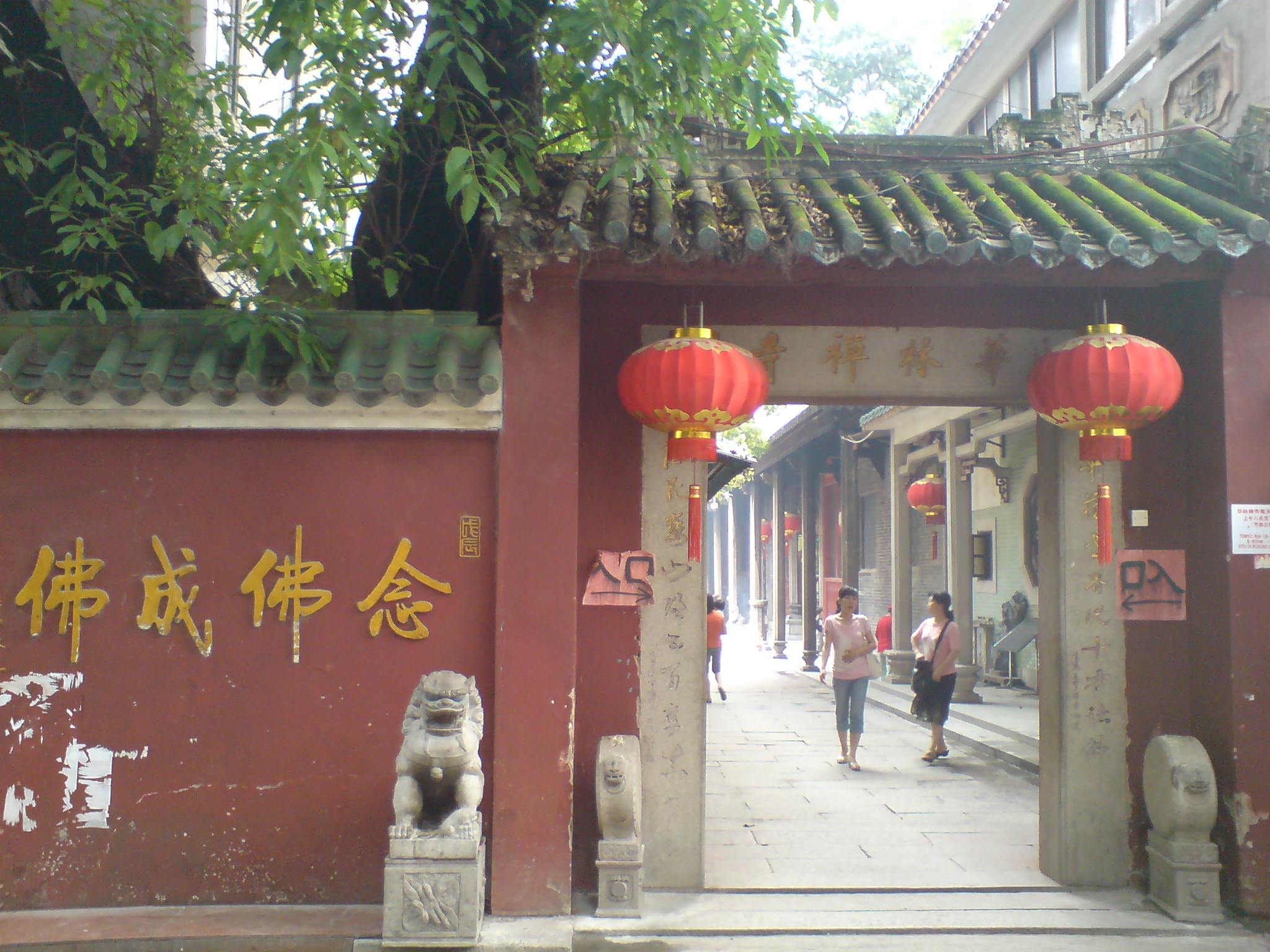
Main entrance of Hualin Temple

Hualin Temple (Chinese: 華林寺; pinyin: Huálín Sì; Jyutping: Waa4 Lam4 Zi2) is located in Hualinsi Qianjie (Chinese: 華林寺前街; pinyin: Huálínsì Qiánjiē; Jyutping: Waa4 Lam4 Zi2 Cin4 Gaai1; lit. 'Hualin Temple Frontstreet'), Xilai Chudi (Chinese: 西來初地; pinyin: Xīlái Chūdì; Jyutping: Sai1 Loi4 Co1 Dei6-2; lit. 'The first place where a monk from the West (i.e.', 'Bodhidharma) arrived'), Xiajiu Lu (Chinese: 下九路; pinyin: Xiàjiǔ Lù; Jyutping: Haa6 Gau2 Lou6; lit. 'Lower 9th Rd.'). Its predecessor was Xilai Buddhist Convent (Chinese: 西來庵; pinyin: Xīlái Ān; Jyutping: Sai1 Loi4 Am1), set up during Emperor Wu of Liang (Chinese: 梁武帝) years (20s, 6th century), Southern and Northern Dynasties (Chinese: 南北朝) by an Indian eminent monk, Bodhidharma (Chinese: 達摩), after he set up an altar to preach Buddhism. In 1655 (12th year of Shunzhi Emperor (Chinese: 順治帝), Qing Dynasty), Zen Master Zongfu (Chinese: 宗符禪師) initiated its rehabilitation and changed its name to Hualin Temple. There used to be an Gilded Ashoka Pagoda (Chinese: 阿育王塔) and 500 Arhats' statues (Chinese: 五百羅漢像) but some of them were destroyed afterwards.

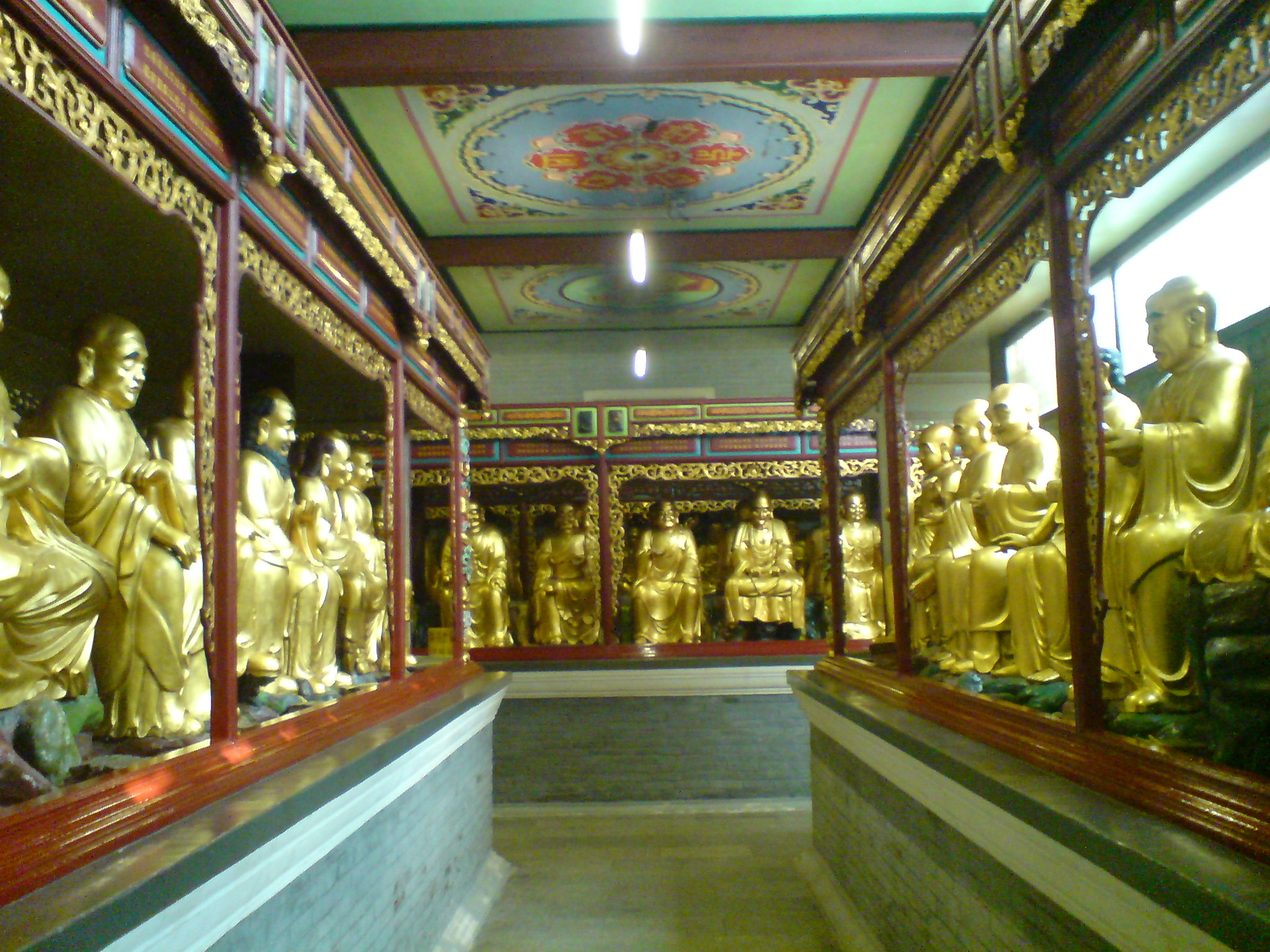
Arhats' statues in the Hall of the 500 Arhats

=== Renwei temple ===
Locate at front street of Renwei Temple, Longjin West Rd. It is in the old Bantang village, around 2,200 square kilometers area. The temple is for Zhenwu Emperor of Taoism, originally named Beidi Temple. It established in 1052 and it was the largest temple by the period. The government used to repair it in 1622, 1736 - 1795 and 1862 - 1874.

=== Five-mouthed Wells ===
Five-mouthed Wells (Chinese: 五眼井; pinyin: Wǔyǎn Jǐng; Jyutping: Ng5 Ngaan5 Zeng2), alternatively known as (Chinese: 五眼泉; pinyin: Wǔyǎn Quán; Jyutping: Ng5 Ngaan5 Cyun4), lie next to Hualin Temple.

=== Taihua Building ===
Taihua Building (Chinese: 泰華樓; pinyin: Tàihuá Loú; Jyutping: Taai3 Waa4 Lau4) is located at No.27, Duobao Fang (Chinese: 多寶坊; pinyin: Duōbǎo Fāng; Jyutping: Do1 Bou2 Fong1; lit. 'Treasure Lane'), Enning Lu. It used to be the study of Li Wentian (Chinese: 李文田), the Tanhua (Chinese: 探花; pinyin: Tànhuā; Jyutping: Taam3 Faa1; lit. 'No.3 in national civil examinations in feudal China or the 3rd place in imperial examination or No.3 scholar') during Xianfeng Emperor (Chinese: 咸豐帝) years, Qing Dynasty. The building had a collection of 100 thousand books, some of which were lost during Second Sino-Japanese War (Chinese: 抗日戰爭). Moreover, some of the calligraphy works and paintings were taken away during Cultural Revolution (Chinese: 文化大革命).

== Registered Cultural Heritage Sites ==
There are 11 Registered Cultural Heritages in Xiguan:

- Wen Tower (Chinese: 文塔)
- Liang Clan Ancestral Hall (Chinese: 梁家祠)
- Stele at Qinghao Archaic office of Wenlan Academy (Chinese: 文瀾書院清濠公所石碑)
- Stele at Permanent Senate of Senior Official Lu who initiated Yue (Guangdong) (Chinese: 開越陸大夫駐節故址碑)
- Taotaoju Tea House (Chinese: 陶陶居)
- Lianxianglou Tea House (Chinese: 蓮香樓)
- Taying Building (Chinese: 塔影樓)
- Former site of Lingnan Institute of Art & Literature (Chinese: 嶺南藝苑舊址)
- Guangzhou Restaurant (Chinese: 廣州酒家)
- Panxi Restaurant (Chinese: 泮溪酒家)
- Xiehe Hall (Chinese: 協和堂)

=== Wen Tower ===
With a height of 13 meters, the Wen Tower (Chinese: 文塔; pinyin: Wéntǎ; Jyutping: Man4 Taap8; lit. 'Pagoda of the God of Culture and Literature') stands in Pantang (Chinese: 泮塘; pinyin: Pàntáng; Jyutping: Bun6-3 Tong4-2; lit. 'Half Pond'), which used to be the flowery orchard of King Liu (Chinese: 劉王; pinyin: Liúwáng; Jyutping: Lau4 Wong4) in Southern Han (Chinese: 南漢; pinyin: Nánhàn; Jyutping: Naam4 Hon3). It was built to enshrine and worship Wenquxing sometime between Mid-Ming Period and Early Qing.

== Heritage preservation measures ==
Cultural Heritages Management Office of Liwan District (Chinese: 荔灣區文物管理所) was founded in 1998.

The Cultural Heritages Preservation Liaison System among the District, Subdistricts and residential communities (Chinese: 區、街道、社區三級文物保護聯絡制度) was founded in 2001.

Liwan Government had invested funds of totally 59.383 million RMB yuan to preserve cultural heritages by 2001.
