= Liu Yiman =

Chinese archaeologist (born 1940)

Liu Yiman (Chinese: 刘一曼; born 1940) is a Chinese archaeologist and scholar of oracle-bone inscriptions (jiǎgǔwén 甲骨文) who long worked on the excavations at the Ruins of Yin (Yinxu 殷墟) in Anyang, Henan Province. She was a researcher and a doctoral supervisor at the Institute of Archaeology, Chinese Academy of Social Sciences (CASS). Her research interests include Shang and Zhou archaeology, oracle bone inscriptions, and ancient Chinese bronze mirrors.

== Biography ==
Liu Yiman was born in June 1940 in Fogang County, Guangdong Province. She graduated from Guangdong Guangya Middle School (广东广雅中学) in Guangzhou in 1957. In 1962, she completed her undergraduate degree in Archaeology at Peking University. In the same year, she was admitted to the Institute of Archaeology, Chinese Academy of Sciences, as a graduate student, studying Shang-Zhou archaeology (商周考古) under the supervision of Xu Xusheng (Chinese: 徐旭生). After graduating in 1966, she remained at the institute as a researcher until her retirement in 2005.

In October 2018, she was awarded a "Yinxu Archaeological Excavation 'Meritorious Person'" commemorative badge and certificate at the 90th-anniversary celebration of Yinxu's scientific excavations.

== Career ==
From 1972 onwards, Liu Yiman committed much of her career to fieldwork at the Yinxu site, which was the capital of the Late Shang dynasty. She participated in excavations of structural bases, tombs, sacrificial pits, chariot‐and‐horse pits, bone‐waste pits, and oracle-bone pits.

Among her many contributions, three major archaeological discoveries stand out:

- In 1973, Liu Yiman participated in the excavation of Xiaotun South Area (小屯南地), during which more than 5,000 inscribed oracle-bones (刻辞甲骨) were recovered. In particular, Pit H24, which was excavated under Liu's lead, uncovered more than 1,300 pieces of inscribed oracle-bones, making it the largest single-unit recovery of inscribed oracle-bones in that season. This find is widely regarded as the second major oracle-bone discovery at Yinxu.
- In 1990, Liu Yiman took part in the excavation of Tomb No. 160 at Guojiazhuang (郭家庄160号墓), which is a well-preserved high-ranking noble (military leader) tomb. The tomb yielded 353 objects, including 293 bronze vessels (among them 41 fine bronze ritual vessels). The find has important significance for understanding Shang-period burial practices, the assemblage of bronze ritual vessels and their chronology. Tomb 160 was selected as one of China's "Top Ten Archaeological Discoveries" in 1990.
- In 1991, Liu Yiman both led and participated in the excavation of the H3 oracle-bone pit at Huayanzhuang East (花园庄东地). This pit yielded 1,583 bones in total, of which 689 bore inscriptions. The discovery has high value for the study of oracle-bone text chronology, "non-royal" divination records and Shang-period family structures. This pit is regarded as Yinxu's third major oracle-bone discovery.

In addition to fieldwork, Liu led significant research projects. She hosted key research projects for CASS, including two major projects: "Yinxu Huayanzhuang East Oracle‐Bones"(殷墟花园庄东地甲骨) and"Yinxu Xiaotun Village Zhongcun South Oracle‐Bones"(殷墟小屯村中村南甲骨). From 1996 to 2009, Liu was also the project-leader for the project "Periodization and Dating of Oracle Bones from Yinxu" within the Xia-Shang-Zhou Chronology Project 夏商周断代工程 (a national scientific and technological project), focusing on the chronology of the late Shang Dynasty.

== Public engagement ==
In later years, Liu has been featured in documentaries and interviews recounting her experiences at Anyang and reflecting on the significance of oracle-bone discoveries for Chinese history and archaeology. Her work has been cited in popular and academic accounts of the Yinxu excavations and the development of oracle-bone studies in China.

== Bibliography ==
=== Selection of books ===
- IA CASS (1980) Xiaotun nan di jia gu 小屯南地甲骨. Zhonghua Shuju 中华书局. [co-author]
- Kong Xiangxing 孔祥星 & Liu Yiman 刘一曼 (1984) Zhongguo gudai tongjing 中国古代铜镜. Wenwu Chubanshe 文物出版社. [co-author]
- IA CASS (1994) Yinxu de Faxian yu Yanjiu 殷墟的发现与研究. Kexue Chubanshe 科学出版社. (reprinted 2001; published as part of Chinese Academy of Social Sciences volume in 2007). [co-author]
- IA CASS (1998) Anyang Yinxu Guojiazhuang Shangdai Muzang: 1982 – 1992 安阳殷墟郭家庄商代墓葬: 1982年 – 1992 年考古发掘报告. Zhongguo da baike quanshu Chubanshe 中囯大百科全书出版社. [co-author]
- IA CASS (2003) Yinxu Huayuanzhuang dong di jiagu 殷墟花园庄东地甲骨. Yunnan renmin chubanshe 云南人民出版社, 2003. [co-author]
- Liu Yiman 刘一曼, Wen Mingrong 温明荣, Cao Dingyun 曹定云, Guo Zhenlu 郭振禄 (2010) Jiagu xue lunwen ji 甲骨学论文集. Zhonghua Shuju 中华书局. [co-author]

=== Selection of articles ===
- Liu Yiman 刘一曼 (1985) 'Shi lun Zhanguo tongjing de fenqu 试论战国铜镜的分区', Kaogu 考古, (11), pp. 1008–1014.
- Liu Yiman 刘一曼 (1991) 'Shi lun Yinxu jiagu shuci试论殷墟甲骨书辞', Kaogu 考古, (6), pp. 546–554.
- Liu Yiman 刘一曼 (1998) 'Yinxu Guojiazhuang 160 hao mu de faxian ji zhuyao shouhuo 殷墟郭家庄160号墓的发现及主要收获', Kaogu 考古, (9), pp. 64–74.
- Liu Yiman 刘一曼 (2002) 'Lun Anyang Yinxu muzang qingtong wuqi de zuhe 论安阳殷墟墓葬青铜武器的组合', Kaogu 考古, (3), pp. 63–75.
