= Xu Shilin =

Xu Shilin may refer to:

- Xu Shilin (tennis) (born 1998), Chinese tennis player
- Xu Shilin (character), fictional character in The Legend of the White Snake
