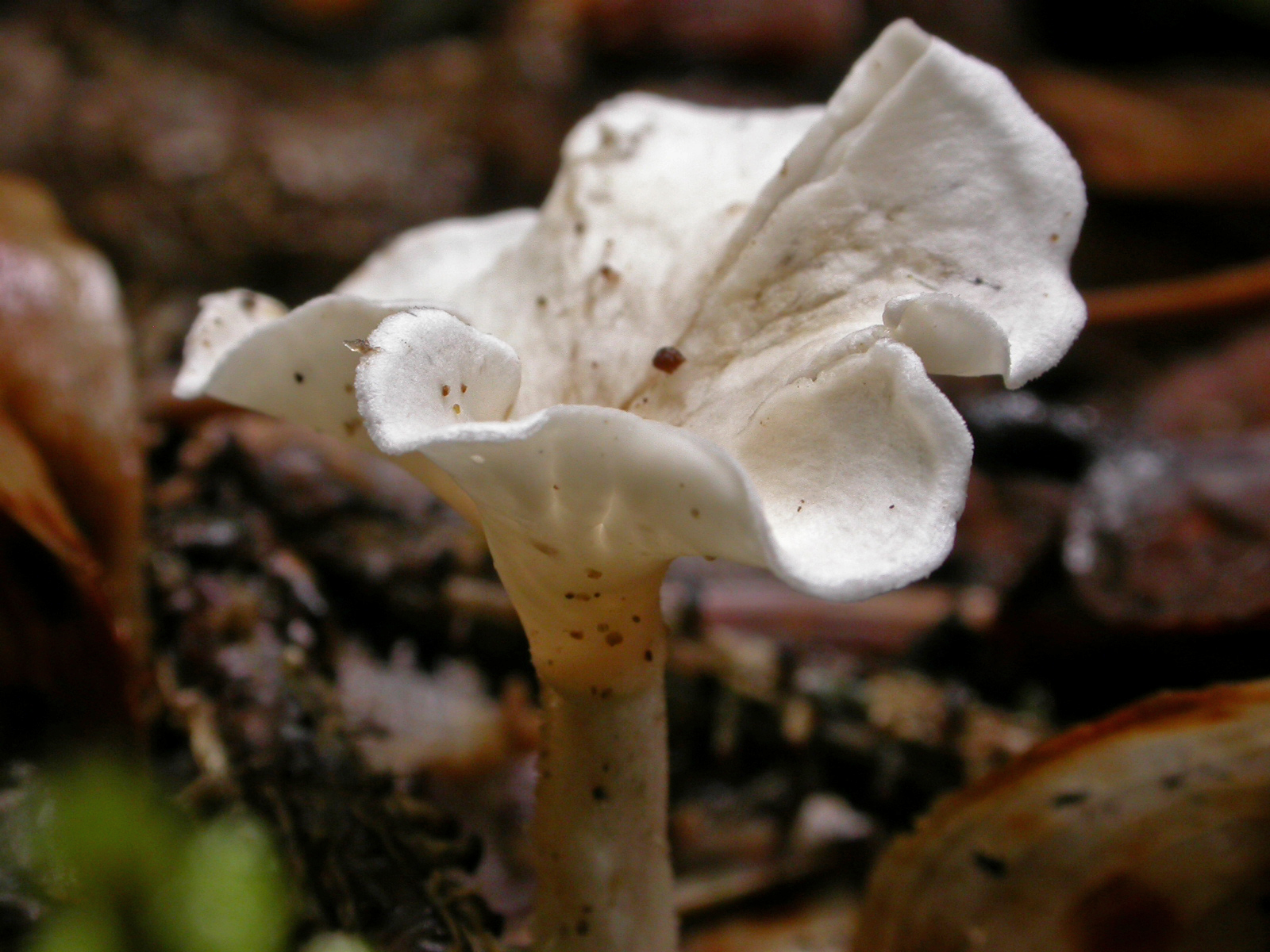

Conservation status
- Near Threatened (IUCN 3.1)

Scientific classification
- Kingdom: Fungi
- Division: Basidiomycota
- Class: Agaricomycetes
- Order: Agaricales
- Suborder: Baisuzheniineae; H. Qu, Z.W. Ge, Zhu L. Yang & Redhead (2025)
- Family: Baisuzheniaceae; H. Qu, Z.W. Ge, Zhu L. Yang & Redhead (2025)
- Genus: Baisuzhenia; H. Qu, Z.W. Ge, Zhu L. Yang & Redhead (2025)
- Species: B. humphreyi

Binomial name
- Baisuzhenia humphreyi H. Qu, Z.W. Ge, Zhu L. Yang & Redhead (2025)

Synonyms
- (Species): Craterellus humphreyi Burt (1914); Stereopsis humphreyi (Burt) Redhead & D.A. Reid

= Baisuzhenia =

Baisuzhenia humphreyi

Genus of fungi

Baisuzhenia is a genus of fungi in the order Agaricales. It is the only genus in the suborder Baisuzheniineae and the family Baisuzheniaceae. It is monotypic, being represented by the single species Baisuzhenia humphreyi, also known as ghost funnel, and formerly classified as Stereopsis humphreyi.

== Description ==
Baisuzhenia humphreyi produces white, fleshy, fan-shaped fruitbodies on long stipes, and smooth to only slightly wrinkled spore-bearing hymenium. Fruitbody initials begin as erect stipes that form a pileus off on one side, that fan out as it matures and may eventually expand upward and curl to become funnel-like but with a slit down one side where attached to the stipe. The tissues are unremarkable, and the spores are hyaline (colorless), white in spore deposits, thin-walled, smooth and not amyloid.

== Distribution and habitat ==
Baisuzhenia humphreyi is found on the coastal Sitka spruce fog zone in western North America (British Columbia, Canada and the Pacific Northwest, United States), and high altitude coniferous forests in Asia (China, Bhutan) It has been listed as a possibly threatened species in Canada.

The fungus appears to be saprophytic.

== Etymology ==
The suborder, family, and genus names alludes to Bai Suzhen, the legendary Chinese Madam White Snake, because of the white, snake-like fruitbodies initials that then become hooded like a cobra and finally transform into a fan shape. The species epithet was named after Clarence John Humphrey, an American forest pathologist who discovered the fungus in 1909 along the coast of Washington, USA.

== See also ==
- List of Agaricales genera
- List of Agaricales families
