= White Snake Temple =

Chinese folk temple

- 白蛇廟
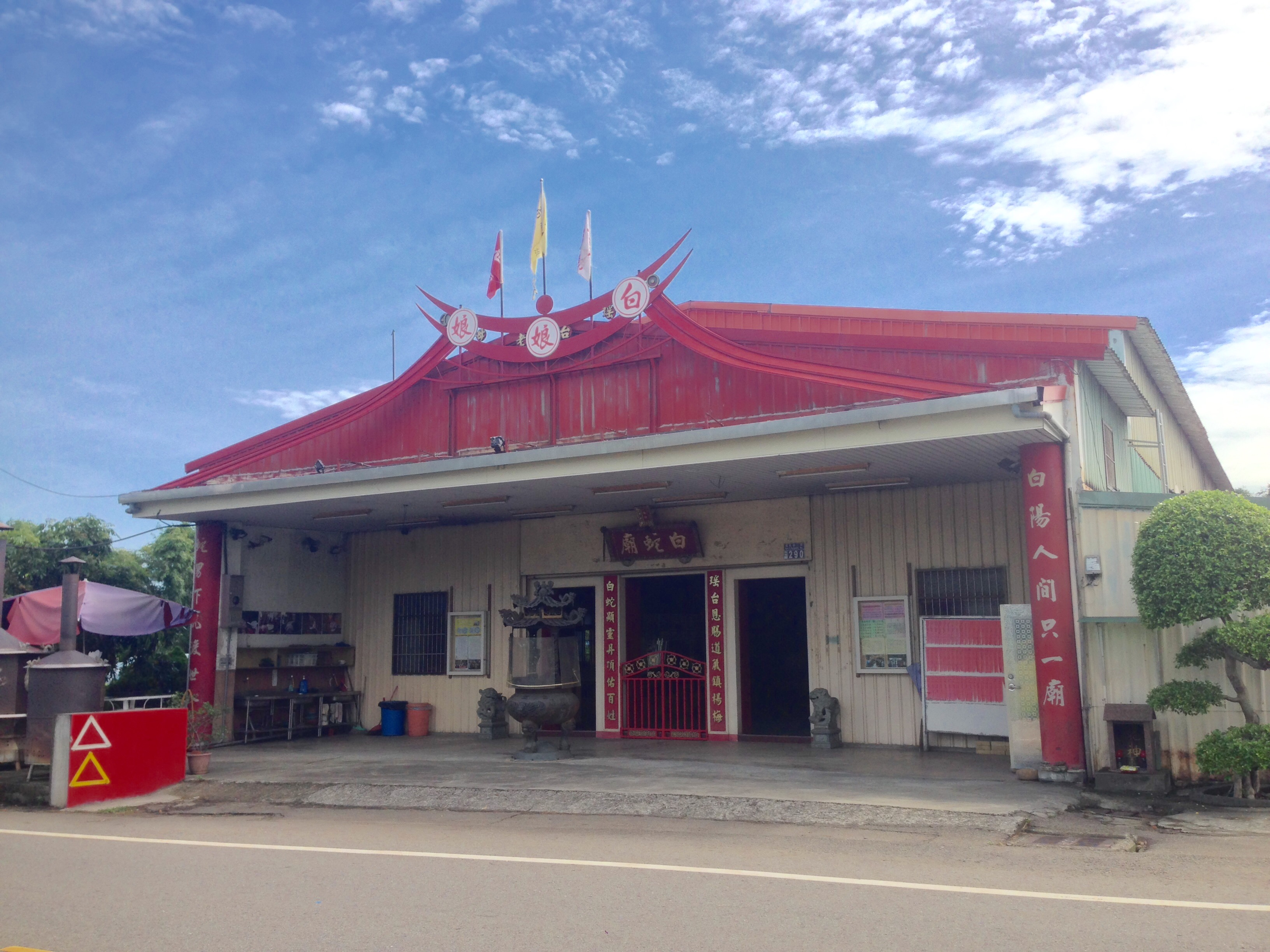

Religion
- Affiliation: Chinese folk religion, Taoism
- Deity: Bai Suzhen (白素貞)

Location
- Location: Fangliao, Pingtung County, Taiwan
- Interactive map of White Snake Temple

Architecture
- Founder: Luo Qinshi
- Established: 2002

The White Snake Temple (Chinese: 白蛇廟) is a Chinese folk temple in Yangmei District, Taoyuan, Taiwan. It is dedicated to Bai Suzhen, also known as the White Snake Lady (白娘娘), a character from the Chinese legend Legend of the White Snake. The temple was founded by Luo Qinshi (羅欽師) in 2002. It is also known for keeping hundreds of live white snakes, which worshippers believe are messengers of Bai Suzhen. Visitors can have the snakes placed around their shoulders as part of a blessing ritual.

== History ==
The White Snake Temple was founded by Luo Qinshi (羅欽師), who worked in the storage and logistics business. Luo returned to Taiwan from Malaysia in 1990. In 1992, a friend left a female white snake in his care. The friend never returned for it, so Luo kept the snake. He believed that it brought good luck to his family and helped his business. About two years later, another friend brought him a male white snake from Jiaxian, Kaohsiung. The two snakes later produced offspring.

According to local tradition, Luo learned through a dream that the white snake was an incarnation of Bai Suzhen, the main character in the Legend of the White Snake. Some religious figures also told him that the snake was a form of the goddess. Luo then decided to build a temple for her. He worked with his friend Liu Donglong (劉東隆) to establish the temple in Yangmei. They used the former building of an electronics factory for the temple.

The temple was founded in May 2002. A ceremony to install its deity statues was held in June that year. Many people came to the ceremony, causing a traffic jam of nearly two kilometres.

== Deities ==
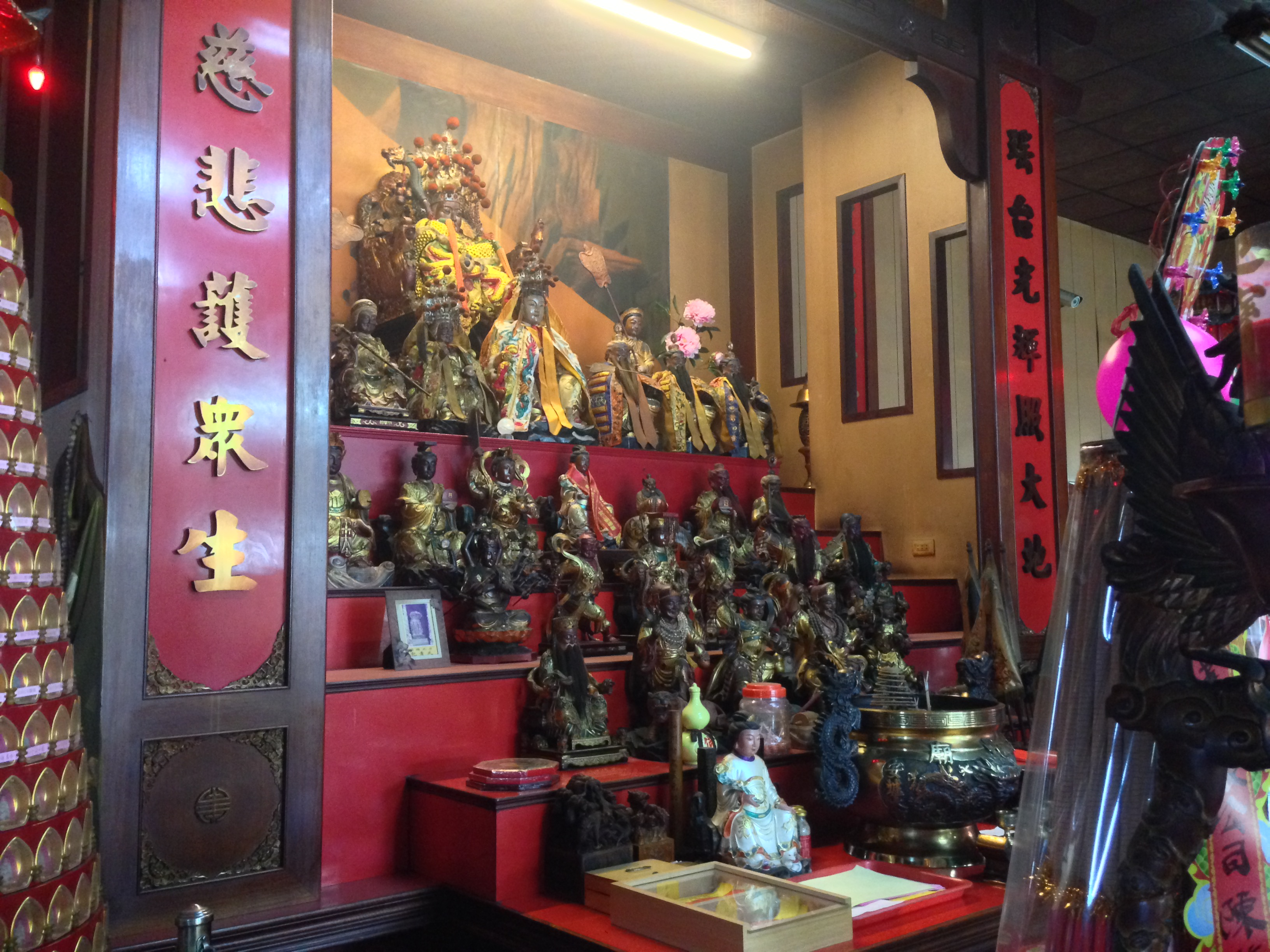
Shrine of Bai Suzhen at the White Snake Temple.

The temple worships Bai Suzhen, also known as the White Snake Lady (白娘娘), as its main deity. People visit the temple to pray for wealth, good health, and marriage.

The temple also worships Yaotai Laomu (瑤台老母), whose statue stands above Bai Suzhen's in the main shrine. Other deities include Guanyin, Guan Yu, the Three Pure Ones, Mazu, Zhang Tianshi (張天師), Lishan Laomu (梨山老母), Dimo (地母), and Jiutian Xuannü.

The temple also welcomes visitors who bring green snakes. In the legend of the White Snake, the green snake is Bai Suzhen's companion, Xiaoqing.

== Worship and rituals ==
The White Snake Temple in Yangmei, Taoyuan, keeps live white snakes. The temple calls them "Little White Dragon Messengers" (小白龍使者) of Bai Suzhen, also known as the White Snake Lady. In January 2025, the temple had about 300 snakes.

Visitors can ask temple staff to place a white snake over their shoulders. They believe this brings good luck and protects them from misfortune. The snakes are treated as messengers of the White Snake Lady.

The temple celebrates the White Snake Lady's birthday on the Dragon Boat Festival, the fifth day of the fifth lunar month. Worshippers take part in prayers and other activities. Egg-balancing is also held during the festival.

The temple also gives worshippers items believed to bring good fortune. These include "dragon robes" (龍衣), the skins shed by the white snakes, and "treasure basins" (聚寶盆). Worshippers may offer incense, flowers, fruit, sweets, and eggs. Many visit to pray for wealth, while others seek blessings for love and marriage.
