= Wenquxing =

Chinese god of literature

In Chinese mythology, Wenquxing (文曲星, 'Star of Literature') is a god responsible for overseeing literary pursuits and examinations. Those who excel in literary skills and hold high-ranking positions in the imperial court are often associated with the incarnation of Wenquxing to the mortal realm. Unlike other literary deities such as Wenchang Wang and Kui Xing, Wenquxing emphasizes romantic literary talents, while Wenchang Wang focuses on achieving fame and fortune, and Kui Xing specializes in literary composition and examinations. He is mostly worshipped by students wishing for success or to enter a better school or position.

== Folk beliefs ==
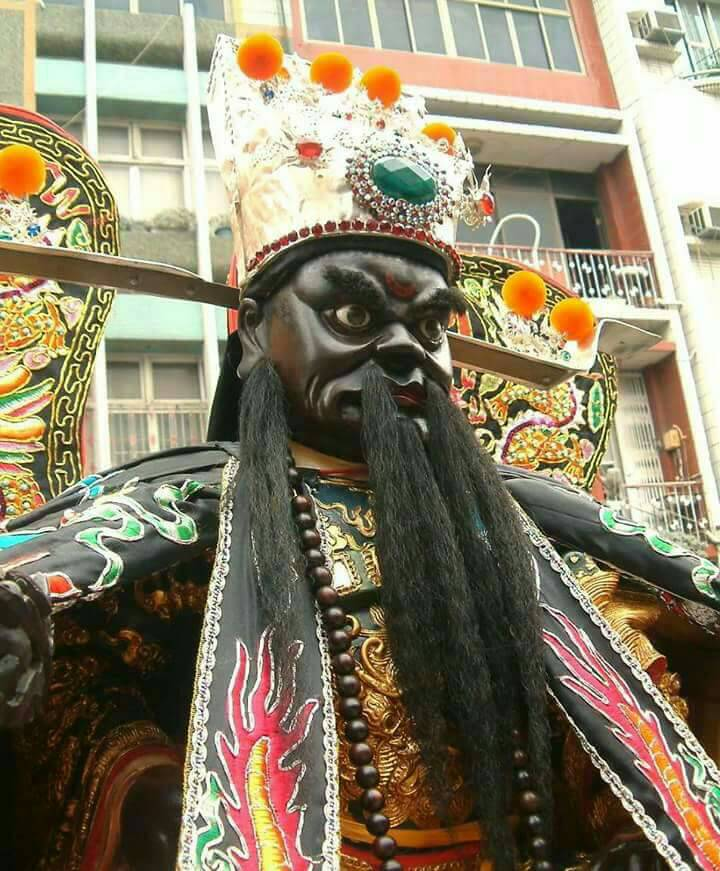
Bao Zheng, who is said to be the reincarnation of Wenquxing

In folk beliefs, it is believed that various figures, such as Bi Gan, the prince of Shang, Yi Yin, the prime minister of the Shang dynasty, Zhang Dongzhi, the prime minister of the Tang dynasty, Fan Zhongyan, the prime minister of the Song dynasty, Bao Zheng, the magistrate of Kaifeng, Wen Tianxiang, the Grand Chancellor of the Song dynasty, and Xu Shilin, the son of Xu Xian, the male protagonist of the Legend of White Snake, are all considered incarnations of Wenquxing.

In Li Chunfeng's Cangtou Shi (Hidden Head Poems), there is a passage that states, "With Wenquxing descending to the mortal realm, born in a tofu seller's family, later becoming a prime minister, capable of ensuring peace" (referring to the Zhang Jianzhi-led coup).

In Zheng Guangzu's work Licheng Tang Yi Yin Gengshen Xiezi, it is stated: "Under the decree of the Shangdi, Wenquxing was sent to descend into the mortal realm, where he was reborn in Yishui. Later, Yi Yuanwai took him in, raised him to adulthood, and named him Yi Yin. He assisted King Chengtang and established the capital at Boyi. This immortal child is the one we summon as Wenquxing".

In Fengshen Yanyi, Jiang Ziya posthumously granted Bi Gan the title of 'Wenquxing' in the end.

In Shi Nai'an's great work Water Margin, it is stated: "Indeed, the Jade Emperor dispatched two celestial stars from the Ziwei Palace to assist the emperor (Son of Heaven) of this mortal realm: Wenquxing is none other than the Grand Secretariat of the Dragon Pavilion and Chief Magistrate of Kaifeng Prefecture, Bao Zheng, while Wuquxing is the Grand Marshal of the Western Xia Kingdom, Di Qing. These two virtuous ministers came forth to aid the emperor of this dynasty."

Some people believe that Wenquxing and Kuixing are the same star, while others believe they are distinct. In folklore, there is often confusion between Wenquxing and Wenchangxing. Wenchangxing is also identified with Zitong, a local god of Sichuan who is depicted as dressing up as a scholar, while Kuixing is depicted by a ghostly face. As the civil service examinations gained increasing significance and assessments at Qing-period academies became highly valued, the importance of the Wenchang cult naturally grew. Additionally, Kuixing was highly worshipped at Taiwanese academies, and the combination of both cults led to the veneration of what is known as the Five Wenchang. The exact origins of the Five Wenchang rites at academies in Taiwan remain unknown. The Fengshan xianzhi (Gazetteer of Fengshan County), published in 1720, includes a section titled Five Wenchang, which states:

The Immortals Hall (Xiantang) is in the Ashe in front of Changzhi Village. He Kan, a local, gathered people together and builtit. They enshrined the Five Wenchang and performed spirit writing (fuji). A bamboo grove and flowering and fruiting trees were planted around it, and it was a most lovely sight. Later, a thatched cottage was built, and it served as a resting place for travelers. In recent years, King Father of the East (Dong Wanggong) and Queen Mother of the West (Xi Wangmu) have been enshrined together there.

— Fengshan xianzhi

== Astronomy ==
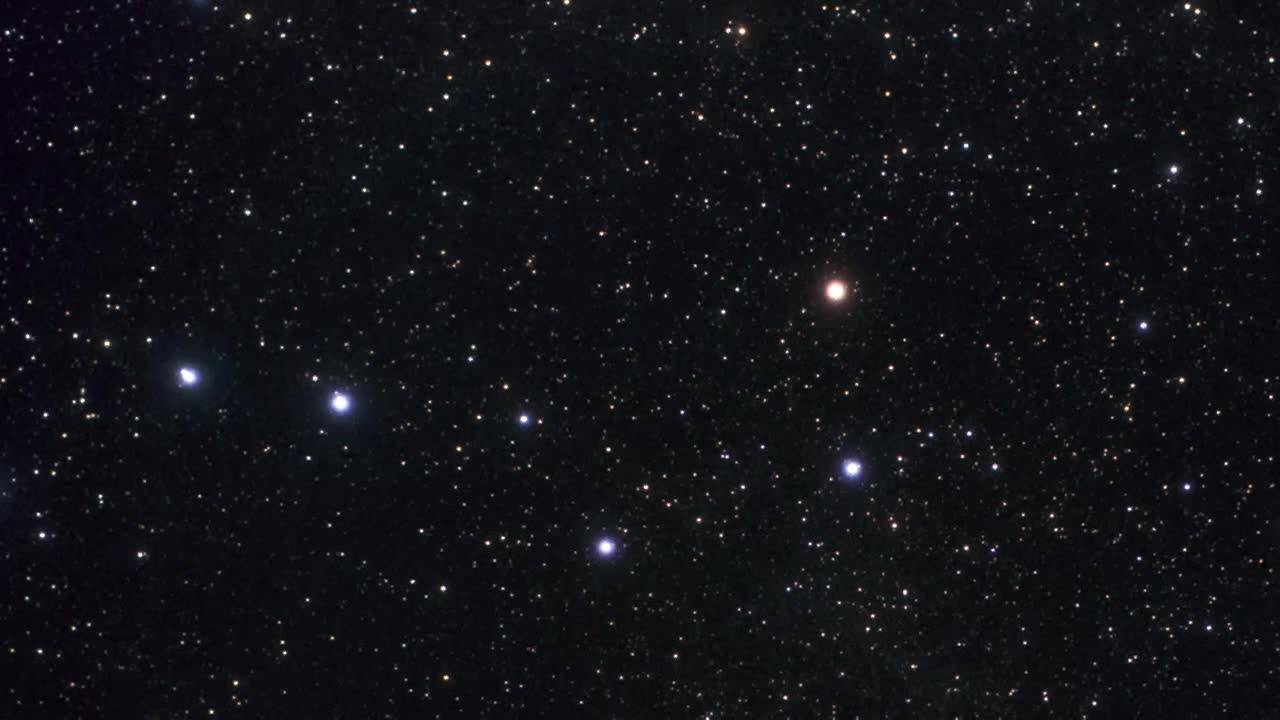
The Big Dipper with Delta Ursae Majoris

In astronomy, 'Wenqu' is the ancient name for the fourth star 'Tianquan' in the Northern Big Dipper (English name: Megrez δ, the 69th star of Ursa Major). 'Kuixing' refers to the description in the 'Spring and Autumn Transport Pivot', where the 'first to fourth stars in the Big Dipper are referred to as Kuixing.
