= Bai Suzhen =

Character in Chinese mythology

- Legend of the White Snake character
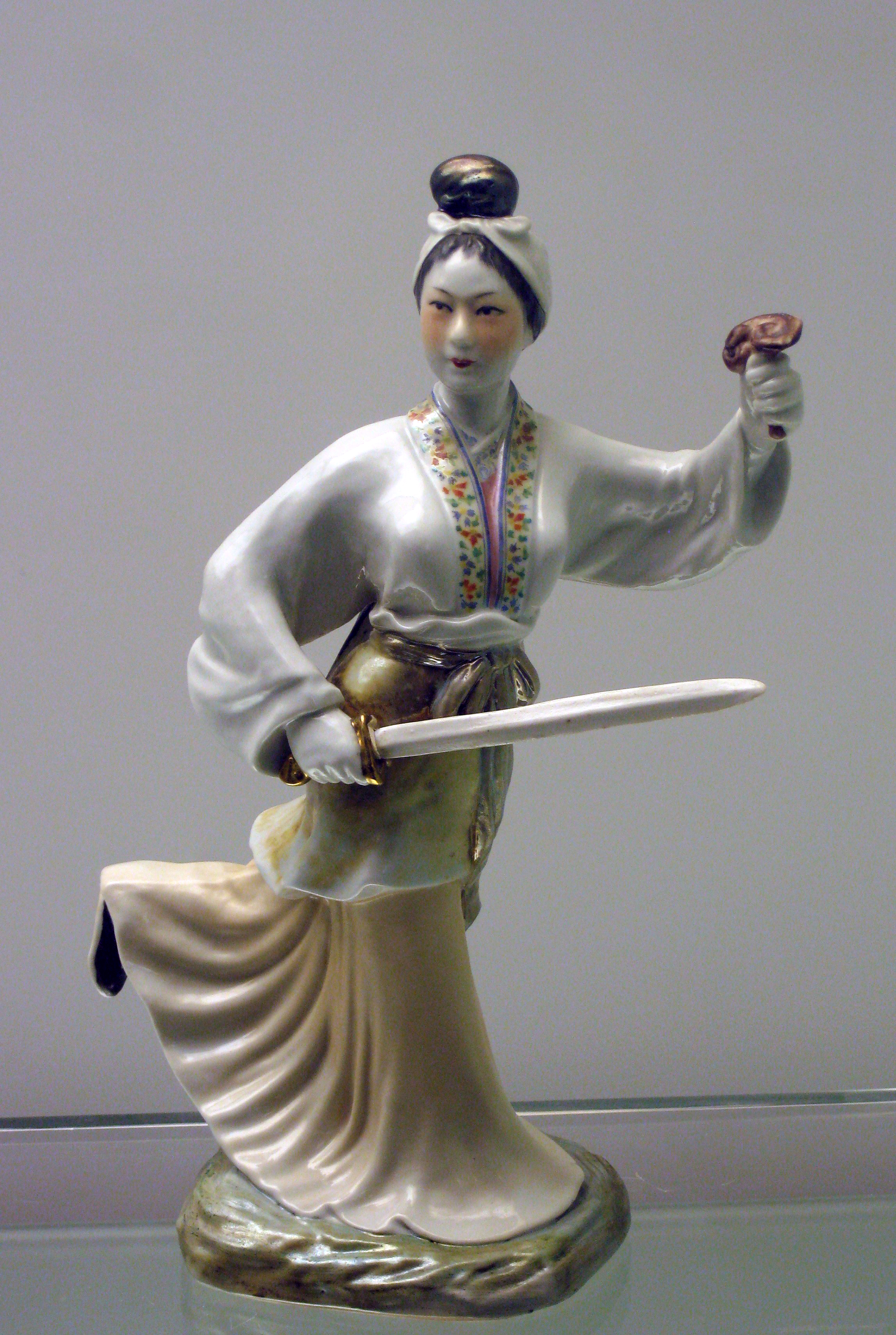
- A Jingdezhen porcelain statue of Bai Suzhen, Hong Kong Museum of Art

In-universe information
- Alias: White Snake
- Nicknames: Lady Bai, Lady White
- Species: Snake
- Gender: Female
- Family: Xiaoqing (sworn sister)
- Spouse: Xu Xian
- Children: Xu Shilin (son)
- Religion: Taoism
- Home: Mount Emei

Bai Suzhen
- Traditional Chinese: 白素貞
- Simplified Chinese: 白素贞
Transcriptions
Standard Mandarin
- Hanyu Pinyin: Bái Sùzhēn
- Wade–Giles: Pai^{2} Su^{4}-chên^{1}
Yue: Cantonese
- Yale Romanization: Baahk Sou-jīng
- Jyutping: Baak^{6} Sou^{3}-zing^{1}

Lady Bai
- Chinese: 白娘子
Transcriptions
Standard Mandarin
- Hanyu Pinyin: Bái Niángzǐ
- Wade–Giles: Pai^{2} Niang^{2}-tzŭ^{3}
Yue: Cantonese
- Yale Romanization: Baahk Nèuhngjí
- Jyutping: Baak^{6} Noeng^{4}zi^{2}

Madam White Snake
- Chinese: 白蛇娘娘
Transcriptions
Standard Mandarin
- Hanyu Pinyin: Bái Shé Niángniáng
- Wade–Giles: Pai^{2} Shê^{2} Niang^{2}-niang^{2}
Yue: Cantonese
- Yale Romanization: Baahk Sèh Nèuhngnèuhng
- Jyutping: Baak^{6} Se^{4} Noeng^{4}noeng^{4}

Bai Suzhen (Chinese: 白素貞), also known as Lady Bai (白娘子; 'Lady White'), is a one-thousand-year-old white snake spirit and the title character of the Legend of the White Snake, one of China's "four great folktales". The legend has been adapted into several Chinese operas, films, television series and other media. In some versions of the legend, Bai Suzhen becomes a goddess; her worshippers refer to her as Madam White Snake (白蛇娘娘).

Bai Suzhen is regarded as a symbol of true love and good-heartedness by the Chinese people.

== Depiction ==
Bai Suzhen is often depicted as a white snake with the ability to transform into a beautiful young woman. During earlier depictions of this script – the Tang tale “Li Huang” and the Song “huaben” version Bai Suzhen was shown as a she-demon who was a malevolent seductress. She was seen as a seductress who would hunt down male partners.

In the Ming and Qing version, Bai Suzhen depiction was changed to have a morally good depiction, showing more of a caring side. To which Bai Suzhen’s story became a tale of love.

== Legend ==
After one thousand years of disciplined training in Taoism on Mount Emei, the white snake, Bai Suzhen, is transformed into a woman by the essence of the Dragon King of the East China Sea. Despite her inhuman origin, Bai is kindhearted and refuses to abuse her powers for evil, and decides to go out into the human realm and do good deeds to earn her immortality. She is later accepted by the goddess Lishan Laomu as a disciple. While traveling in the human realm, Bai Suzhen comes across a green snake who is being threatened by a beggar. Pitying the green snake, she transforms into a human and rescues the green snake. In gratitude, the green snake pledged to remain by the white snake's side forever and becomes her sworn sister. Bai Suzhen often calls her Xiaoqing (小青) or Qingmei (Chinese: 青妹; pinyin: Qīng mèi; lit. '[Younger] Sister Green').

On a visit to West Lake, she falls in love with a young man named Xu Xian and soon becomes his wife. In an alternative version of the story, Bai Suzhen takes on a beautiful woman form to search for Xu Xian, who had saved her life in a past life. She feels indebted to him and wants to repay the favor by helping him in his life. Eventually, however, a Buddhist monk, Abbot Fahai, discovers her true origin and tells Xu Xian that Bai Suzhen is a snake spirit, but Xu Xian is not convinced. After receiving advice from Fahai, Xu Xian convinced Bai Suzhen to drink realgar wine during the Dragon Boat Festival. This caused Bai Suzhen to reveal her true form as a snake, but the sight frightened Xu Xian so much that he died of shock. Distraught and desperate to bring her husband back to life, Bai Suzhen went to Heaven to steal the immortal herb Lingzhi. She succeeded in her mission and used the herb to revive Xu Xian. She continues to compel her to fight for both her marriage and her freedom. Bai Suzhen and Xiaoqing fought against Fahai and flooded the temple with water, hurting other living creatures. At last he tracks down the couple, defeats Bai Suzhen and imprisons her in the imposing Leifeng Pagoda. During her imprisonment, Bai Suzhen gives birth to a son named Xu Shilin. Later, Bai Suzhen's son grew up to be a successful scholar and went to the pagoda to pay respects to his mother, rescuing her and ascending to Heaven.

In one version of the story, Bai Suzhen is transformed into the mount of the goddess Yaotai Laomu after her imprisonment. She continues to accompany Yaotai Laomu for many years as they work to assist all living beings and save the world.

== Worship ==
Bai Suzhen is worshipped as a deity in Chinese folk religion, where she is known as Madam White Snake. It is said that she and Xu Xian once practiced Chinese medicine and that believers came to them seeking healing and health advice.

In Taoyuan City, Yangmei District, Taiwan, the White Snake Temple was built in 1991 and dedicated to her. The temple inaugurated the annual Dragon Boat Festival to celebrate the birthday of Madam White Snake, and it has become a traditional and popular event.

Located in Jizhou, Tianjin, China the White Snake Cave is where the statues of Bai Suzhen and Xiaoqing stand as deities. Legend has it that the White Snake practiced Taoism within this cave.

== Influence ==
- Suzhen's krait, a species of krait that was first identified in 2021, was named after Bai Suzhen in honor of her courage in pursuing true love and her kindness towards people.
- Baisuzhenia, a genus of mushrooms found in China, Bhutan and North America, named in 2025 after Bai Suzhen because of its white snake-like form that becomes beautiful and fan-like
- Ganoderma baisuzhenii, a species of mushroom described in 2025 from southern China related to another Chinese Ganoderma, Lingzhi (mushroom), which in legend Bai Suzhen sought as a cure to save her husband. Lingzhi is held in her hand in the porcelain figure shown above.

== Gallery ==
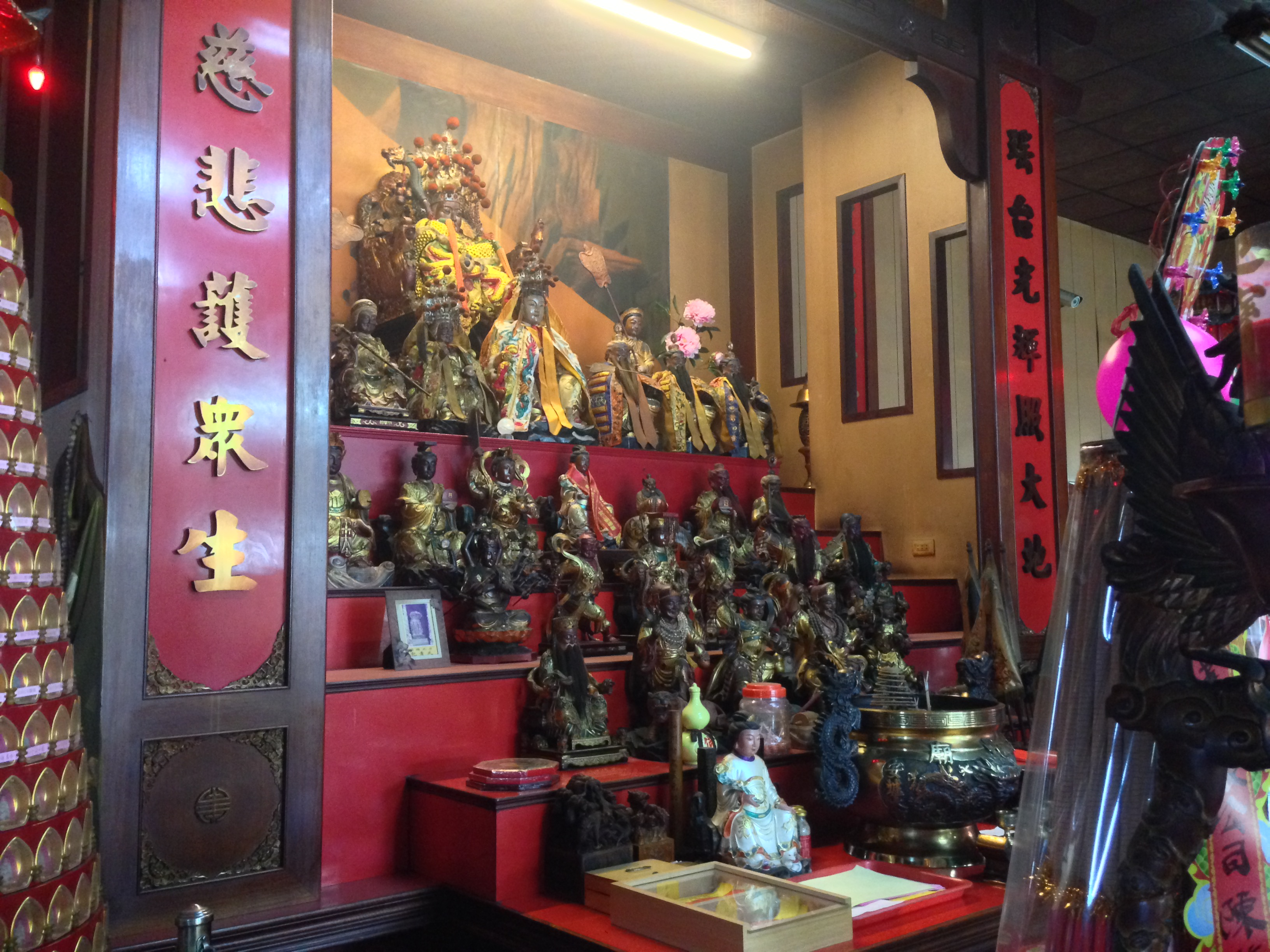
Figurines, including one of Bai Suzhen, in the White Snake Temple in Taiwan

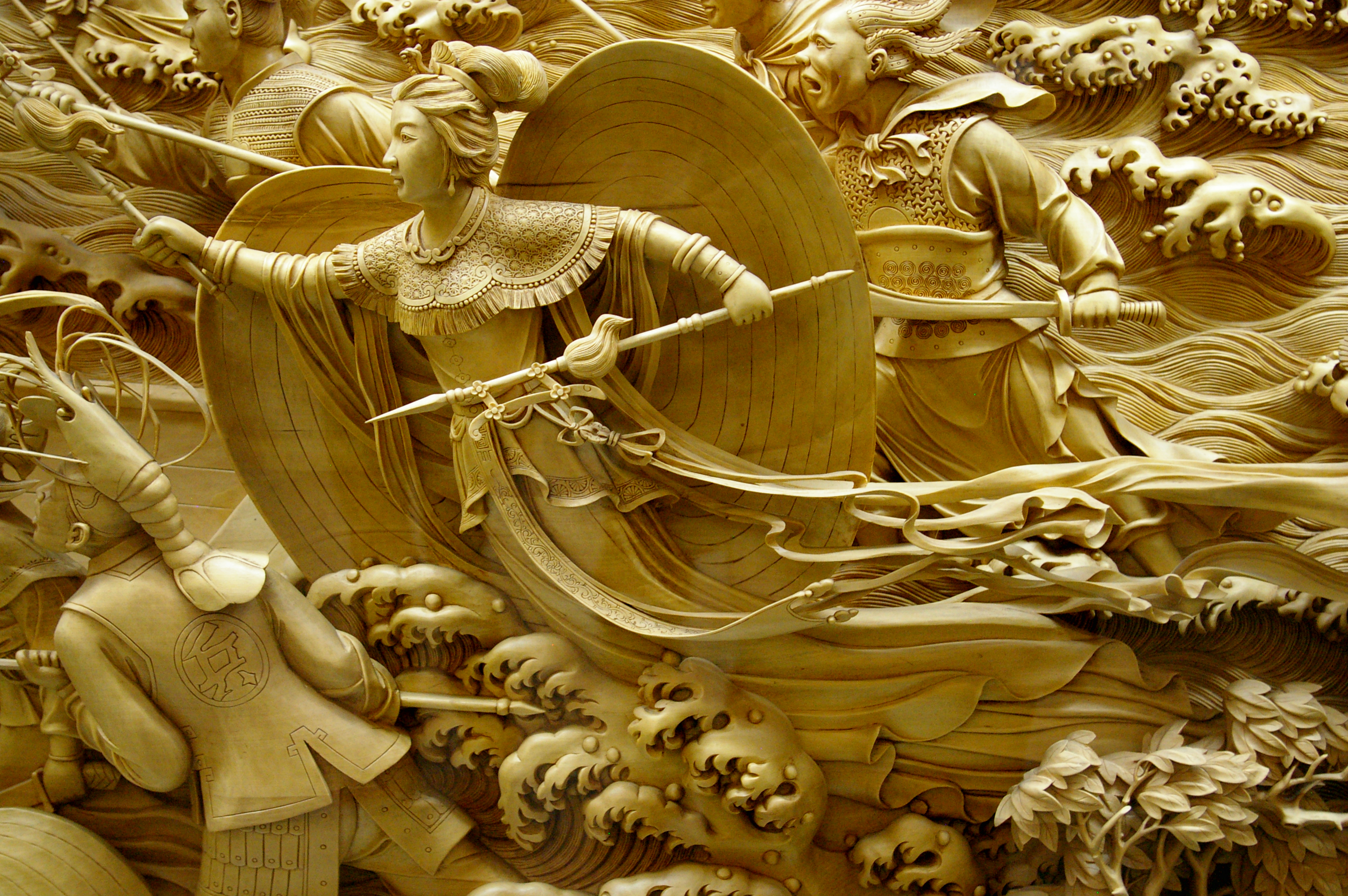
A wood relief decoration in the Leifeng Tower, Hangzhou, China

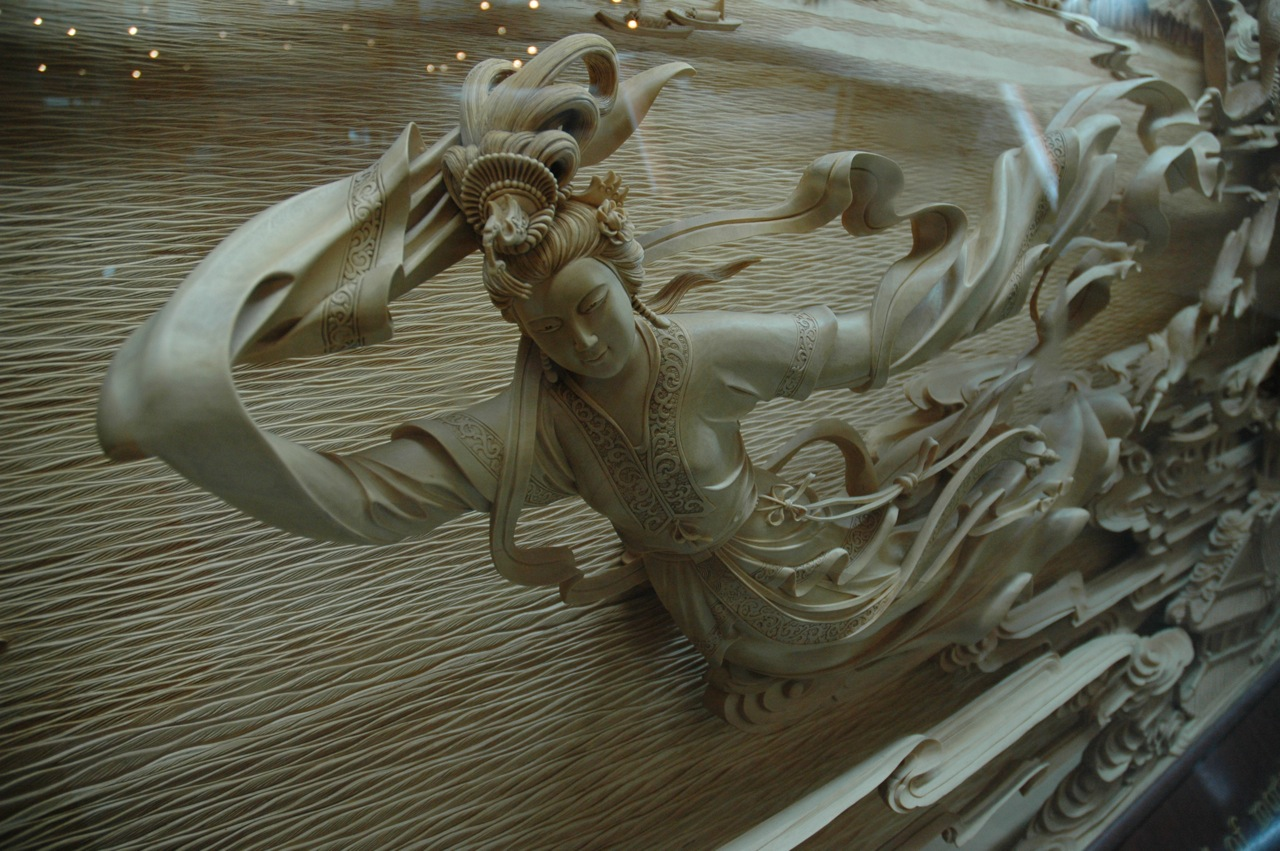
Hand-carved 3D wood reliefs depicting the story of Bai Suzhen

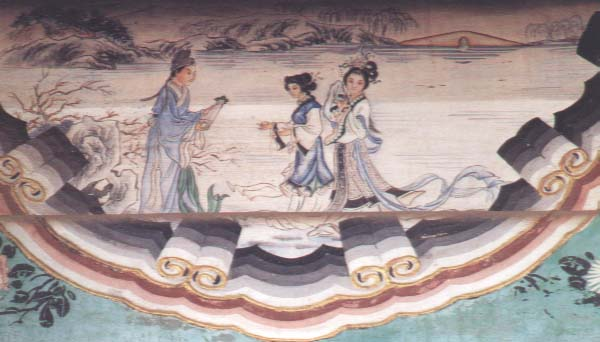
Image from the Summer Palace, Beijing, China, depicting the legend

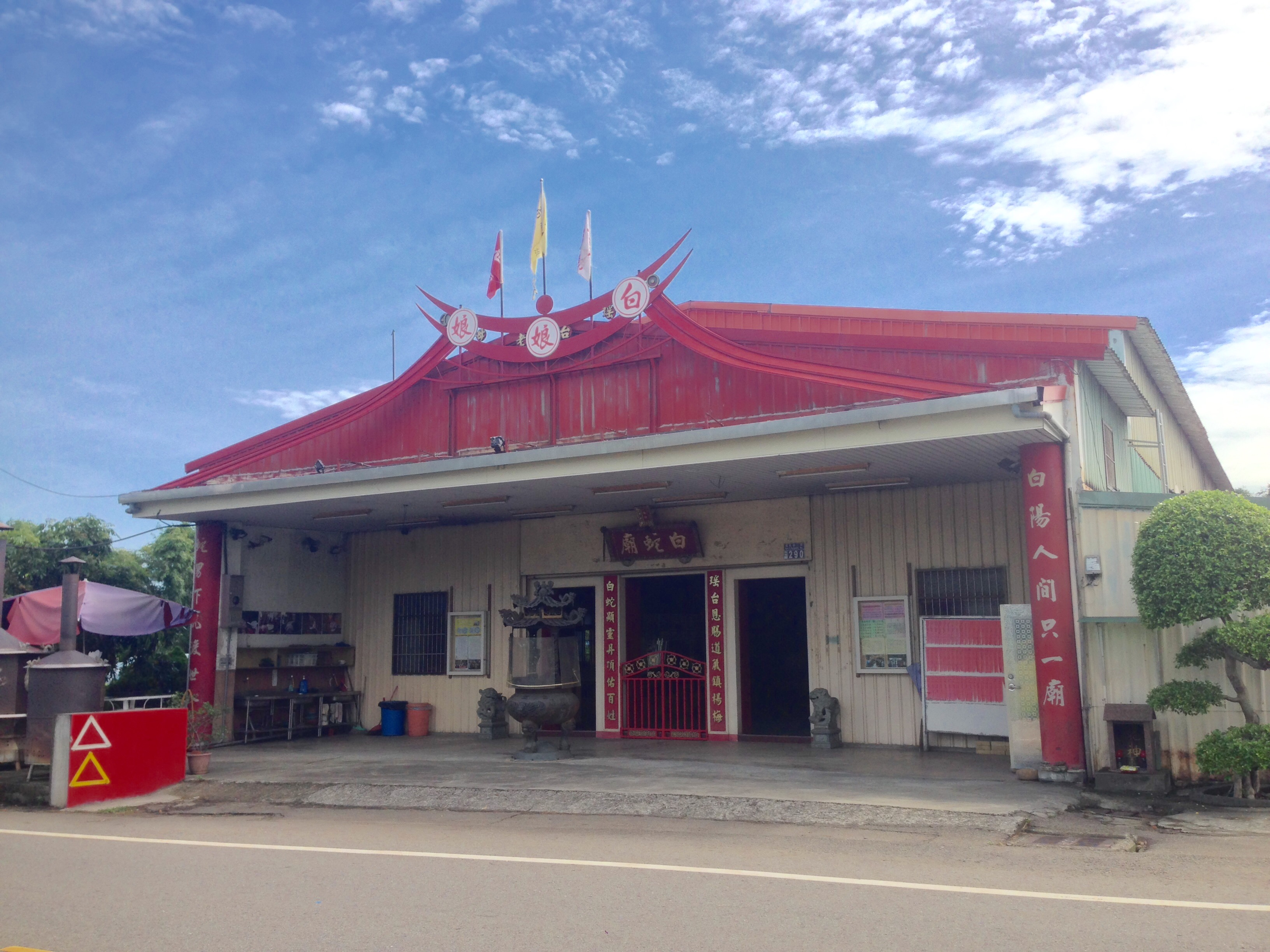
White Snake Temple in Taiwan

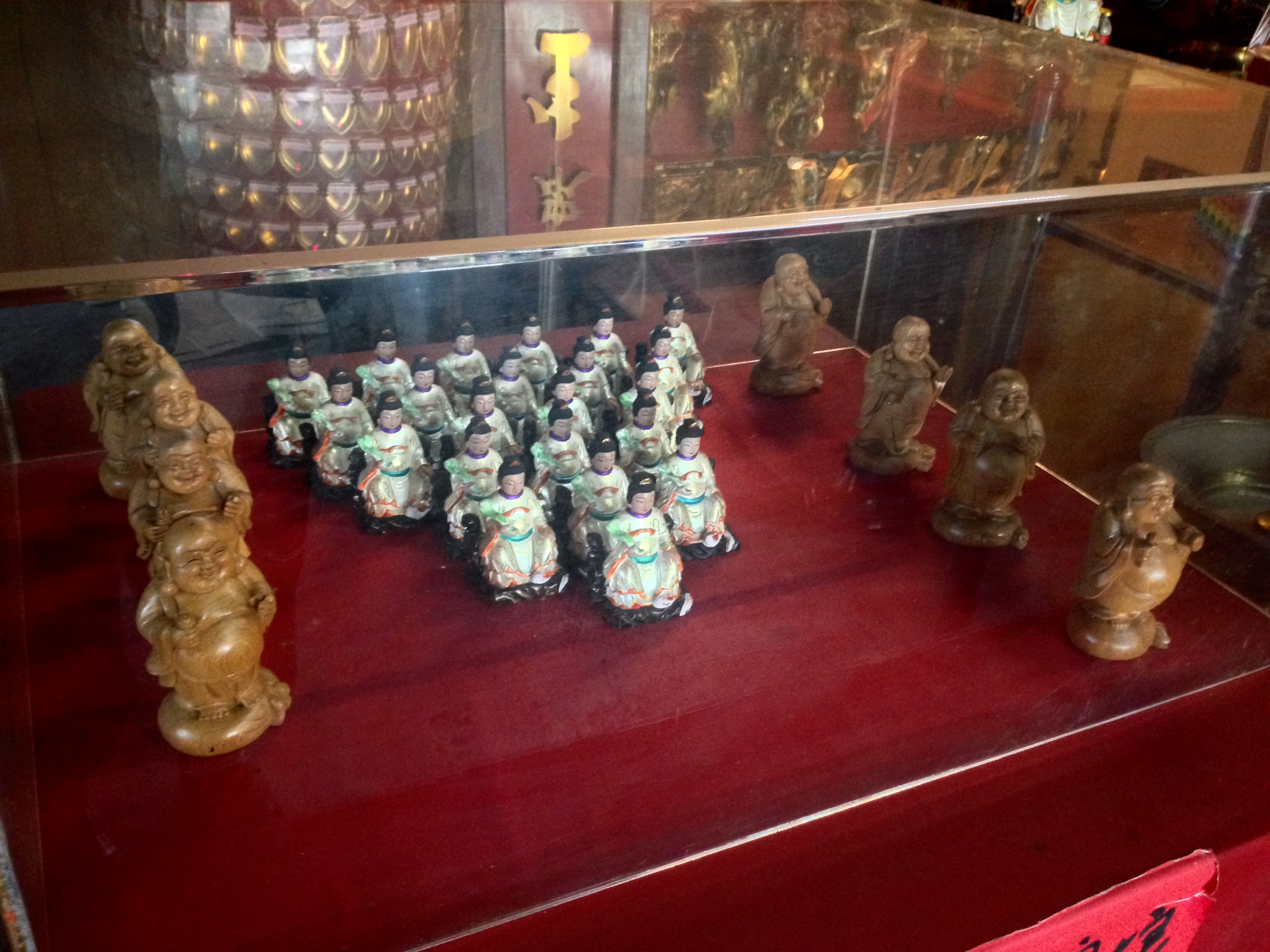
Statutes in the White Snake Temple

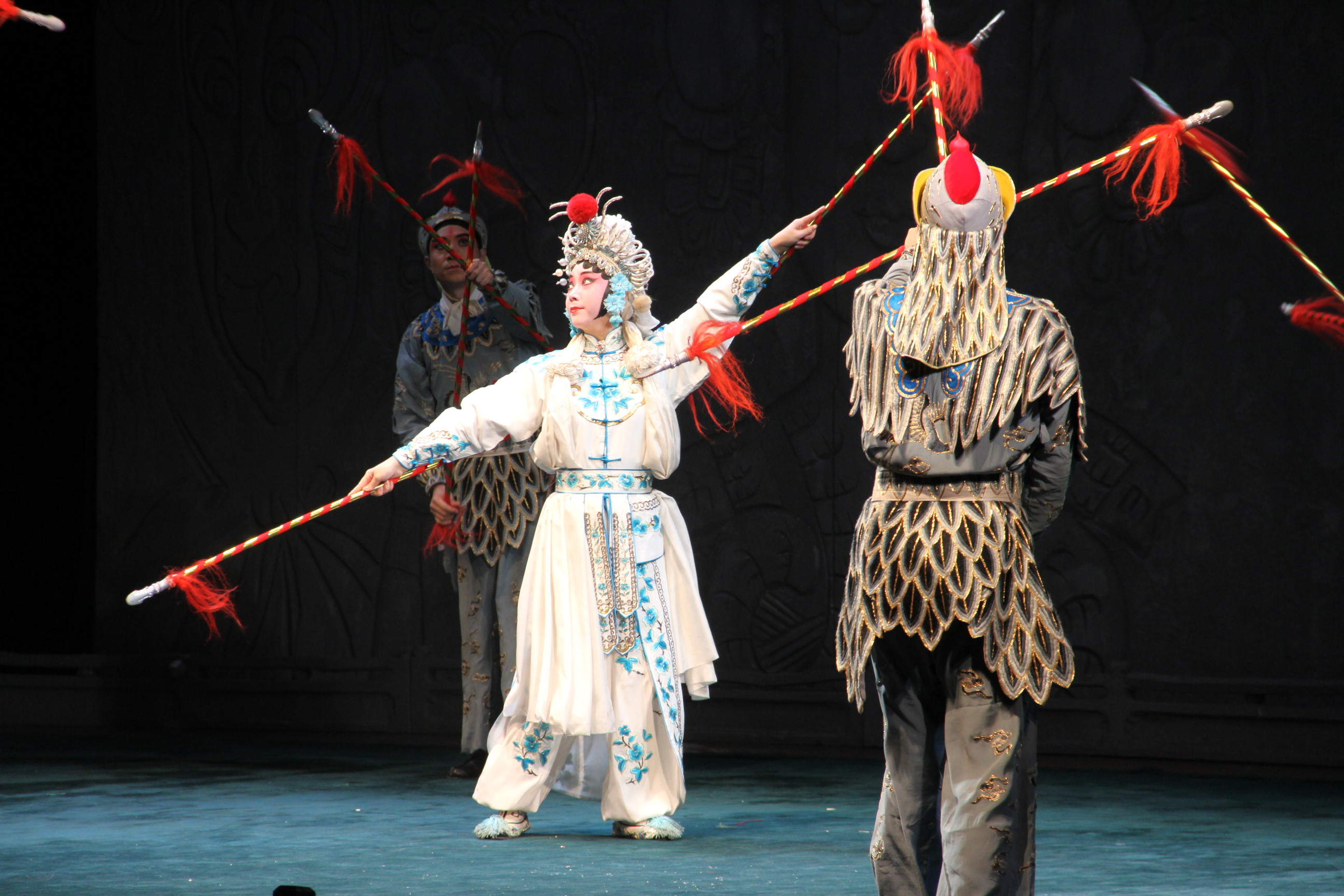
Bai Suzhen in an opera portraying the legend

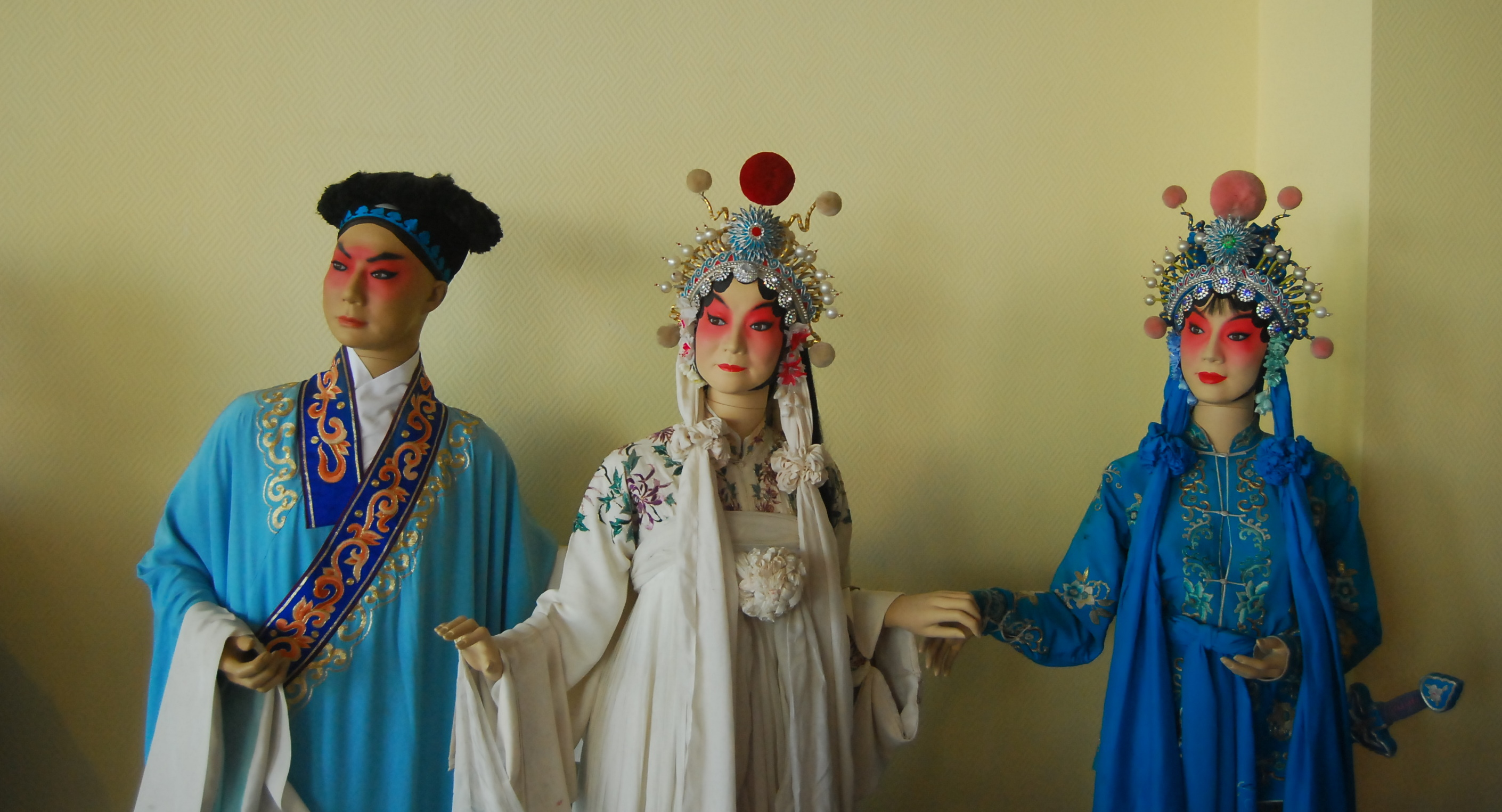
Statutes of the three protagonists in the Peking Opera.
