= Guangdong Guangya High School =

High school in Guangzhou, China

- 广东广雅中学

Location
- 1 Guangya Lu, (Note: The street address used to be 1 Xiwan Lu. The section of Xiwan Lu where the school is located was renamed Guangya Lu in November 2013 upon the 125th anniversary of the school.) Liwan District; Guangzhou, Guangdong; China
- Coordinates: 23.141°N 113.236°E

Information
- Motto: Traditional Chinese: 務本求實; Simplified Chinese: 务本求实 (Endeavor in the Fundamentals and Pursue the Truth)
- Opened: July 16, 1888
- Founder: Zhang Zhidong
- Website: www.gyzx.edu.cn

Guangdong Guangya High School
- Traditional Chinese: 廣東廣雅中學
- Simplified Chinese: 广东广雅中学
Transcriptions
Standard Mandarin
- Hanyu Pinyin: Guǎngdōng Guǎngyǎ Zhōngxué
Yue: Cantonese
- Jyutping: Gwong^{2} Dung^{1} Gwong^{2} Ngaa^{5} Zung^{1} Hok^{6}

Guangdong Guangya High School (simplified Chinese: 广东广雅中学; traditional Chinese: 廣東廣雅中學) is a reputed senior high school in Guangzhou, Guangdong, People's Republic of China which was founded by Zhang Zhidong, Viceroy of Liangguang on July 16, 1888. (Note: The date was originally recorded as the eighth day of the sixth month of 1888 in the Chinese lunar calendar.) Its earliest predecessor Guangya Academy was one of the Four Academies of China in the late Qing dynasty. The name "Guangya" was chosen by Zhang Zhidong, meaning knowledgeability and integrity.

== Programs and campuses ==
Guangya High School follows the standard Chinese secondary education system and offers a three-year senior program. Students are recruited via municipal high school admission exams. It used to offer a three-year junior program, but the program was moved in 2005 to the privately funded Guangya Experimental School, which itself was established in 2002 and is located in the immediate vicinity. A second "Guangya Experimental"-branded privately funded campus was established in Baiyun District in 2011.

In addition to the campuses in Guangzhou, Guangya High School also operates privately funded campuses in some other cities in Guangdong. An operational campus is located in Yangdong County of Yangjiang and offers both primary and secondary education. A new campus in Boluo County of Huizhou is under construction as of December 2013 and scheduled for opening in September 2014.

== School Name ==
- 21 October 1912 to August 1935: Guangdong Province First Middle School
- August 1935 to October 1938: Guangdong Province "Kwong Nga" High School (廣東省立廣雅中學)
- October 1938 to February 1941: Guangdong Provincial South Road temporary secondary school (廣東省立南路臨時中學)
- February 1941 to 1968: Guangdong Province "Kwong Nga" High School (廣東省立廣雅中學)
- 1968: "Red Flag" High School.
- 1968 to February 1979: "Guangzhou 54th High School"
- February 1979 to now: Guangdong "Guangya" High School.

== History ==
=== Establishment ===
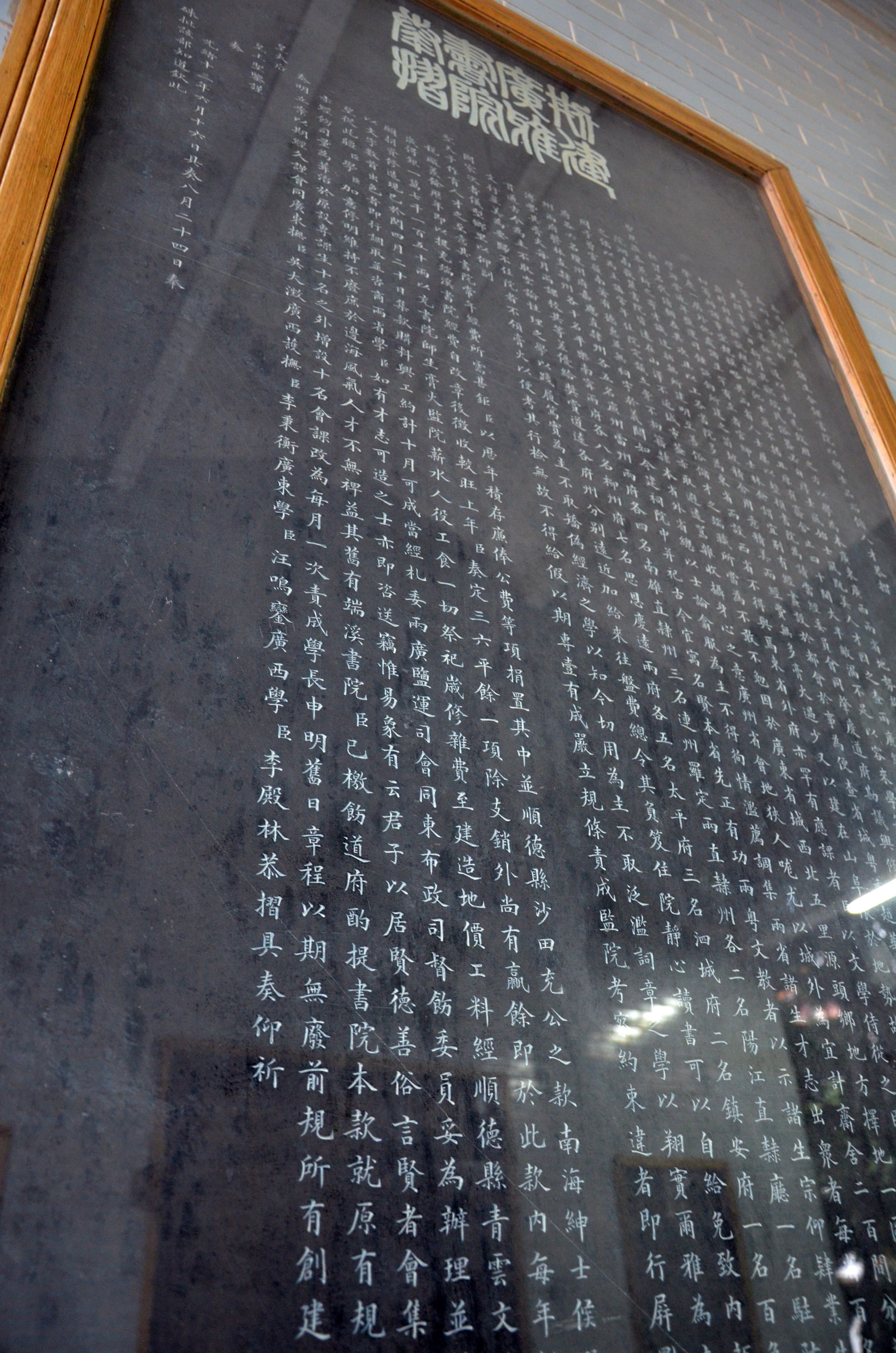
Inscription of Zhang Zhidong's Memorial on the Establishment of Guangya Academy (Chinese: 《創建廣雅書院奏摺》)

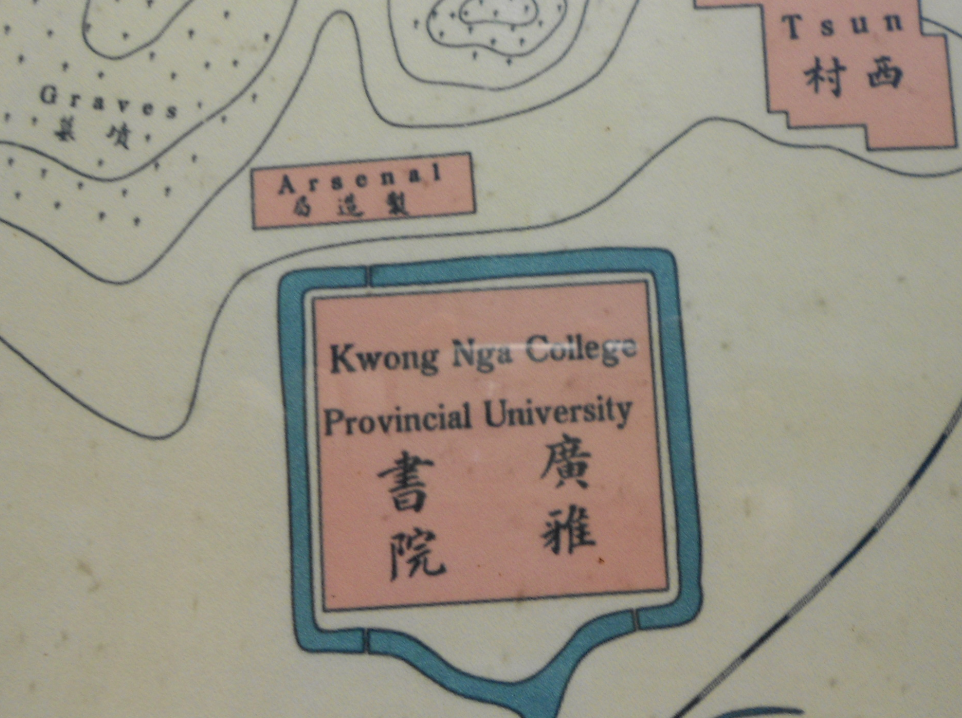
Guangya (廣雅 / 广雅) was known as its Cantonese postal romanization "Kwong Nga" at that time. In this article, "Guangya" instead of "Kwong Nga" was used since the school did not actually have a formal English name then.

In a memorial to the imperial court, Zhang Zhidong stated his motivations for establishing Guangya Academy (廣雅書院 / 广雅书院). He wrote on the necessity of favoring scholarship and creating an educated social atmosphere in Liangguang. He also cited inadequate capacities of several existing academies for taking in students. He was granted permission to purchase 124 mu (8.27 hectares or 20.4 acres) of land in northwest Guangzhou (known as Canton at that time) for the academy. Construction started on June 11, 1887 (Note: The date was originally recorded as the twentieth day of the intercalary fourth month of 1887 in the Chinese lunar calendar.) and completed a year later at a cost of 138,866 taels of silver. The academy opened on July 16, 1888 with an annual budget of 17,150 taels of silver. The inaugural head of the academy was Liang Dingfen, a scholar whom Zhang Zhidong frequently consulted with education issues.

=== Evolution ===
In the over 120 years of its history, Guangya High School evolved with the development of the modern history of China. Until the collapse of Qing Dynasty, Guangya Academy and its successors remained a traditional Chinese academy where Zhang Zhidong's doctrine of "Chinese learning for fundamental principles, Western learning for practical application" (Chinese: 中學為體，西學為用) was practiced. In 1912, under the rule of the newly founded Republic of China, the academy, which had stopped admitting students from Guangxi and become known as Guangdong Advanced Academy, was reorganized as Guangdong Provincial No. 1 High School and was the first high school ever established in Guangdong. The school adopted the western system of three-year junior and senior secondary education in 1922 and opened a senior department in 1924 when the first batch of junior students graduated under the new system. In 1928, educator Liang Shuming was appointed as the principal and proposed the motto "Endeavor in the Fundamentals and Pursue the Truth" (Chinese: 務本求實). The name "Guangya" was restored as the school was renamed Guangdong Provincial Guangya High School in 1935, then dropped in 1939 as the school moved out of Guangzhou after the city fell to the Japanese forces during the Sino-Japanese War, and restored again in 1941.

The current name "Guangdong Guangya High School" was first used in 1949 under the rule of the People's Republic of China. During the Cultural Revolution, the school was renamed Guangdong Red Flag School and later Guangdong Red Flag High School, an evident reflection of the political zealotry of the era. It was redesignated as Guangzhou No. 54 High School in 1969. The last renaming occurred in 1978. The current name was restored and has remained in use since.

== Gallery ==
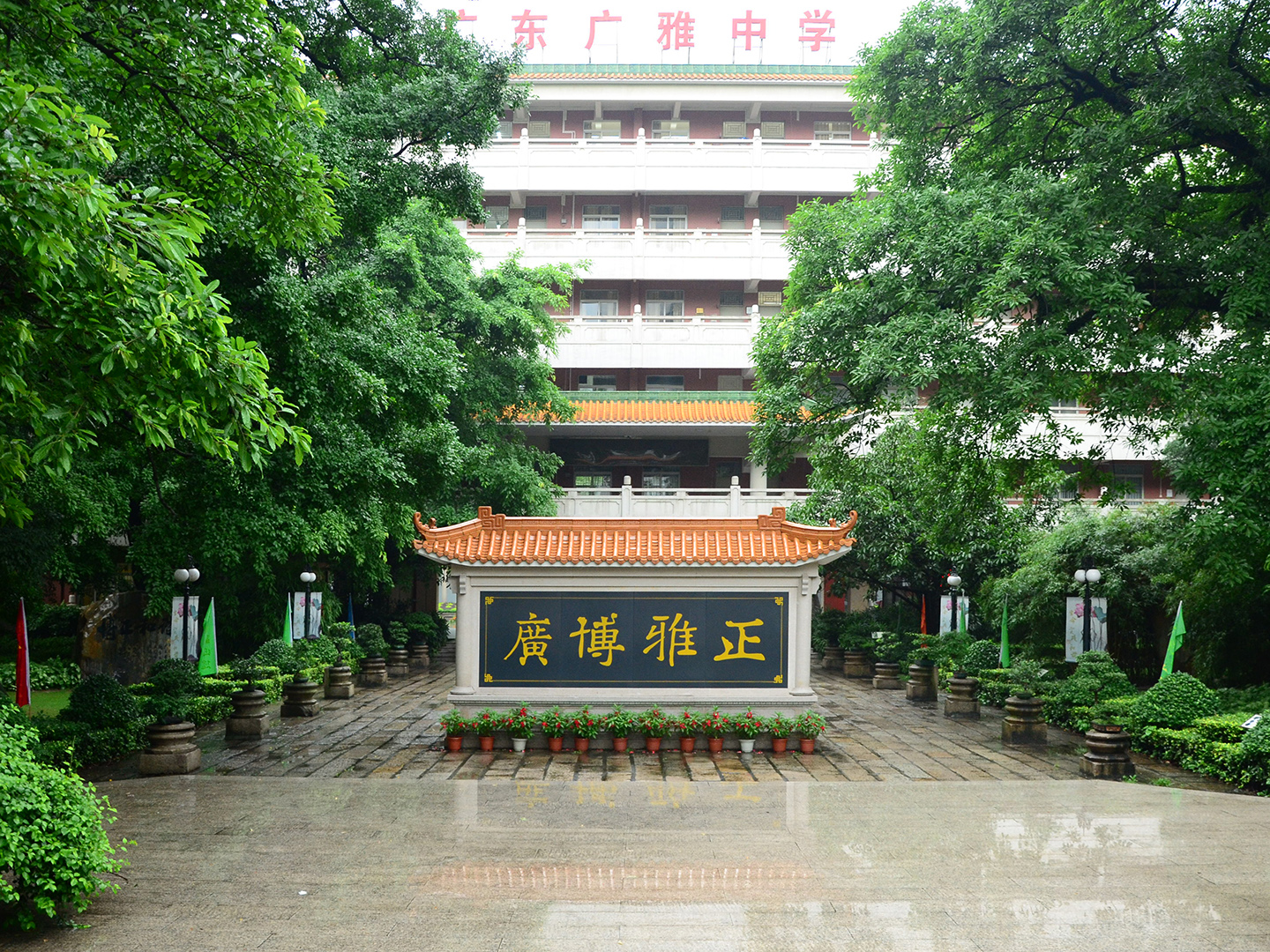
Guangbo Yazheng (the origin of Guangya's name) Monument and Qionghua Building (view from the gate)

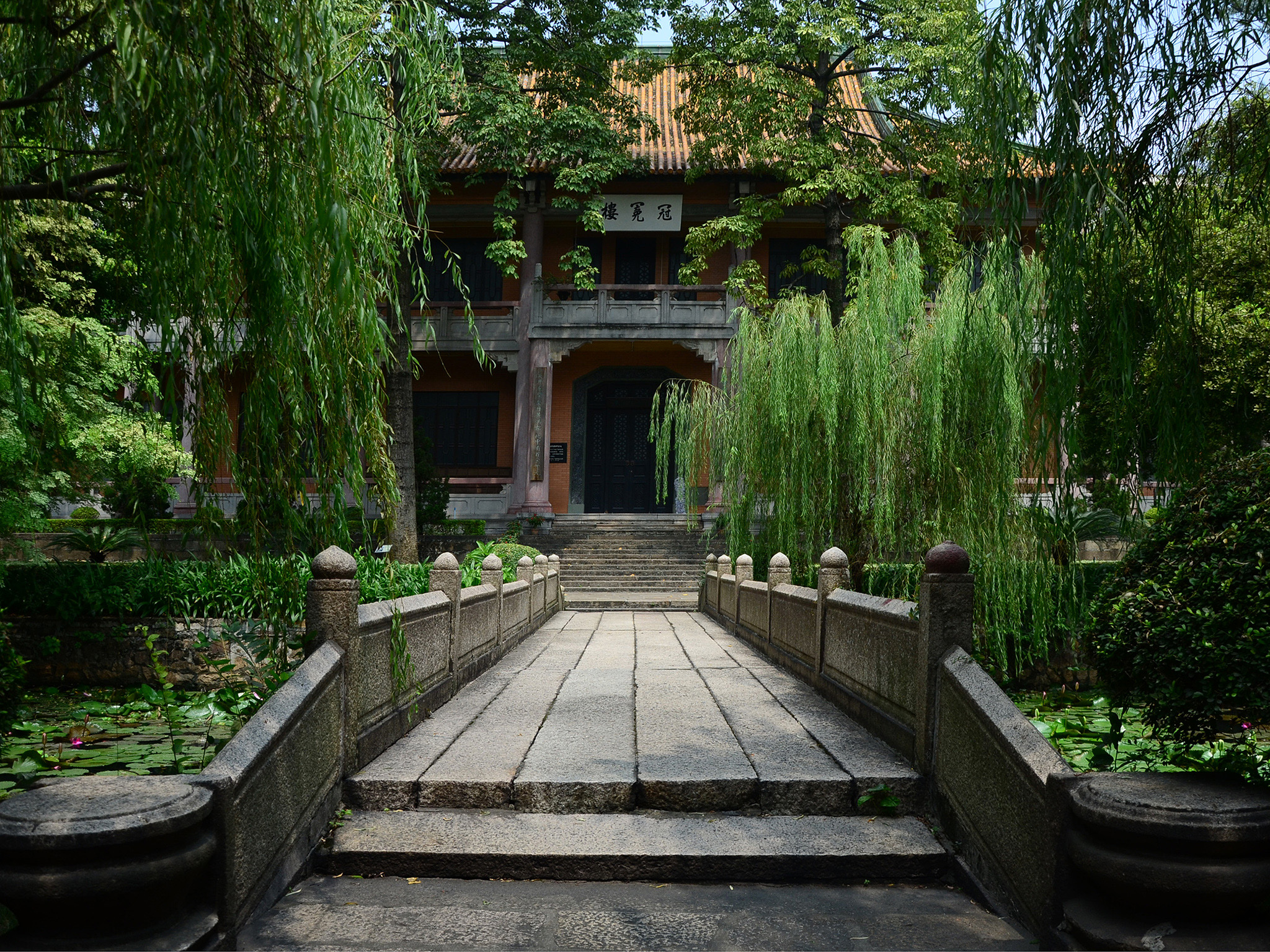
Baisui Bridge (Baisui, literally 100 years) and Guangmian Building

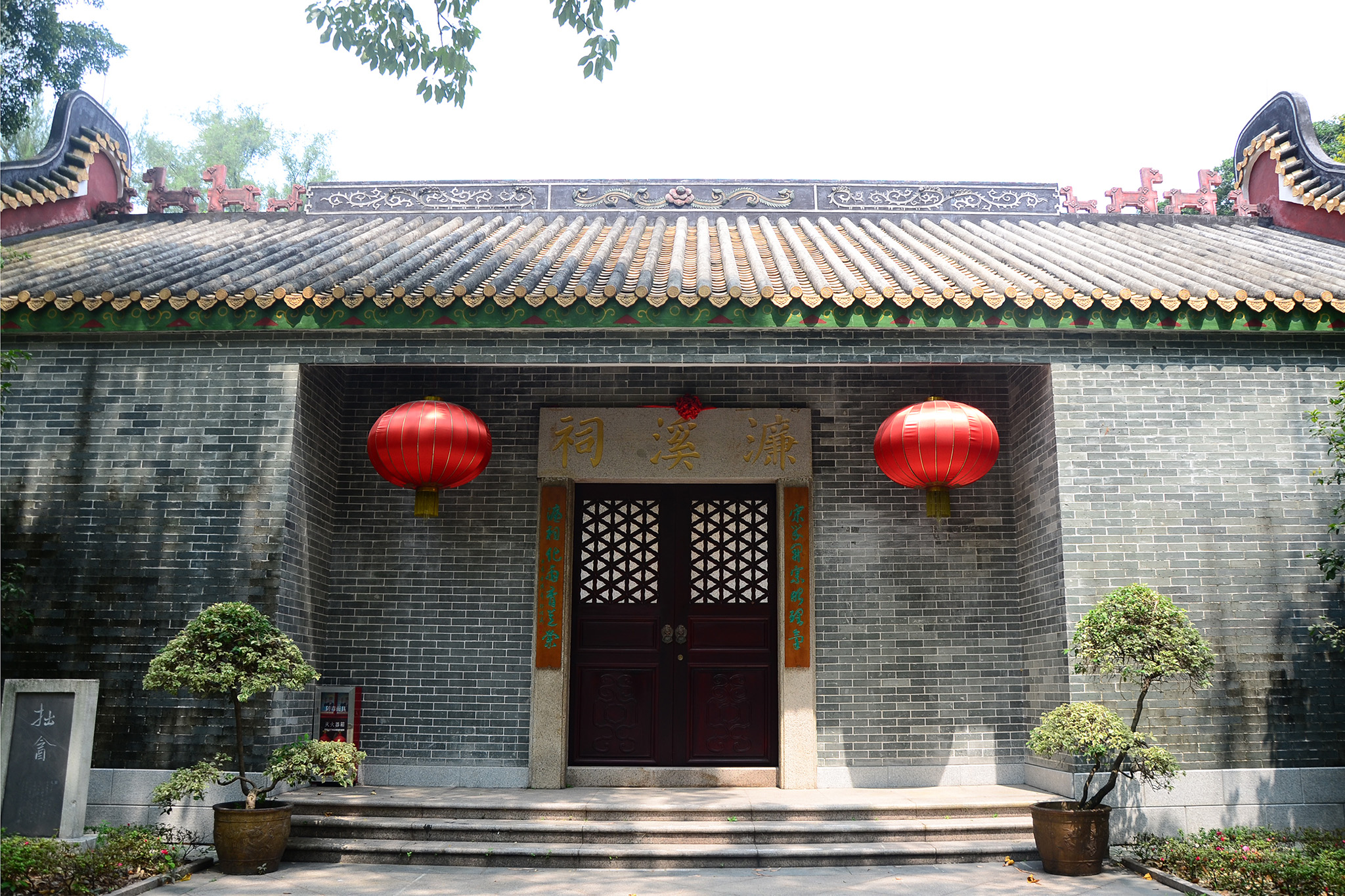
Lianxi Temple

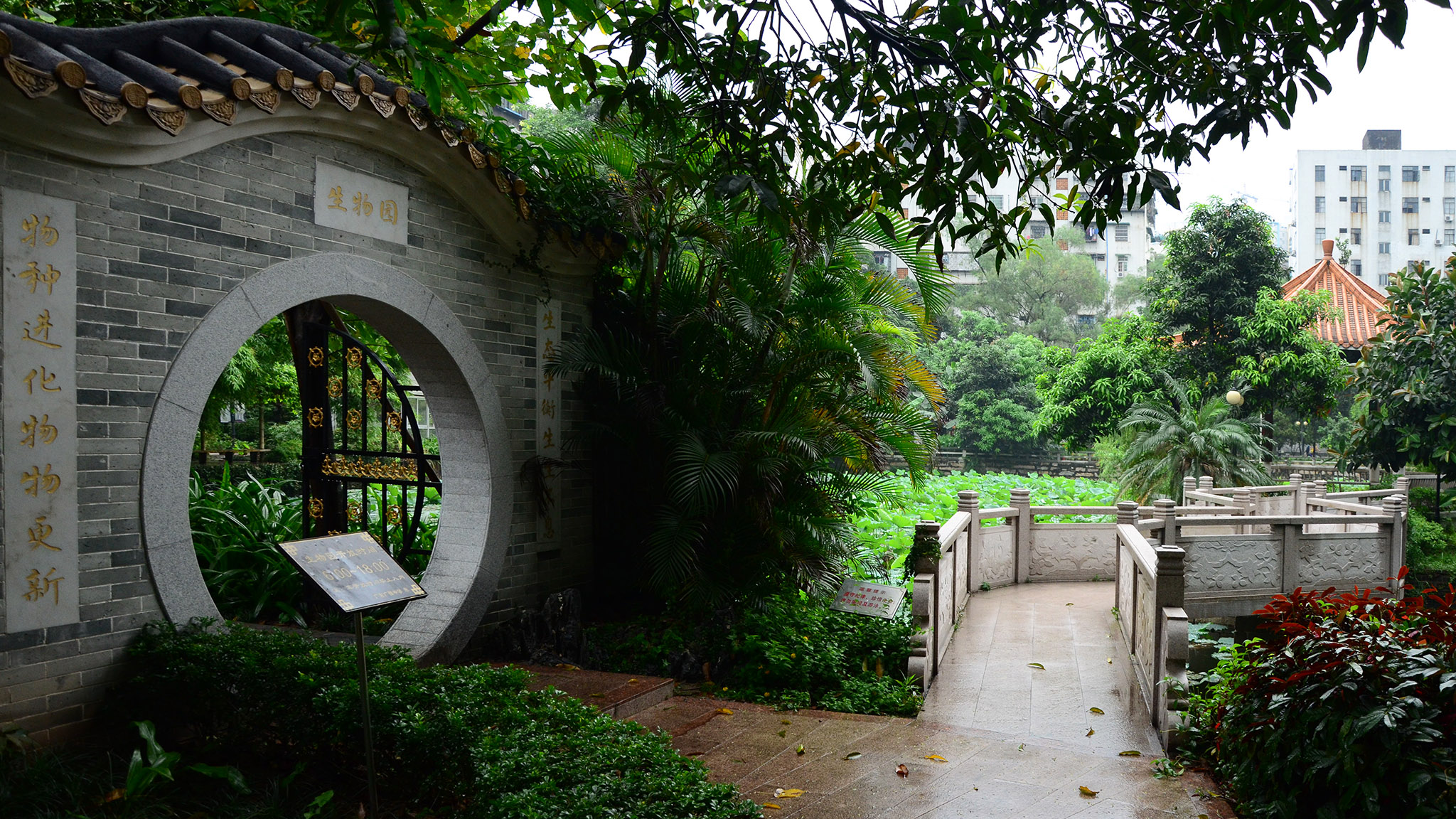
Biology garden and Lotus Pond Pavilion
