= Xu Shilin (character) =

Character in the Legend of the White Snake

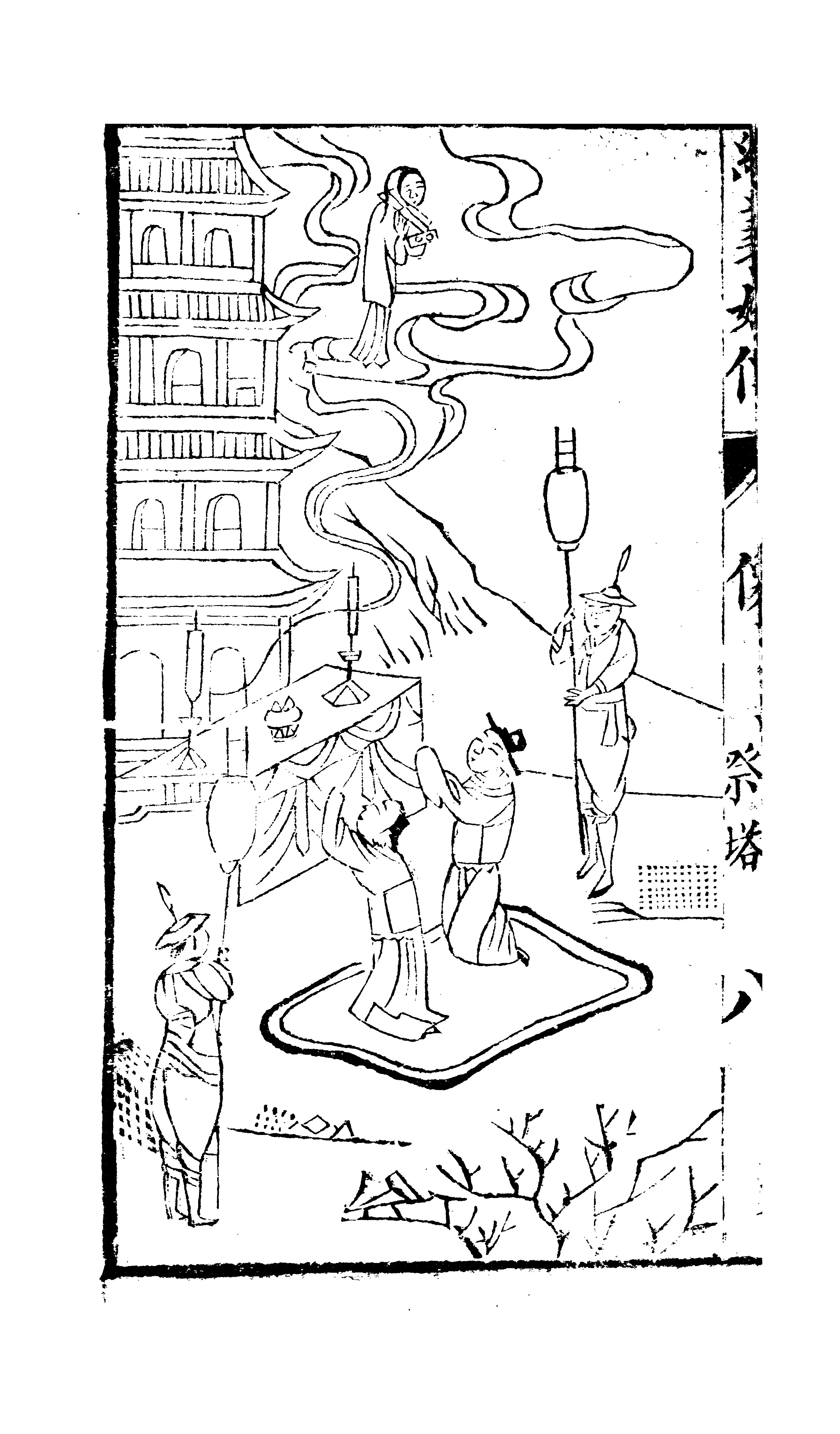
- Xu Shilin pay respects to his mother, rescuing her and ascending to Heaven
- First appearance: Legend of the White Snake

In-universe information
- Occupation: Scholar-official
- Family: Bai Suzhen (mother); Xu Xian (father)
- Spouse: Hu Meiniang
- Home: Qiantang County, Zhejiang

Xu Shilin (Chinese: 許士林), known as Xu Mengjiao (许梦蛟) in some versions, is a Chinese mythological figure, son of the white snake spirit Bai Suzhen and Xu Xian. He is a major character in the Legend of the White Snake, one of four great Chinese folk tales. The story has been adapted many times, including into Chinese operas, films, television series and other media.

The story of Xu Shilin Rescued His Mother is separate from the main legend of the White Snake and has become a well-known folktale in Jiangsu and Zhejiang. His legend is so popular throughout China that there's a common saying: "A child who fulfills the gratitude of their parents is like Xu Shilin, who demonstrated great filial piety to his mother".

== Legends ==
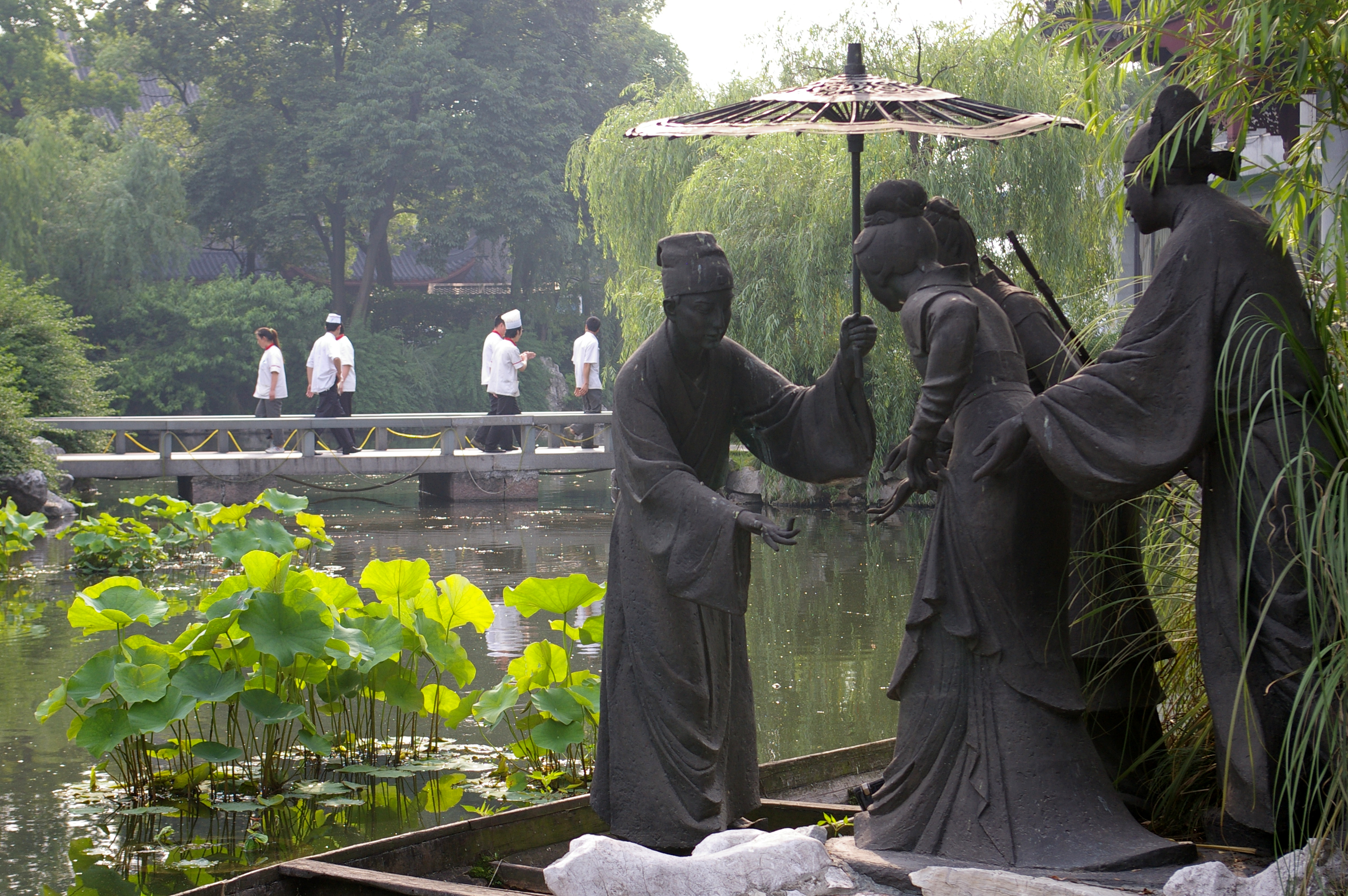
Statues of Xu Xian, Bai Suzhen, Xiaoqing and Xu Shilin at the West Lake in Hangzhou

Legend has it that he is an incarnation of the Wenquxing (Astral God of Civil Arts). Bai Suzhen was defeated and imprisoned in the imposing Leifeng Pagoda by Fahai. While imprisoned, Bai Suzhen gave birth to a son named Shilin. In an alternate version of the story, she named her son Mengjiao. This choice was inspired by a dream in which a dragon encircled her body just before she gave birth. On the same day, Xu Xian's sister-in-law, Lady Li, also welcomed a newborn—a girl she named Bilian. Xu Xian had renounced all worldly attachments, even shaving his hair to fully embrace a life of monkhood, assuming the religious title of 'Daozong' at the Zhaoging Monastery. After three swift years, an unexpected desire to explore the world welled up within him. Fueled by this yearning, he bid farewell to both the fellow monks and his family before setting off from the monastery. After Xian Xian left, Lady Li became Shilin's adoptive mother.

From his earliest years, he displayed remarkable intelligence and a wholehearted dedication to the pursuit of knowledge through books, never growing weary of his studies. Unfortunately, others often ridiculed him, believing him to be the offspring of a snake-spirit. Nonetheless, he harbored no distinction between serpents and other supernatural beings as part of his family. Despite this, he had never laid eyes upon the gentle visage of the mother who had brought him into this world. Whenever he found a moment of respite, he sought solace at the pagoda. Facing north, he would fervently light incense and candles, demonstrating unwavering commitment to his studies, channeling all his effort and strength into the pursuit of knowledge. Twenty years later, he matured into a successful scholar, ultimately achieving the prestigious Zhuangyuan (top scholar) degree in the imperial examination. He petitioned on the Golden Hall, saying, "Your Majesty, my mother is trapped beneath Leifeng Pagoda. I humbly request your gracious permission to return to my hometown, offer tribute at the pagoda, and rescue my mother." The Song Emperor sympathized deeply with White Snake Lady's plight and therefore ordered Xu Shilin, to carry out the royal decree to offer tribute at the pagoda.

He visited the pagoda to pay his respects to his mother and implored for her release from its confines, ultimately rescuing her and facilitating her ascent to Heaven. The guardian deity, Jiedi Shen (揭地神), acting on the decree of the Buddha (alternatively, the Old Man of the South Pole acting on the decree of the Jade Emperor), facilitated the reunion of mother and son. With a yearning for his mother, he knelt in front of the tower with tears streaming down his face. He expressed, "During the day, I miss my mother so much that it breaks my heart, and at night, my longing for her makes my clothes wet with tears". Bai Suzhen then narrated the past, from her initial acquaintance with Xu Xian to the suppression by Fahai, revealing everything to Xu Shilin. Unfortunately, the time for their reunion was brief, and the mother and son bid a tearful farewell. Xu Shilin then returned to the court to report the day's events. He married his cousin, Bilian (known as Hu Meiniang in some versions). After his death, as an incarnation of Wenquxing, he returned to the Heavenly Court. In certain versions of the story, after Bai Suzhen was rescued from the pagoda, and the entire family was joyfully reunited.

According to an alternate version of the legend, upon returning home, he brought with him a patent of nobility that granted permission to demolish Leifeng Pagoda for his mother. However, when he personally dismantled the pagoda, he discovered his mother curled up beneath its foundation. Bai Suzhen then gracefully ascended to Heaven, riding a cloud of compassion.

The most renowned tale of a son rescuing his sinful mother from her subterranean prison is the story of Mulian Rescues His Mother. In this narrative, Mulian successfully emancipates his mother from the torments of Avici Hell through the mystical powers of Buddha. According to the book Sacrifice at the Pagoda, it explicitly describes the pagoda as a tomb and draws a direct comparison between Shilin and Mulian. However, Shilin does not rely on Daoist magic or Buddhist meditation but rather on his own filial piety and academic skills. His mother's liberation occurs after he passes the metropolitan examinations as the top-ranked candidate and offers imperial sacrifices in her honor.

== Folk religion ==
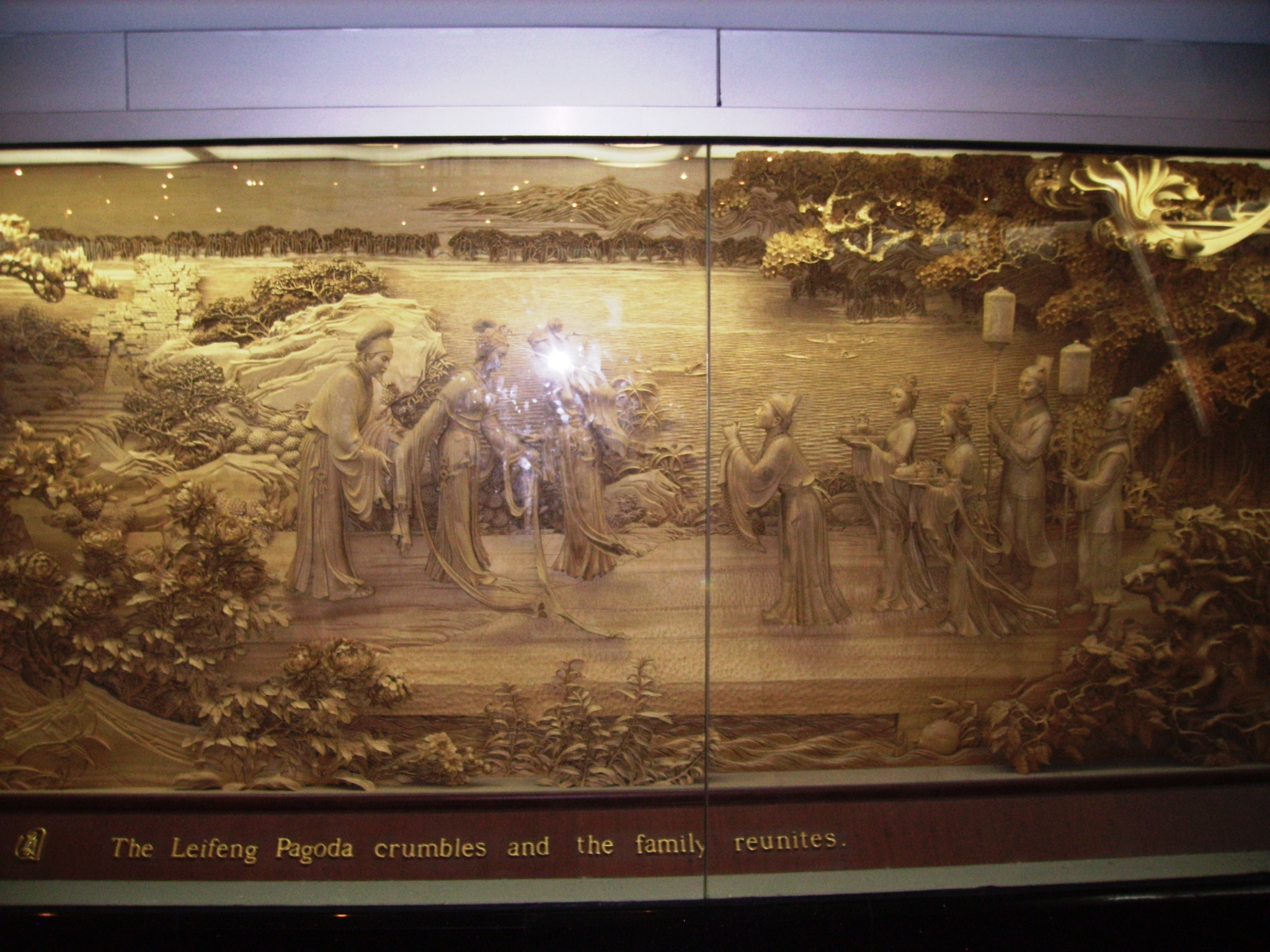
A wood relief decoration in the Leifeng Tower, Hangzhou

The shadow puppetry play Leifeng Pagoda repeatedly emphasizes that White Snake Lady's son, Xu Shilin, is the incarnation of Kuixing (魁星, the God of Literature), widely revered in ancient China as the deity governing literary success. However, in Sichuan, alongside the belief in Kuixing, there is also a strong devotion to another deity associated with literary success, known as Wenchangshen (文昌神), said to have originated from the serpent spirit. The portrayal of White Snake Lady's son as Kuixing while the folk deity worshipped in Sichuan is a serpent spirit is not coincidental. It appears that the author of Leifeng Pagoda integrated external influences while adhering to the local customs of Sichuan, thereby enhancing Xu Shilin's character and strengthening his mythology.

== In popular culture ==
His story is widely portrayed in Chinese operas and other forms of art, especially in Peking opera. Chang Show-foong's essay Xu Shilin's Monologue, selected from the collection of essays After Stepping Down the Red Carpet (步下紅毯之後), is based on the story of Xu Shilin worshipping his mother in The Legend of the White Snake. It intricately expresses Xu Shilin's feelings of worship towards his mother imprisoned in the Leifeng Pagoda, emphasizing the impermanence of the world and portraying the profound emotions between mother and child. The essay won the China Times Prose Recommendation Award in 2018.
